= Borderlands Poles =

Kresowiacy (Polish)

Regions with significant populations
- Poland, Lithuania, Belarus, Ukraine

Languages
- Polish (standard dialect, Northern Borderlands dialect, Southern Borderlands dialect), others

Religion
- Roman Catholicism, Eastern Orthodoxy

Related ethnic groups
- Poles, Bug River Poles

The Borderlands Poles, or Borderlanders (Polish: Kresowiacy), and also known as the Borderlands groups (Polish: grupy kresowe), is an umbrella term for the ethnographic groups of Polish people from the Eastern Borderlands, an area now to the east of Poland, within modern-day Belarus, Lithuania, Ukraine. They are descended from Polonized local inhabitants, i.e. Lithuanians, Belarusians and Ukrainians, and settlers that had Masovian, and to a lesser extend, Lesser Poland, origin. The groups are not directly connected, having different origins, and developing separately. However, they are categorized together, due to the shared factor of devolving on the eastern borderlands of Polish population, influenced by the other ethnic groups located to the east. In the aftermath of World War II, they were displaced from the Soviet Union to Poland, mostly in the first repatriation of 1944–1946, and later in the second repatriation of 1955–1959. As such, they, and their descendants, now live across Poland. Such people are also known as the Bug River Poles (Polish: Zabużanie).

== Groups ==
Several ethnographic groups are categorized as part of the Borderlands groups. However, there is not one agreed upon list. Groups included in the list by various ethnographers include: Bug River Podlachians, Chełm group, Hrubieszow group, Lviv–Ternopil group, Podlachians, Przemyśl group, Dolinianie, Pogorzans, and Vilnius group.

Formerly, some ethnographers, such as Jan Stanisław Bystroń, also included Lublinians and Rzeszovians, however, Janusz Kamocki, basing the research by Jan Natanson-Leski, states that they are the indigenous populations in the area, Lesser Poland.
