= Bug River Poles =

Zabużanie (Polish)

Regions with significant populations
- Poland

Languages
- Polish (standard dialect, Northern Borderlands dialect, Southern Borderlands dialect, new mixed dialects, others)

Religion
- Roman Catholicism, Eastern Orthodoxy

Related ethnic groups
- Other Poles, especially Borderlands Poles, Masovians, and Lesser Poland people

The Bug River Poles (Polish: Zabużanie) are Polish people who, either were, or are descendants of, the inhabitants of the area of the Eastern Borderlands, an area to the east of modern borders of Poland, within the modern territory of Belarus, Lithuania, Ukraine, that were displaced from there to Poland between 1944 and 1959.

== Name ==
The name refers to the Bug River, a major river mostly located in Eastern Europe, which now makes the portion of the Eastern border of Poland with Belarus and Ukraine. In Polish the name is Zabużanie (singular: Zabużanin), which literally means the "people from the other side of Bug", "trans-Bug people". It refers to the fact that people to whom that name applies, used to live to the east of that river.

== History ==
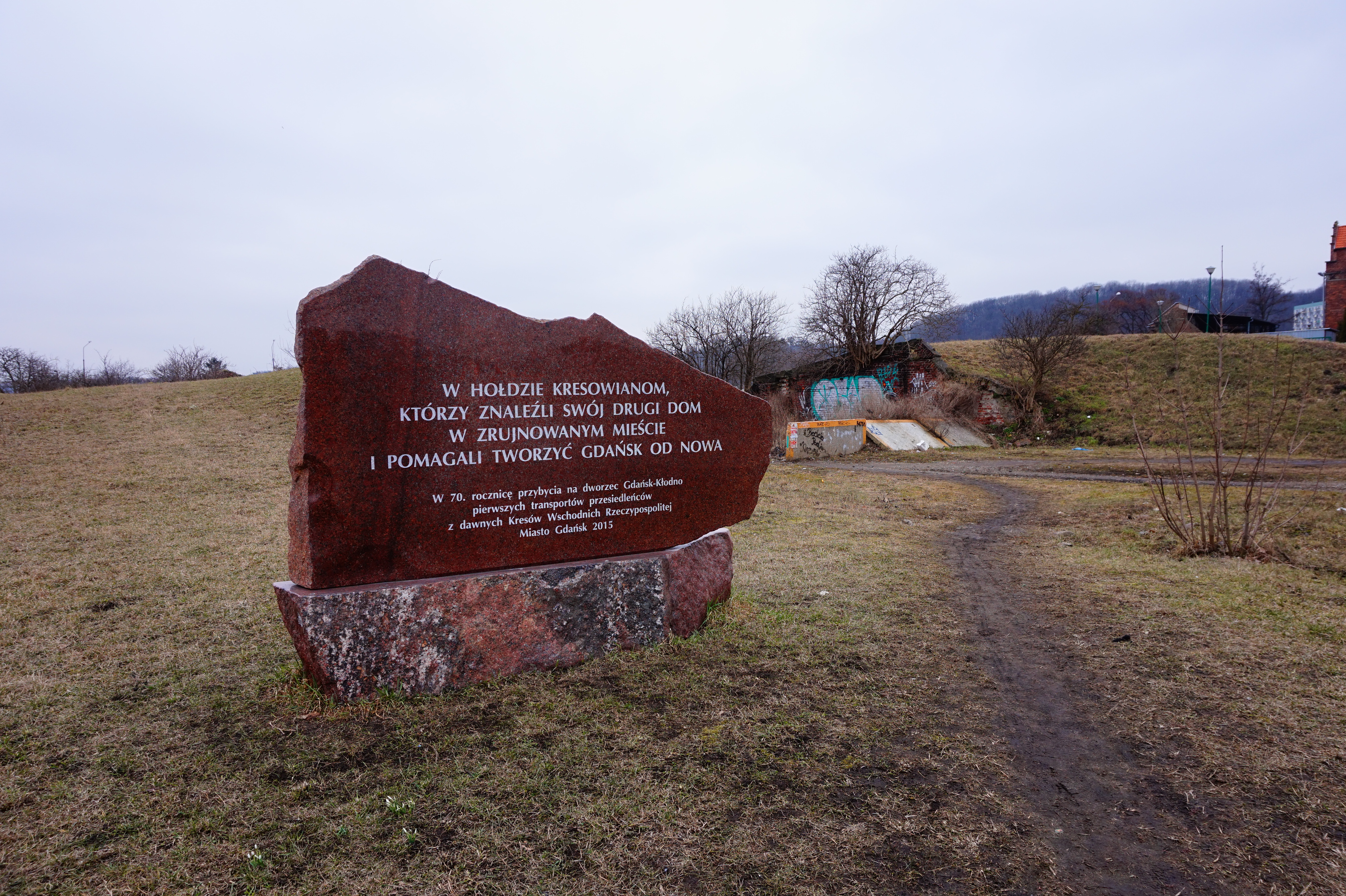
The monument in Gdańsk, commemorating the Bug River Poles who settled in the city following the end of World War II, and helped rebuild it.

The Borderlands Poles are the collection of the ethnographic groups of Polish people from the area of the Eastern Borderlands, an area to the east of modern borders of Poland, within the modern territory of Belarus, Lithuania, Ukraine. They are mostly descendants of Masovians, and to a lesser extent, Lesser Poland people, some of whom colonised the area across centuries.

In the aftermath of World War II, thousands of Polish people were displaced from the Soviet Union to Poland, mostly in the first repatriation of 1944–1946, and later in the second repatriation of 1955–1959. As such, they, and their descendants, now live across Poland.

Many of those who were forced to leave, had to leave their property behind, including land, vehicles, and others. It is referred to as Bug River property, and Poland is currently paying the portion of the recompensation to them, and their descendants. Currently, the term Bug River Poles is popularly used to refer to those who are eligible to receive such recompensation.
