= Kresy dialect =

Kresy dialects of Polish:

- Northern Borderlands dialect
- Southern Borderlands dialect
