= Kresy myth =

Polish irredentist national myth

Map of areas where Polish was used as a primary language in 1916

The Kresy myth (Polish: mit Kresów), also known as the Kresy Cult (kult Kresów) and the Kresy Legend (legenda Kresów), is the name given to modern-day Polish nostalgia for Poland's former eastern borderlands or Kresy. According to Andrii Portnov, though the Kresy myth portrays the Kresy as the location of "bloody and romantic clashes with the Cossacks and Tatars," it also portrays the Kresy as "'the lost paradise' of Poland’s 'civilisational mission'". The Kresy was part of the Polish–Lithuanian Commonwealth and the Second Polish Republic but, since the latter's fall, has been divided among Ukraine, Belarus, and Lithuania. Though the Kresy, in certain definitions, extends beyond the boundaries of interwar Poland, the chief objects of Kresy nostalgia are the Vilnius region and Eastern Galicia, notably Lwów (Lviv). Proponents of the Kresy myth are sometimes accused of focusing on Poles living in the Kresy without paying sufficient attention to the region's Ukrainian, Lithuanian, Rusyn, or Belarusian inhabitants.

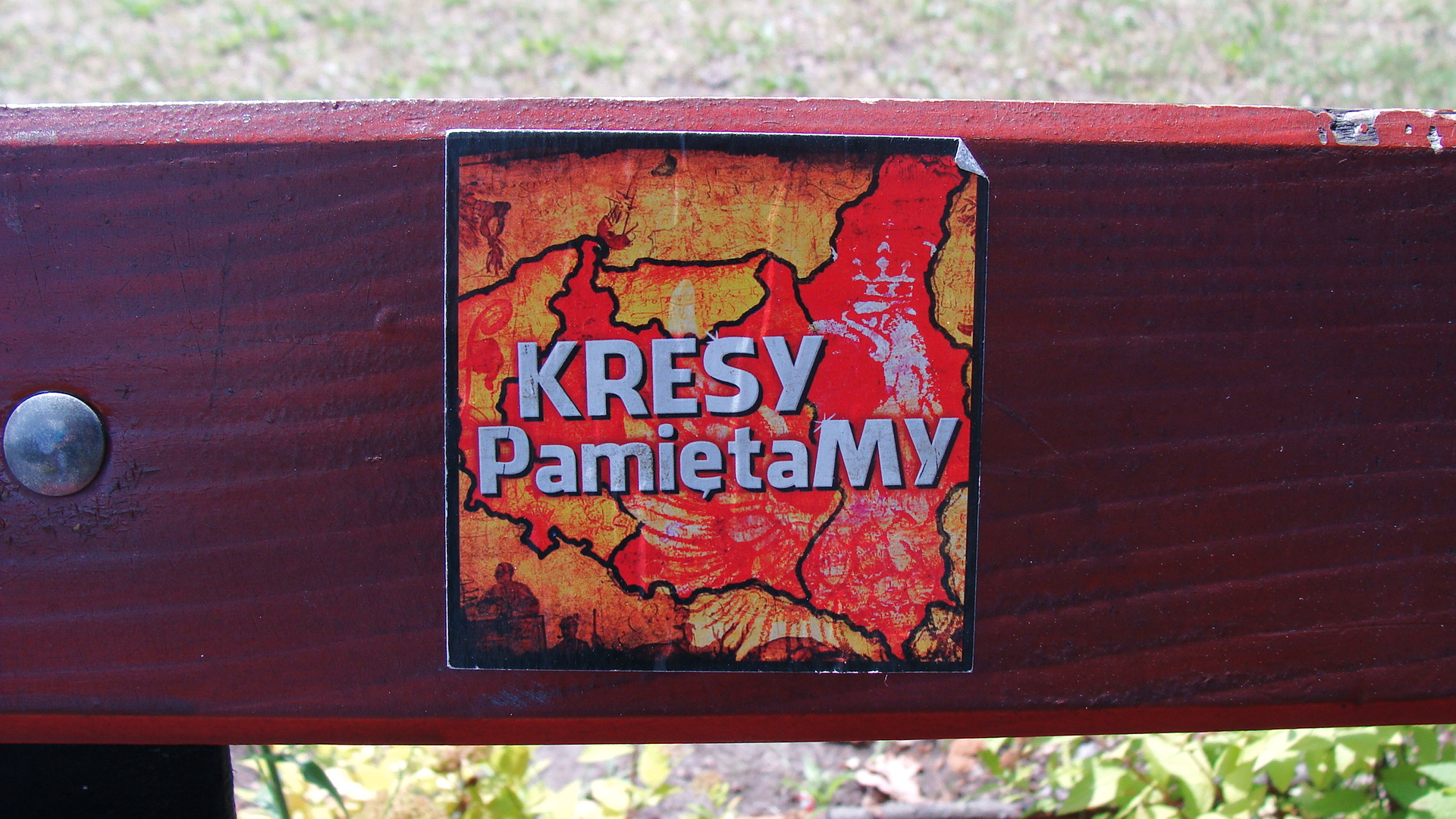
Sticker exemplifying the Kresy myth. Kresy Pamiętamy means "We remember the Kresy".

== Mythology ==
The Kresy myth is an important component of certain versions of the Polish national mythology. According to Bogusław Bakuła it is a highly orientalist postimperial narrative. Historian Daniel Beauvois has called for the abandonment of the Kresy myth, calling it historically false, based on notions of Polish cultural superiority over Belarusian, Lithuanian, and Ukrainian culture. According to Leszek Szaruga,

The myth of the kresy [lower-case sic] is a myth founded in many respects on the sentimental self-delusion of the Poles. The mechanism whereby that self-delusion operated is understandable, but that does not mean it has to be fully accepted.

According to Antony Polonsky, this is a particularly harsh view. Maria Janion compares the Kresy myth to the American frontier myth of the Wild West. Several scholars, including Robert Traba, point out the similarity between the Kresy myth and the German discourse on East Prussia. Kresy is viewed as a "bulwark of Christianity" in the same way that East Prussia was a "bulwark of German-ness". According to Agnieszka Niemojewska, the myth

presents the Polish–Lithuanian Commonwealth not as it really was, but as many would like to remember. A Poland that is strong, respected, safe behind a solid wall of a noble court and armed in a chivalrous ethos. Simply put: Poland that you could love.

The militaristic battles fought in the borderlands against various enemies across the centuries led the Kresy myth to grow out of the Sarmatian one. The military element of the myth was developed in the works of Henryk Sienkiewicz.

According to Niemojewska, one of the main sources of the myth was Adam Mickiewicz's Ballads and Romances, which, contrary to Enlightenment rationalism, views the Kresy through the prism of romanticism and rituals passed down through generations. She writes that various Polish authors, such as Stanisław Lem (Highcastle, 1966) and Tadeusz Konwicki (A Chronicle of Amorous Accidents, 1974), have used elements of this myth in their work. Even Czesław Miłosz, who usually eschewed sentimental myths, in a certain sense arguably used elements of Kresy mythology when writing about Lithuania. However, Bakuła argues that the fullest expression of the myth is not in literature but in academic and historical publications.
