= Lesser Poland people =

Małopolanie (Polish)

Regions with significant populations
- Poland

Languages
- Polish (Lesser Poland dialect)

Religion
- Roman Catholicism

Related ethnic groups
- Poles

The Lesser Poland people (Note: Polish: Małopolanie) is a collection of the ethnographic groups of Polish people, that originate from the region of Lesser Poland. They speak in the Lesser Poland dialect of Polish language.

== Groups ==
The Lesser Poland people are divided into three subgroups. They are: Cracovian group, Sandomierz group, and Gorals.

The Cracovian group include: Cracovians, Vistulans, and Pogorzans. The Sandomierz group include Lasovians, Lublinians, Posaniaks, Rzeszovians, Sandomierz Borowiaks, and Sandomierzans. The Gorals include Babia Góra Gorals, Čadca Gorals, Kliszczaks, Łącko Gorals, Pieniny Gorals, Podhalans, Poprad Gorals, Sącz Gorals, Sącz Lachs, Spišans, Zagórzans, and Żywiec Gorals.
