= Lublinians =

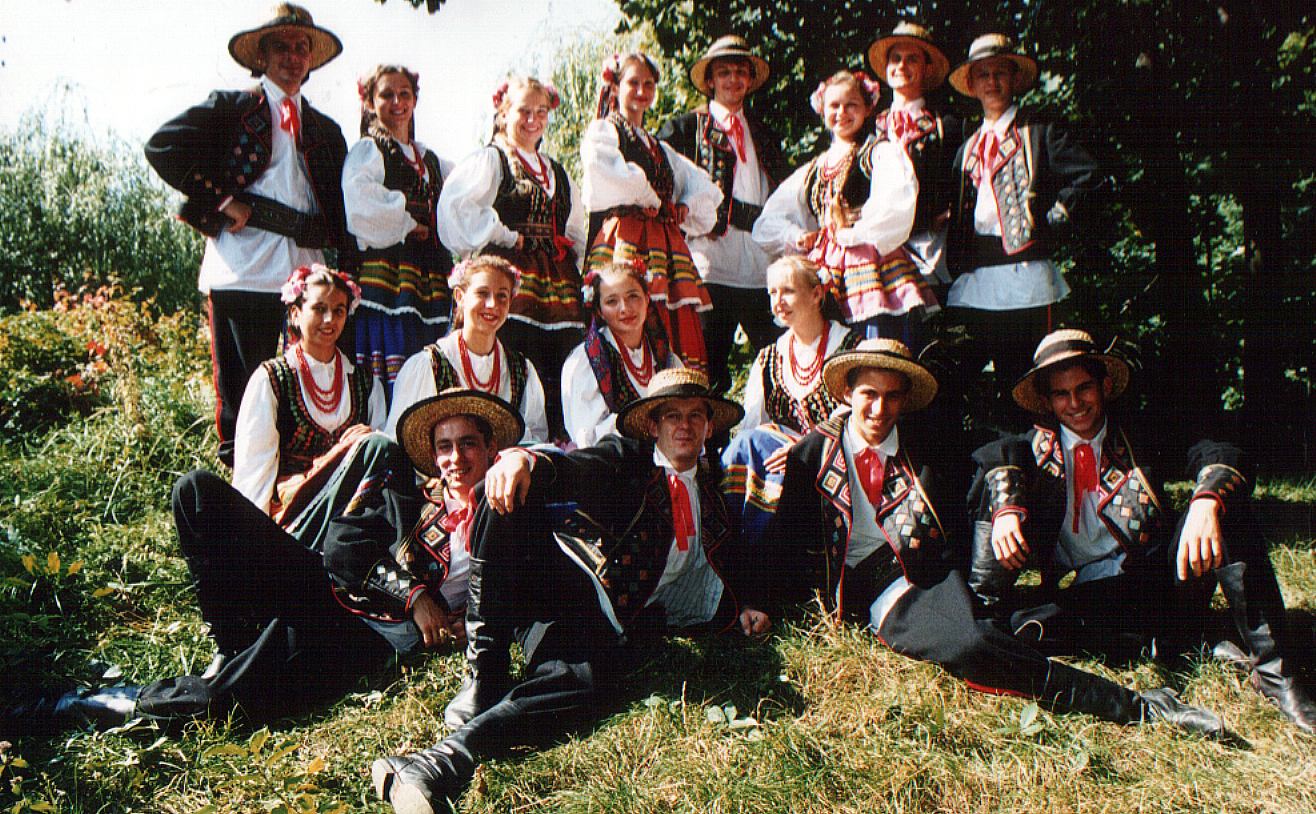
Traditional costume from Lublin

The Lublinians (Polish: Lubliniacy) are a subethnic group of the Polish people, who reside in the historic region of Lesser Poland, in the area of the city of Lublin. They use their own dialect, which belongs to the Lesser Poland dialect of the Polish language. Like most Poles, the Lubliniacy are Roman Catholics.

Polish linguist Jan Stanislaw Bystron claimed that the Lubliniacy should be regarded as a group that belongs to the region of Kresy Wschodnie (Eastern Borderlands), as they resided in areas which had previously been inhabited by Eastern Slavs. Furthermore, the Lubliniacy were under influence of neighboring province of Mazovia. Examples of local architecture and other artefacts are kept at the Museum of Lublin Village in Lublin.

Polish ethnographer Janusz Kamocki divided the Lubliniacy into the following subgroups:

- Powisle Lubelskie, along the Vistula river, which has been under strong influence of the neighboring Mazovia,
- Bilgoraj, which is strongly tied to the Lesser Poland traditions
- Zamosc, residing outside the area of historic Lesser Poland, but belonging to its cultural circle. Peasants of former Zamoyski Family Fee Tail emphasize their difference,
- Central, around Lublin.

== Sources ==
- Encyklopedia Polski. wyd. Wydawnictwo Ryszard Kluszczynski, Kraków 1996.

== See also ==
- Lesser Poland
