= Repatriation of Poles (1955–1959) =

Period of Poles Repatriation

The second wave of forced repatriation (or deportation) of Poles living in the territories annexed by the Soviet Union (known as Kresy Wschodnie) took place in 1955–1959. The widely used term repatriation, promoted by decades of Polish communist propaganda, is a euphemism for acts of expatriation. It is sometimes known as the "second repatriation", to distinguish it from the repatriation in 1944–1946.

== History ==
In the aftermath of the death of Joseph Stalin and the start of destalinization, about 250,000 people were repatriated, including about 25,000 political prisoners from the Gulags. Notable Poles repatriated during that time include Czesław Niemen, Władysław Kozakiewicz, Lew Rywin, and Anna Seniuk.

By the late 1940s, up to one million ethnic Poles remained in the Soviet Union. Deprived of all educated leaders, who had already left for Poland, the Poles found themselves in the middle of several local conflicts, which took place in the Lithuanian SSR and Ukrainian SSR (see Lithuanian partisans, Ukrainian Insurgent Army). In the western part of Byelorussian SSR, which still had a substantial Polish minority, several Polish guerrilla units operated until the early 1950s, especially in the area of Lida. Furthermore, the campaign of collectivization affected Polish villages from a wide belt, ranging from Vilnius to Ukraine’s Ternopil. Those farmers who resisted it were sent to Siberia, and the terror continued until the mid-1950s.

On 15 November 1956, a Polish delegation consisting of Władysław Gomułka and Józef Cyrankiewicz left for Moscow to initiate talks about the so-called repatriation. Due to their efforts, by end of that year some 30,000 Poles were allowed to leave the Soviet Union and settle in the People's Republic of Poland. On 25 March 1957, the ministers of internal affairs of both countries, Wladyslaw Wicha and Nikolay Dudorov, signed an agreement, upon which all individuals who before 17 September 1939 (see Soviet invasion of Poland) were citizens of the Second Polish Republic, together with their spouses and children, were able to move to Poland. In many cases, however, Polish citizenship was difficult to prove, since documents were missing or lost. In such situations, the Polish government had to provide evidence. Furthermore, ethnic Poles were scattered not only in former eastern provinces of Poland, but also all over the Soviet Union. Reaching them was often difficult, and to make matters worse, the process was overseen by the former Stalinist prosecutor, Stefan Kalinowski, who had himself sent Poles to Siberia in the 1940s.

Despite all these obstacles, the number of repatriated Poles steadily grew:

Year	Number of Poles leaving
1955	6,429
1956	30,787
1957	93,872
1958	85,865
1959	32,292

Altogether, in the five-year period, 245,501 Poles left the Soviet Union. The vast majority of them came from former Polish territory, Kresy Wschodnie - from the Lithuanian SSR (46,552), Byelorussian SSR (100,630), and Ukrainian SSR (76,059). Most of them settled in the Recovered Territories, where they found employment at State Agricultural Farms.

After the repatriation, some 360,000 Poles still remained in Soviet Ukraine. Most of them resided in the area of Zhytomyr and Berdychiv, but also in the city of Lviv, where in 1959 the Polish population was about 17,000. In Soviet Belarus, some 540,000 Poles remained, and in Lithuania, 230,000.

== See also ==
- Bug River property
- Poles in the Soviet Union
- Soviet repressions of Polish citizens (1939–1946)
- Sybirak
