= Bug River property =

Bug River property lies to the east of the Curzon Line-based part of the modern Polish border

A Bug River property (Polish: Mienie zabużańskie, lit. property beyond the Bug River) is a property which was within the territory of interbellum Poland (Second Polish Republic) and was forcibly vacated by the evicted Polish landowners (Bug River Poles) after 1945 when the territory ceased to be inside Poland. The name refers to the Bug River because the Bug forms a major part of the new eastern boundary of Poland largely based on the Curzon Line, separating the so-called Eastern Borderlands from the rest of the current Polish territory. The Bug River land is today distributed between the states of Belarus, Lithuania, and Ukraine. The claims for compensation for this sequestered land are known as the Bug River claims (Polish: sprawy zabużańskie).

Agreements made between the USSR and the interim Polish government, the Government of National Unity mostly concerned the evacuation of the population and did not set out any detailed rules for compensating owners of vacated property. The laws of Communist Poland had a limited number of provisions concerning issues related to ownership of agricultural land and estates.

In modern Poland, a legislative provision was made on December 12, 2003, to form the basis of state compensation for Polish citizens against the value of their vacated property abroad, by offsetting the value of that vacated property, against an assessed sale price or rent arising from perpetual use. As of February 29, 2003, 82,000 applications for compensation were submitted, with a total estimated value of over 10,500 million PLN.

Due to the unsatisfactory handling of the matter it was raised before the Polish Constitutional Court in 2002.

In 2004 the matter came before the European Court for Human Rights in the test case: Broniowski v. Poland.) The Court found

A systemic problem connected with the malfunctioning of domestic legislation and practice caused by the failure to set up an effective mechanism to implement the "right to credit" of Bug River claimants ... with the consequence that not only the applicant in this particular case but also a whole class of individuals had been or were still denied the peaceful enjoyment of their possessions.

The Court noted that the matter was not satisfactorily resolved for some 80,000 claimants.

Further decrees on the implementation of the right to compensation include:

- Decree of July 8, 2005 - "O realizacji prawa do rekompensaty z tytułu pozostawienia nieruchomości poza obecnymi granicami Rzeczypospolitej Polskiej" (Dz. U. z 2005r. Nr 169 poz. 1418).
- Decree of September 8, 2006 - "O zmianie ustawy o realizacji prawa do rekompensaty z tytułu pozostawienia nieruchomości poza obecnymi granicami Rzeczypospolitej Polskiej oraz niektórych innych ustaw" (Dz. U. 2006r.Nr 195 poz. 1437).

In February 2014 President Bronisław Komorowski signed a decree to update further the regulations relating to compensation for Bug River landowners. In particular, the decree removed a number of restrictions on the right to compensation. In so doing, it addressed the issues raised before the Constitutional Court and the ECHR on the subject.

Due to the aspiration of Ukraine to join the European Union, a discussion has arisen in Poland about whether Ukraine would be willing to share the burden of compensation. In August 2007 the Supreme Court of Poland issued a judgement that Bug River claims regarding Ukraine cannot be resolved in Polish civil courts and belong to Ukrainian courts, due to international agreements between Ukraine and Poland. Therefore these claims must be resolved by administrative means.

Reportedly, Lithuania has only reluctantly addressed the claims of Poles for compensation/restitution.

== See also ==
- Lastenausgleich, a (West) German compensation programme for World War II damages to its citizens, esp. for those who lost their real estate due to the border changes.
