= Polish population transfers in 1944–1946 =

Post WWII resettlement

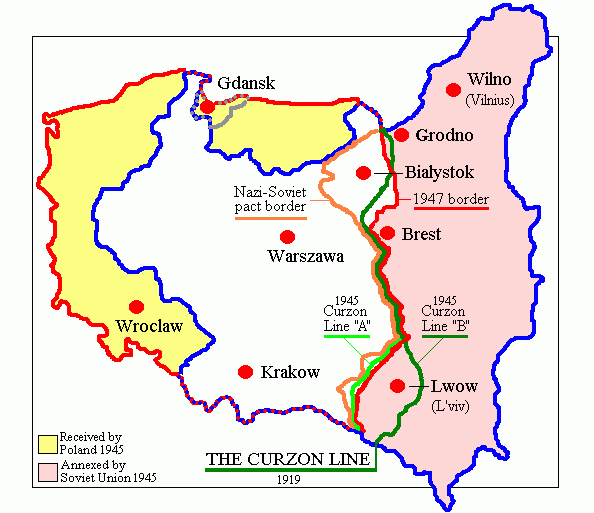
The Curzon Line and territorial changes of Poland, 1939 to 1945. The pink and yellow areas represent the pre-war Polish territory (Kresy) and pre-war German territory (Recovered Territories), respectively.

The Polish population transfers in 1944–1946 from the eastern half of prewar Poland (also known as the expulsions of Poles from the Kresy macroregion), were the forced migrations of Poles toward the end and in the aftermath of World War II. These were the result of a Soviet Union policy that had been ratified by the main Allies of World War II. Similarly, the Soviet Union had enforced policies between 1939 and 1941 which targeted and expelled ethnic Poles residing in the Soviet zone of occupation following the Nazi-Soviet invasion of Poland. The second wave of expulsions resulted from the retaking of Poland from the Wehrmacht by the Red Army. The USSR took over territory for its western republics.

The postwar population transfers were part of an official Soviet policy that affected more than one million Polish citizens, who were removed in stages from the Polish areas annexed by the Soviet Union. After the war, following Soviet demands laid out during the Tehran Conference of 1943, Kresy was formally incorporated into the Ukrainian, Belarusian and Lithuanian republics of the Soviet Union. This was agreed at the Potsdam Conference of Allies in 1945, to which the Polish government-in-exile was not invited.

The ethnic displacement of Poles (and also of ethnic Germans) was agreed between the Allied leaders Winston Churchill of the United Kingdom, Franklin D. Roosevelt of the U.S., and Joseph Stalin of the USSR, during the conferences at Tehran and Yalta. The Polish transfers were among the largest of several post-war expulsions in Central and Eastern Europe, which displaced a total of about 20 million people.

According to official data, during the state-controlled expulsion between 1945 and 1946, roughly 1,167,000 Poles left the westernmost republics of the Soviet Union, less than 50% of those who registered for population transfer. Another major ethnic Polish transfer took place after Stalin's death, in 1955–1959.

The process is variously known as expulsion, deportation, depatriation, or repatriation, depending on the context and the source. The term repatriation, used officially in both the Polish People's Republic and the USSR, was a deliberate distortion, as deported peoples were leaving their homeland rather than returning to it. It is also sometimes referred to as the 'first repatriation' action, in contrast with the 'second repatriation' of 1955–1959. In a wider context, it is sometimes described as a culmination of a process of de-Polonization of these areas during and after the world war. The process was planned and carried out by the communist regimes of the USSR and of post-war Poland. Many of the deported Poles were settled in historical eastern Germany; after 1945, these were referred to as the "Recovered Territories" of the Polish People's Republic.

== Background ==
The history of ethnic Polish settlement in what is now Ukraine and Belarus dates to 1030–31. More Poles migrated to this area after the Union of Lublin in 1569, when most of the territory became part of the newly established Polish–Lithuanian Commonwealth. From 1657 to 1793, some 80 Roman Catholic churches and monasteries were built in Volhynia alone. The expansion of Catholicism in Lemkivshchyna, Chełm Land, Podlaskie, Brześć land, Galicia, Volhynia and Right bank Ukraine was accompanied by the process of gradual Polonization of the eastern lands. Social and ethnic conflicts arose regarding the differences in religious practices between the Roman Catholic and the Eastern Orthodox adherents during the Union of Brest in 1595-96, when the Metropolitan of Kyiv-Halych broke relations with the Eastern Orthodox Church and accepted the authority of the Roman Catholic Pope and Vatican.

The partitions of Poland, toward the end of the 18th century, resulted in the expulsions of ethnic Poles from their homes in the east for the first time in the history of the nation. Some 80,000 Poles were escorted to Siberia by the Russian imperial army in 1864 in the single largest deportation action undertaken within the Russian Partition. "Books were burned; churches destroyed; priests murdered;" wrote Norman Davies. Meanwhile, Ukrainians were officially considered "part of the Russian people".

The Russian Revolution of 1917 and the Russian Civil War of 1917-1922 brought an end to the Russian Empire. According to Ukrainian sources from the Cold War period, during the Bolshevik revolution of 1917 the Polish population of Kyiv was 42,800. In July 1917, when relations between the Ukrainian People's Republic (UNR) and Russia became strained, the Polish Democratic Council of Kyiv supported the Ukrainian side in its conflict with Petrograd. Throughout the existence of UNR (1917–21), there was a separate ministry for Polish affairs, headed by Mieczysław Mickiewicz; it was set up by the Ukrainian side in November 1917. In that entire period, some 1,300 Polish-language schools were operating in Galicia, with 1,800 teachers and 84,000 students. In the region of Podolia in 1917, there were 290 Polish schools.

Beginning in 1920, the Bolshevik and nationalist terror campaigns of the new war triggered the flight of Poles and Jews from Soviet Russia to newly sovereign Poland. In 1922 Bolshevik Russian Red Army, with their Bolshevik allies in Ukraine overwhelmed the government of the Ukrainian People's Republic, including the annexed Ukrainian territories into the Soviet Union. In that year, 120,000 Poles stranded in the east were expelled to the west and the Second Polish Republic. The Soviet census of 1926 recorded ethnic Poles as being of Russian or Ukrainian ethnicity, reducing their apparent numbers in Ukraine.

In the autumn of 1935, Stalin ordered a new wave of mass deportations of Poles from the western republics of the Soviet Union. This was also the time of his purges of different classes of people, many of whom were killed. Poles were expelled from the border regions to resettle the area with ethnic Russians and Ukrainians, but Stalin had them deported to the far reaches of Siberia and Central Asia. In 1935 alone 1,500 families were deported to Siberia from Soviet Ukraine. In 1936, 5,000 Polish families were deported to Kazakhstan. The deportations were accompanied by the gradual elimination of Polish cultural institutions. Polish-language newspapers were closed, as were Polish-language classes throughout Ukraine.

Soon after the wave of deportations, the Soviet NKVD orchestrated the Polish Operation. The Polish population in the USSR had officially dropped by 165,000 in that period according to the official Soviet census of 1937–38; Polish population in the Ukrainian SSR decreased by about 30%.

== Second Polish Republic ==
Amidst several border conflicts, Poland re-emerged as a sovereign state in 1918 following Partitions of Poland. The Polish-Ukrainian alliance was unsuccessful, and the Polish-Soviet war continued until the Treaty of Riga was signed in 1921. The Soviet Union did not officially exist before 31 December 1922. The disputed territories were split in Riga between the Second Polish Republic and the Soviet Union representing Ukrainian SSR (part of the Soviet Union after 1923). In the following few years in Kresy, the lands assigned to sovereign Poland, some 8,265 Polish farmers were resettled with help from the government. The overall number of settlers in the east was negligible as compared to the region's long-term residents. For instance in the Volhynian Voivodeship (1,437,569 inhabitants in 1921), the number of settlers did not exceed 15,000 people (3,128 refugees from Bolshevist Russia, roughly 7,000 members of local administration, and 2,600 military settlers). Approximately 4 percent of the newly arrived settlers lived on land granted to them. The majority either rented their land to local farmers, or moved to the cities.

Tensions between the Ukrainian minority in Poland and the Polish government escalated. On 12 July 1930, activists of the Organization of Ukrainian Nationalists (OUN), helped by the UVO, began the so-called sabotage action, during which Polish estates were burned, and roads, rail lines and telephone connections were destroyed. The OUN used terrorism and sabotage in order to force the Polish government into actions that would cause a loss of support for the more moderate Ukrainian politicians ready to negotiate with the Polish state. OUN directed its violence not only against the Poles but also against Jews and other Ukrainians who wished for a peaceful resolution to the Polish–Ukrainian conflict.

== Invasion of Poland ==
The 1939 Soviet invasion of Poland during World War II was subsequently accompanied by the Soviets forcibly deporting hundreds of thousands of Polish citizens to distant parts of the Soviet Union: Siberia and Central Asia. Five years later, for the first time, the Supreme Soviet formally acknowledged that the Polish nationals expelled after the Soviet invasion were not Soviet citizens, but foreign subjects. Two decrees were signed on 22 June and 16 August 1944 to facilitate the release of Polish nationals from captivity.

=== Deportations ===
After the secret Molotov–Ribbentrop pact in 1939 between Nazi Germany and the Soviet Union, Germany invaded Western Poland. Two weeks later, the Soviet Union invaded eastern Poland. As a result, Poland was divided between the Germans and the Soviets (see Polish areas annexed by the Soviet Union). With the annexation of the Kresy in 1939, modern-day Western Ukraine was annexed to Soviet Ukraine, and Western Belarus to Soviet Belorussia, respectively. Spreading terror throughout the region, the Soviet secret police (NKVD) accompanying the Red Army murdered Polish prisoners of war. From 1939 to 1941 the Soviets also forcibly deported specific social groups deemed "untrustworthy" to forced labor facilities in Kazakhstan and Siberia. Many children, elderly and sick died during these journeys, in cargo trains, which lasted weeks. Whereas the Polish government-in-exile put the number of deported Polish citizens at 1,500,000 and some Polish estimates reach 1,600,000 to 1,800,000 persons, historians consider these evaluations as exaggerated. Alexander Guryanov calculated that 309,000 up to 312,000 Poles were deported from February 1940 to June 1941. According to N.S. Lebedeva the deportations involved about 250,000 persons. The most conservative Polish counts based on Soviet documents and published by the Main Commission to Investigate Crimes Against the Polish Nation in 1997 amounted to a grand total of 320,000 persons deported. Sociologist Tadeusz Piotrowski argues that various other smaller deportations, prisoners of war and political prisoners should be added for a grand total of 400,000 to 500,000 deported.

By 1944, the population of ethnic Poles in Western Ukraine was 1,182,100. The Polish government in exile in London affirmed its position of retaining the 1939 borders. Nikita Khrushchev, however, approached Stalin personally to keep the territories gained through the illegal and secret Molotov–Ribbentrop pact under continued Soviet occupation.

The residents of the Western Ukraine and Byelorussia, as well as those of the Wilno district, which had been annexed to the Soviet Union under the Ribentrop-Molotov pact of 23 August and 28 September 1939, had all been under German occupation for between two and half to three years, and were finally annexed to the Soviet Union in 1944. The speedy exodus of Poles from these regions was meant to erase their Polish past and to confirm the fact that the regions were indeed part of the Soviet Union.

The document regarding the resettlement of Poles from the Ukrainian and Belorussian SSRs to Poland was signed 9 September 1944 in Lublin by Khrushchev and the head of the Polish Committee of National Liberation Edward Osóbka-Morawski (the corresponding document with the Lithuanian SSR was signed on 22 September). The document specified who was eligible for the resettlement (it primarily applied to all Poles and Jews who were citizens of the Second Polish Republic before 17 September 1939, and their families), what property they could take with them, and what aid they would receive from the corresponding governments. The resettlement was divided into two phases: first, the eligible citizens were registered as wishing to be resettled; second, their request was to be reviewed and approved by the corresponding governments. About 750,000 Poles and Jews from the western regions of Ukraine were deported, as well as about 200,000 each from western Belarus and from Lithuanian SSR each. The deportations continued until 1 August 1946.

=== Postwar transfers from Ukraine ===
Toward the end of World War II, tensions between the Polish AK and Ukrainians escalated into the Massacres of Poles in Volhynia, led by the nationalist Ukrainian groups including the Organization of Ukrainian Nationalists (OUN) and the Ukrainian Insurgent Army. Although the Soviet government was trying to eradicate these organizations, it did little to support the Polish minority; and instead encouraged population transfer. The haste at which repatriation was done was such that the Polish leader Bolesław Bierut was forced to intercede and approach Stalin to slow down the deportation, as the post-war Polish government was overwhelmed by the sudden great number of refugees needing aid.

The Soviet "population exchanges" of 1944-1946 ostensibly concerned [in the legal sense, nominal] citizens of prewar Poland, but in fact Poles and Jews were sent west, whereas Ukrainians had to stay in Soviet Ukraine. The real criterion was one of ethnicity, not citizenship. The [exclusively] ethnic criterion was applied to everyone in Volhynia, Ukrainians forced to stay despite their prewar Polish citizenship, Poles and Jews forced to leave despite their ancient traditions in the region. Jewish survivors of the Holocaust and Polish survivors of the ethnic cleansing were generally willing to depart. The history of Volhynia, as an ancient multi-confessional society, had come to an end.

— Timothy Snyder

The Poles in southern Kresy (now Western Ukraine) were given the option of resettlement in Siberia or Poland, and most chose Poland.

The Polish government-in-exile in London directed their organizations (see Polish Secret State) in Lwów and other major centers in Eastern Poland to sit fast and not evacuate, promising that during peaceful discussions they would be able to keep Lwów within Poland. In response, Khrushchev introduced a different approach to dealing with this Polish problem. Until this time, Polish children could be educated in Polish, according to the curriculum of pre-war Poland. Overnight this allowance was discontinued, and all Polish schools were required to teach the Soviet Ukrainian curriculum, with classes to be held only in Ukrainian and Russian. All males were told to prepare for mobilization into labor brigades within the Red Army. These actions were introduced specifically to encourage Polish emigration from Ukraine to Poland.

In January 1945, the NKVD arrested 772 Poles in Lviv (where, according to Soviet sources, on 1 October 1944, Poles represented 66.75% of population), among them 14 professors, 6 doctors, 2 engineers, 3 artists, and 5 Catholic priests. The Polish community was outraged about the arrests. The Polish underground press in Lviv characterized these acts as attempts to hasten the deportation of Poles from their city. Those arrested were released after they signed papers agreeing to emigrate to Poland. It is difficult to establish the exact number of Poles expelled from Lviv, but it was estimated as between 100,000 and 140,000.

=== Transfers from Belarus ===
In contrast to actions in the Ukrainian SSR, the communist officials in the Byelorussian SSR did not actively support deportation of Poles. Belarusian officials made it difficult for Polish activists to communicate with tuteishians – people who were undecided as to whether they considered themselves Polish or Belarusian.Much of the rural population, who usually had no official identity documents, were denied the "right" of repatriation on the basis that they did not have documents stating they were Polish citizens. In what was described as a "fight for the people", Polish officials attempted to get as many people repatriated as possible, whereas the Belarusian officials tried to retain them, particularly the peasants, while deporting most of the Polish intelligentsia. It is estimated that about 150,000 to 250,000 people were deported from Belarus. Similar numbers were registered as Poles but forced by the Belarusian officials to remain in Belarus or were outright denied registration as Poles.

In response, Poland followed a similar process in regards to the Belarusian population of the territory of the Białystok Voivodeship, which was partially retained by Poland after World War II. It sought to retain some of the Belarusian people.

=== From Lithuania ===
The resettlement of ethnic Poles from Lithuania saw numerous delays. Local Polish clergy were active in agitating against leaving, and the underground press called those who had registered for repatriation traitors. Many ethnic Poles hoped that a post-war Peace Conference would assign the Vilnius region to Poland. After these hopes vanished, the number of people wanting to leave gradually increased, and they signed papers for the People's Republic of Poland State Repatriation Office representatives.

The Lithuanian communist party was dominated by a nationalist faction which supported the removal of the Polish intelligentsia, particularly from the highly contested Vilnius region. The city of Vilnius was considered a historical capital of Lithuania; however, in the early 20th century its population was around 40% Polish, 30% Jewish and 20% Russian and Belarusian, with only about 2–3% self-declared Lithuanians. The government considered the rural Polish population important to the agricultural economy, and believed those people would be relatively amenable to assimilation policies (Lithuanization).

But the government encouraged expulsion of Poles from Vilnius, and facilitated it. The result was a rapid depolonization and Lithuanization of the city (80% of the local Polish population left Vilnius). Furthermore, the Lithuanian ideology of "Ethnographic Lithuania" declared that many people who identified as Polish were in fact "polonized Lithuanians". The rural population was denied the right to leave Lithuania, due to their lack of official pre-war documentation showing Polish citizenship. Contrary to the government's agreement with Poland, many individuals were threatened with either arrest or having to settle outstanding debts if they chose repatriation. Soviet authorities persecuted individuals connected to the Polish resistance (Armia Krajowa and Polish Underground State). In the end, about 50% of the 400,000 people registered for relocation were allowed to leave. Political scientist Dovilė Budrytė estimated that about 150,000 people left for Poland.

== See also ==
- Expulsion of Germans after World War II
- Polish minority in Belarus
- Polish minority in Lithuania
- Polish minority in Ukraine
- Population transfer in the Soviet Union
- Massacres of Poles in Volhynia and Eastern Galicia
- Operation Vistula
- Recovered Territories
- State Repatriation Office
- Repatriation of Poles (1955–1959)
- Birch bark letters from Siberia
