= Kresy =

Former eastern regions of Poland

Eastern Borderlands
Kresy Wschodnie
- Part of the Second Polish Republic
- In the wake of the 1939 Molotov–Ribbentrop Pact, the Eastern Borderlands (grey) were annexed directly into the Soviet Union. The Soviet gains east of the Curzon line devised in 1919 were confirmed (with minor adjustments in the areas around Białystok and Przemyśl) by the Western Allies at the Tehran Conference, the Yalta Conference and the Potsdam Conference. In 1945, most of Germany's territory east of the Oder–Neisse line (pink) was ceded to what remained of Poland (white), both of which would compose the newly created People's Republic of Poland

Historical region
- Period: 1919–1939; 1945
- Area: Territories of Poland annexed by the Soviet Union in the Invasion of Poland of 1939
- Today part of: Ukraine; Belarus; Lithuania

The Kresy Wschodnie, standing for Eastern Borderlands, or simply Kresy (Note: In Polish, "kresy" means "borderlands", but there are also "Kresy zachodnie", or Western Borderlands) (Borderlands; Polish pronunciation: [ˈkrɛsɨ]), was a historical region of the eastern part of the Second Polish Republic. The term was coined during the interwar period (1918–1939). Largely agricultural and extensively multi-ethnic with a Polish minority, it amounted to nearly half of the territory of interwar Poland. Historically situated in the eastern Polish–Lithuanian Commonwealth, following the 18th century foreign partitions, it was divided between the Empires of Russia and Austria-Hungary, and ceded to Poland in 1921 after the Treaty of Riga. As a result of the post-World War II border changes, all of the territory was ceded to the Soviet Union, and today the area of Kresy is divided between Western Ukraine, Western Belarus, and south-eastern Lithuania.

The region gave rise to the Kresy myth, a collection of nostalgic views about the area. After the fall of Communism in Europe and dissolution of the Soviet Union, a major economic conflict emerged about the real estate lost by Poland with the loss of Kresy.

In contemporary studies, the term has been described as colonial and compared to similar other terms such as Russian "okrainy", which in the past was used by Russian imperial authorities to describe its borderlands, which included partitioned Poland.

== Extents ==
During the existence of the Polish–Lithuanian Commonwealth, Kresy only referred to the borderlands of the Kingdom of Poland and not the Grand Duchy of Lithuania. Kresy is also largely co-terminous with the northern areas of the Pale of Settlement, a scheme devised by Catherine II of Russia to limit Jews from settling in the homogenously Christian Orthodox core of the Russian Empire, such as Moscow and Saint Petersburg. The Pale was established after the Second Partition of Poland and lasted until the Russian Revolution in 1917, when the Russian Empire ceased to exist. In the aftermath of the Polish wars against Ukraine, Lithuania and Soviet Russia, the latter of which was ended by the Treaty of Riga, large parts of the Austrian and Russian partitions became part of Poland. As many as 12 million inhabitants lived in the Eastern Borderlands, but ethnic Poles only were a third of that population, with another third being Ukrainian. Most small towns in the Borderlands were shtetls.

Administratively, the Eastern Borderlands territory was composed of Białystok, Lwów, Nowogródek, Polesie, Stanisławów, Tarnopol, Wilno and Wołyń voivodeships (provinces). Today, of these regions, only the western portions of Białystok and Lwów voivodeships remain in Poland (including the eponymous city in Białystok but not Lwów); the remainder of the area is divided between Western Ukraine, Western Belarus, and south-eastern Lithuania, with the major cities of Lviv, Vilnius, and Grodno no longer in Poland. During the Second Polish Republic, the Eastern Borderlands denoted the lands beyond the Curzon Line proposed after World War I in December 1919 by the British Foreign Office as the eastern border of the re-emerging sovereign Polish Republic, after over a century of partition. The interwar period in Kresy was noted by an active policy of Polonization of the local population, which involved enforced usage of Polish language in education as well as settling of the Polish colonists, Osadniks.

In September 1939, after Germany invaded Poland and follow-up invasion by Soviet Union, in accordance with Molotov–Ribbentrop Pact all Eastern Borderlands territories were incorporated into the Soviet republics of Ukraine, Belarus and Lithuania, often by means of terror. Soviet territorial annexations during World War II were later ratified by the Allies at the Conferences of Tehran, Yalta and Potsdam and most of Poles here were expelled after the end of World War II in Europe. After the dissolution of the Soviet Union in 1991, there was no change to the post-World War II borders. Despite the former provinces of the Eastern Borderlands no longer being part of Poland, a Polish minority remains.

== Etymology ==
Polish voivodeships 1922–1939. One can consider the six easternmost voivodeships as roughly equivalent with Kresy.

The Polish word kresy ("borderlands") is the plural form of the word kres meaning 'edge'. According to Zbigniew Gołąb, it is "a medieval borrowing from the German word Kreis", which in the Middle Ages meant Kreislinie, Umkreis, Landeskreis ("borderline, delineation or circumscribed territory"). Samuel Linde in his Dictionary of the Polish Language gives a different etymology of the term. According to him, kresy meant the borderline between Poland and the Crimean Khanate, in the region of the lower Dnieper. The term kresy appeared for the first time in literature in Wincenty Pol poems, "Mohort" (1854) and "Pieśń o ziemi naszej". Pol claimed that Kresy was the line between the Dniester and Dnieper rivers, neighbouring the Tatar borderland. Coincidentally in relation to Jewish settlement in the macro region, the notion of the pale is an archaic English term derived from the Latin word palus, (which in Polish exists as pal and also means a stake), extended in this instance to mean the area enclosed by a fence or boundary.

At the beginning of the 20th century, the meaning of the term expanded to include the lands of the former eastern provinces of the Polish–Lithuanian Commonwealth, east of the Lwów–Wilno line. In the Second Polish Republic, Kresy equated to historically Polish settled lands to the east of the notional Curzon line. Currently, the term applies to all the eastern lands of the Second Polish Republic that are no longer within the frontiers of modern Poland, together with lands further east, that had been integral to the Commonwealth before 1772, and where Polish communities continue to exist.

== History ==
Polish eastern settlements date back to the dawn of Poland as a state. In 1018, King Bolesław I the Brave invaded Kievan Rus' (see Bolesław I's intervention in the Kievan succession crisis, 1018), capturing Kyiv, and annexing the Cherven Cities. In 1340, Red Ruthenia came under Polish control, which intensified defensive Polish settlement and the introduction of Catholicism. After the Union of Lublin 1569, more Polish settlers moved into the eastern borderlands of the vast Polish–Lithuanian Commonwealth. Most of them came from the Polish provinces of Mazovia and Lesser Poland. They had moved gradually eastwards settling in sparsely populated areas, inhabited by earlier inhabitants such as Lithuanians and Ruthenians. Moreover, the indigenous upper classes of Kresy adopted Polish catholicism, culture and language, resulting in their assimilation and Polonization.

=== The Partitions of Poland ===
The year 1772 marked the first partition of the Commonwealth of the Kingdom of Poland and the Grand Duchy of Lithuania (see Partitions of Poland). By 1795, the whole eastern half of the state had been annexed by the Russian Empire in concert with the Habsburgs and Prussia's Hohenzollerns. The dramatic westward expansion of the Russian Empire through the annexation of Polish-Lithuanian territory substantially increased the new "Russian" Jewish population. Kresy and the superimposed Pale, in the former Polish and Lithuanian territories, had a Jewish population of over five million, and represented the largest community (40%) of the world Jewish population at that time.

From the Polish perspective, the lands came to be called the "Stolen Lands". Even though Poles were a minority in those areas, owing to forced depopulation, the "Stolen Lands" remained an integral part of Polish national identity, with Polish cultural centres and seats of learning in Vilnius University, Jan Kazimierz University and Krzemieniec Lyceum among many others. Since many local educated inhabitants had actively participated in Polish–Lithuanian national insurgencies (November Uprising, January Uprising), the Russian authorities resorted to intensified persecution, confiscations of property and land, penal deportation to Siberia, and the systematic attempt at Russification of Poles and their traditional culture and institutions.

=== The Pale of Settlement ===
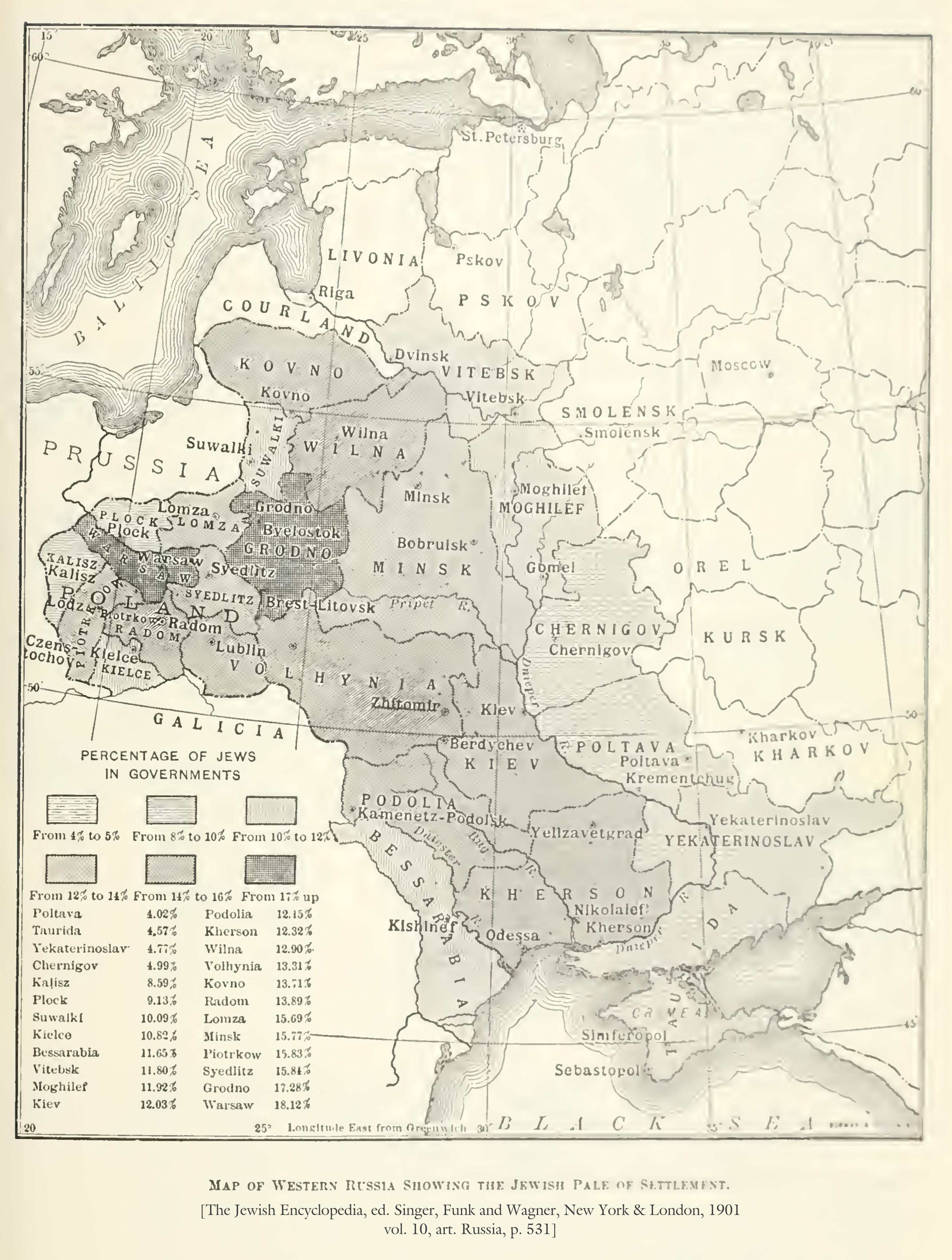
The Pale of Settlement

From the Russian perspective the "Pale of Settlement" included all of Belarus, Lithuania and Moldova, much of present-day Ukraine, parts of eastern Latvia, eastern Poland, and some parts of western Russia, generally corresponding to the Kresy macroregion and the modern-day western border of Russia. It extended from the eastern pale, or demarcation line, to the Russian border with the Kingdom of Prussia (later the German Empire) and Austria-Hungary. It also comprised about 20% of the territory of European Russia and largely corresponded to historical lands of the former Polish–Lithuanian Commonwealth, Cossack Hetmanate, and the Ottoman Empire (with Crimean Khanate).

The area included in the Pale, with its large Roman Catholic, Eastern Catholic and Jewish populations, was acquired through a series of military conquests and diplomatic manoeuvres, between 1654 and 1815. While the religious nature of the edicts creating the Pale is clear: conversion to Russian Orthodoxy, the state religion, released individuals from the strictures - historians argue that the motivations for its creation and maintenance were primarily economic and nationalistic in nature.

=== Economic decline of Kresy ===
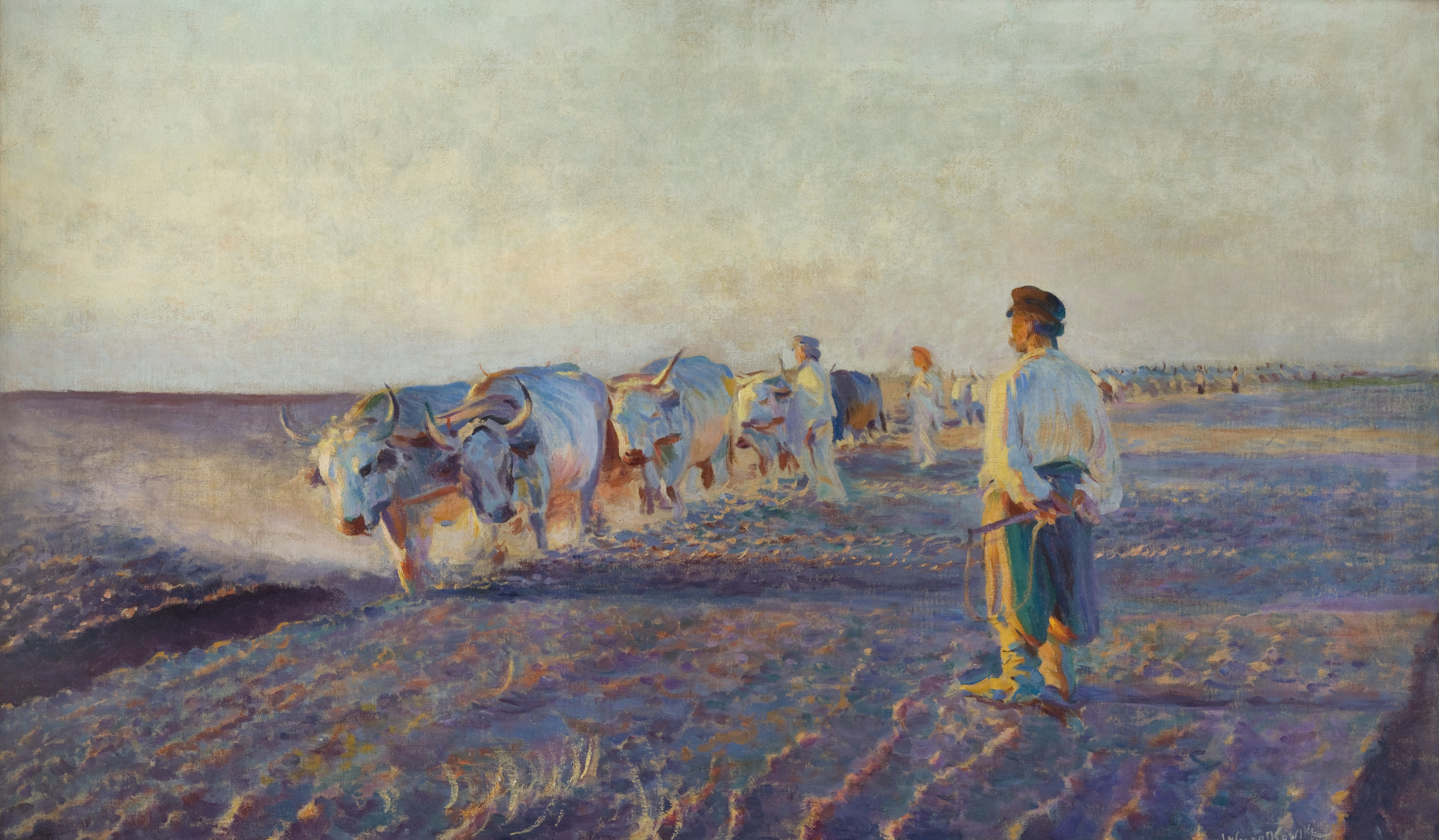
Leon Wyczółkowski "Ploughing in the Ukraine"

The Russian Empire had abandoned Kresy to decline as a vast rural backwater after the original Polish–Lithuanian landowners had been disposed of in the wake of insurrections and the Abolition of serfdom in Poland in 1864. The devastation of country estates put a halt to large scale economic activity which had depended on agriculture, forestry, brewing and small scale industries.

Paradoxically, the Southern Kresy (present-day Ukraine) was famous for its fertile soil and was known as the "bread basket of Europe". Towards the end of the 19th century, the decline was so acute that trade and food supplies became problematic and large scale emigration from towns and villages began as Jewish communities, in particular, began heading West, to Europe and the United States. By the time of a newly resurgent Polish state, the provinces had been additionally disadvantaged by having the lowest literacy levels in the country, since education had not been compulsory during Russian rule. The regions had suffered a legacy of decades of neglect and underinvestment so were generally less economically developed than the western parts of interwar Poland.

=== Between the World Wars ===
The West Ukrainian People's Republic in 1919

The years 1918–1921 were especially turbulent for Kresy, due to the resurgence of the Polish nation-state and the formation of new borders. At that time, Poland had fought three wars to establish its eastern frontier: with Ukraine, Lithuania and Soviet Russia. In all three conflicts, Poland made territorial conquests, and as a result, it seized territories east of the Curzon line that were previously conquered by Russia, in addition to the land formerly part of the Austrian Galicia. The Kresy was the most war-devastated area in the whole of interwar Poland. The region later formed the eastern provinces of the Second Polish Republic.

Territories included in the Kresy during the interbellum period comprised the eastern parts of the Voivodeships of Lwów and Białystok and the whole of the Nowogródek, Polesie, Stanisławów, Tarnopol, Wilno, Wołyń Voivodeships. The Polish government undertook an active policy of Polonizing the Kresy to alter its ethnic profile in favour of the Poles. One of the ways to do so was through the Osadnik colonists.

These military colonists were one of the most "emotionalized" parts of the Polish government's policy in the Kresy and elicited opposition from the locals. The German historian Bernhard Chiari said that the Kresy were "the poorhouse of Poland", while the Yad Vashem historian Leonid Rein even wrote that "it would not be a great exaggeration to say it was the poor-house of the whole of Europe." This led to frequent conflicts with Ukrainian nationalists in the southeastern part of Kresy, which led to the pacification of Ukrainians in Eastern Galicia.

Numerous Polish communities continued to live beyond the eastern border of the Second Polish Republic, especially around Minsk, Zhytomyr and Berdychiv. In the late 1920s and early 1930s, the Soviet authorities created two Polish National Districts in Belarus and Ukraine, but during the Polish Operation of the NKVD, most of the Poles in those areas were murdered, while those remaining were forcibly resettled in Kazakhstan (see also Poles in the Soviet Union).

=== During and after World War II ===
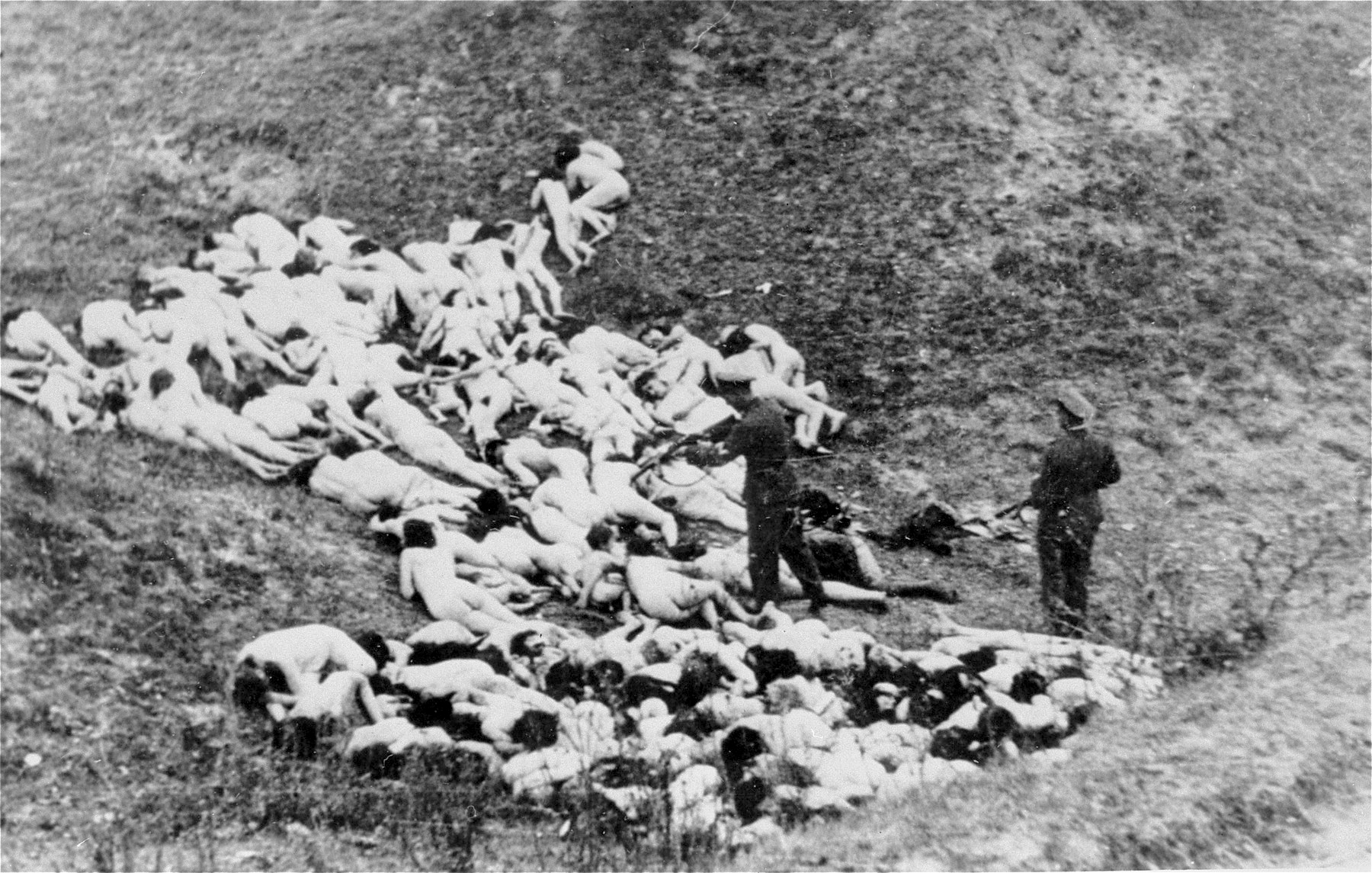
Members of the German Ordnungspolizei shooting naked women and children in the Mizoch Ghetto, October 1942

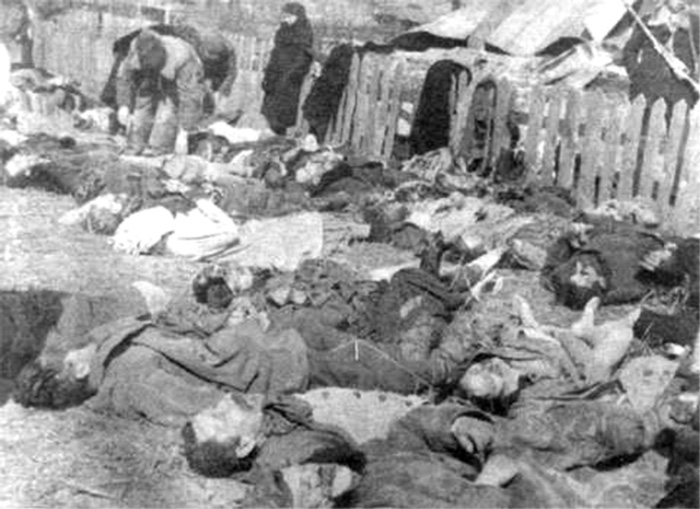
Massacres of Poles in Volhynia in 1943. Most Poles of Volhynia (now in Ukraine) had either been murdered or had fled the area.

As a consequence of the Molotov–Ribbentrop Pact, on 17 September 1939, the Kresy territories were annexed by the Soviet Union (see Soviet invasion of Poland), and a significant part of the ethnic Polish population of Kresy was deported to other areas of the Soviet Union including Siberia and Kazakhstan. The new border between Nazi Germany and the Soviet Union was re-designated by the German–Soviet Boundary and Friendship Treaty, signed on 29 September 1939. After the elections to the People's Assemblies of Western Ukraine and Western Belarus, communist governments for Western Ukraine and Western Belarus were formed and immediately announced their intention of joining their respective republics to the Soviet Union (see also Territories of Poland annexed by the Soviet Union). After the German invasion of the USSR, the southeastern part of Kresy was absorbed into Greater Germany's General Government, whereas the rest was integrated with the Reichskommissariats Ostland and Ukraine. In 1943–1944, units of the Ukrainian Insurgent Army, with the help of Ukrainian peasants, carried out mass exterminations of Poles living in southeastern Kresy (see Massacres of Poles in Volhynia and Eastern Galicia).

In January 1944, Soviet troops had reached the former Polish–Soviet border, and by the end of July 1944, they again re-annexed the whole territory that had been taken by the USSR in September 1939 into their control. During the Tehran Conference in 1943, a new Soviet-Polish border was established, in effect sanctioning most of the Soviet territorial acquisitions of September 1939 (except for some areas around Białystok and Przemyśl), ignoring protests from the Polish government-in-exile in London. The Potsdam Conference, via substantive recognition of the pro-Soviet Polish Committee of National Liberation, implicitly consented to the deportation of Polish people from Kresy (see Polish population transfers (1944–1946)). Most Polish inhabitants of Kresy were ordered by the Soviets to migrate west to Germany's former eastern provinces, newly emptied of their German population and renamed as the "Recovered Territories" of the Polish People's Republic, based on Polish medieval settlement of the areas. Poles from the southern Kresy (now Ukraine) were forced to settle mainly in Silesia, while those from the north (Belarus and Lithuania) moved to Pomerania and Masuria. Polish residents of Lwów settled not only in Wrocław, but also in Gliwice and in Bytom. Those cities had not been destroyed during the war. They were relatively closer to the new eastern border of Poland, which could become significant in case of a sudden hoped for a return to the East.

Frequently, whole Kresy villages and towns were deported in a single rail transport to new locations in the west. For instance, the village of Biała, near Chojnów, is still divided into two parts: Lower Biała and Upper Biała. Lower Biała was settled by people who used to live in a Bieszczady village of Polana near Ustrzyki Dolne (this area belonged to the Soviet Union until 1951: see 1951 Polish–Soviet territorial exchange), while inhabitants of the village Pyszkowce near Buczacz moved to Upper Biała. Every year in September, Biała is the scene of an annual festival called Kresowiana. In Szczecin and Polish West Pomerania, in the immediate postwar period, one-third of Polish settlers were either people from Kresy or Sybiraks. In 1948, people born in the Eastern Borderlands made up 47.5% of the population of Opole, 44.7% of Baborów, 47.5% of Wołczyn, 42.1% of Głubczyce, 40.1% of Lewin Brzeski, and 32.6% of Brzeg. In 2011, people with Kresy background made up 25% of the population of the Opole Voivodeship. The town of Jasień was settled by people from the area of Ternopil in late 1945 and early 1946, while Poles from Borschiv moved to Trzcińsko-Zdrój and Chojna. The situation was completely different in Wschowa and its county. In 1945–1948, more than 8,000 people moved there. They came from different areas of the Kresy — Ashmyany, Stanislawow, Równe, Lwów, Brody, Dzyatlava District, and Ternopil.

Altogether, between 1944 and 1946, more than a million Poles from the Kresy were moved to the Recovered Territories, including 150,000 from the area of Wilno, 226,300 from Polesia, 133,900 from Volhynia, 5,000 from Northern Bukovina, and 618,200 from Eastern Galicia. The so-called First Repatriation of Poles (1944–1946) was carried out in a chaotic, disorganized way. People had to spend weeks, even months at railroad stations, waiting for transport. During that time, they were robbed of their belongings by either locals, Soviet soldiers or Soviet rail workers. For lack of railroad cars, in Lithuania at some point the "one-suitcase policy" was introduced, which meant that Poles had to leave behind all their belongings. They travelled in freight or open wagons, and the journeys were long and dangerous, as there was no protection from the military or the police. In the years 1955–1959, the second mass repatriation of Poles from Kresy took place. As a result, in the years 1945–1960, over 2 million Polish people left Kresy. About 1-2 million more remained in the Kresy after 1960 (especially in the territories of the Lithuanian SSR and the Byelorussian SSR). Even today, Poles constitute the majority of inhabitants in many regions in the Grodno and Vilnius regions. Poles appear in the most recent national censuses as follows - Lithuania 183,000 (2021) ; Belarus 288,000 (2019) ; Ukraine 144,000 (2001) - the Belarus and Ukraine numbers firmly disputed in Poland.

In the immediate postwar period, Polish Communists, who ceded the Eastern Borderlands to the Soviet Union, were universally regarded as traitors, and Władysław Gomułka, First Secretary of the Polish Workers' Party, was fully aware of it. People who moved from the East to the Recovered Territories talked amongst themselves about their return to Lwów and other eastern locations, and the German return to Silesia, as a result of World War III, in which Western Allies would defeat the Soviets. One of the adages of the postwar period was: "Just one atom bomb, and we will be back in Lwów again. Just second one is small but strong and we will be back in Wilno again." ("Jedna bomba atomowa i wrócimy znów do Lwowa. Druga mała, ale silna i wrócimy znów do Wilna"). Polish settlers in former German areas were insecure about their future there until the 1970s (see Kniefall von Warschau). Eastern settlers did not feel at home in Lower Silesia, and as a result, they did not care about the machinery, households and farms abandoned by Germans. Lubomierz in 1945 was in good condition, but in the following years, Polish settlers from the area of Chortkiv in Podolia let it run down and become a ruin. The Germans were aware of it. In 1959, German sources wrote that Lower Silesia had been ruined by the Poles. Zdzisław Mach, a sociologist from the Jagiellonian University, explains that when Poles were forced to resettle in the West, which they resented, they had to leave the land they considered sacred and move to areas inhabited by the enemy. In addition, Communist authorities did not initially invest in the Recovered Territories because, like the settlers, for a long time they were unsure about the future of these lands. As Mach says, people in Western Poland for years lived "on their suitcases", with all their belongings packed in case of return to the East.

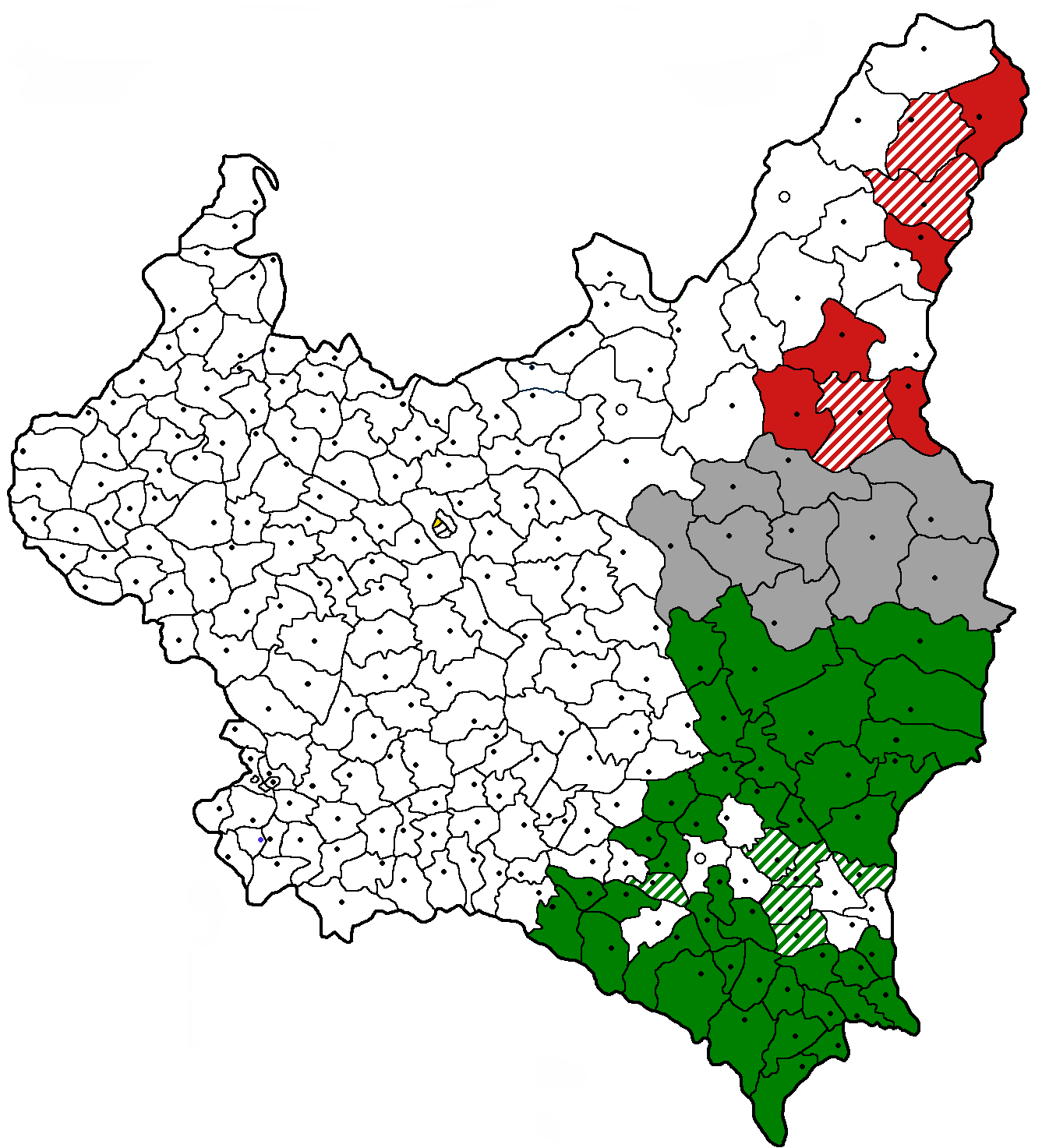
Map of interwar Poland according to the 1931 Polish census based on the most spoken native language in each powiat: Polish (white), Ukrainian (green), Belarusian (red) and "local language" such as Polesian or other dialects (grey). Shaded denotes subdivisions where the difference in share between the first and second most spoken languages is less than 5%.

== Interwar population ==
The population of Kresy was multi-ethnic, primarily comprising Poles, Ukrainians, Jews and Belarusians. According to official Polish statistics from the interwar period, Poles formed the largest linguistic group in these regions, and were demographically the largest ethnic group in the cities. Other national minorities included Lithuanians and Karaites (in the north), Jews (scattered in cities and towns across the area), Czechs and Germans (in Volhynia and East Galicia), Armenians and Hungarians (in Lviv) and also Russians and Tatars.

The proportions of different native languages in each voivodeship in 1931, according to the 1931 Polish census, were as follows:

Voivodeship	Polish	Belarusian	Ukrainian	Yiddish	Russian	German	Other
Wilno	60%	23%	_	8%	3%	_	8%
Nowogródek	53%	39%	_	7%	1%	_	_
Polesie	14%	6%	5%	10%	_	_	63% "Other" or Tutejszy (Polesian & other dialects)
Wołyń	17%	_	68%	10%	1%	2%	2%
Lwów	58%	_	34%	8%	_	_	_
Tarnopol	50%	_	45%	5%	_	_	_
Stanisławów	23%	_	69%	7%	_	1%	_

In addition to ethnic Poles in former eastern Poland, there were also large Polish communities in the USSR and in the Baltic states. Polish population east of the Curzon Line before World War II can be estimated by adding together figures for Former Eastern Poland and for pre-1939 Soviet Union:

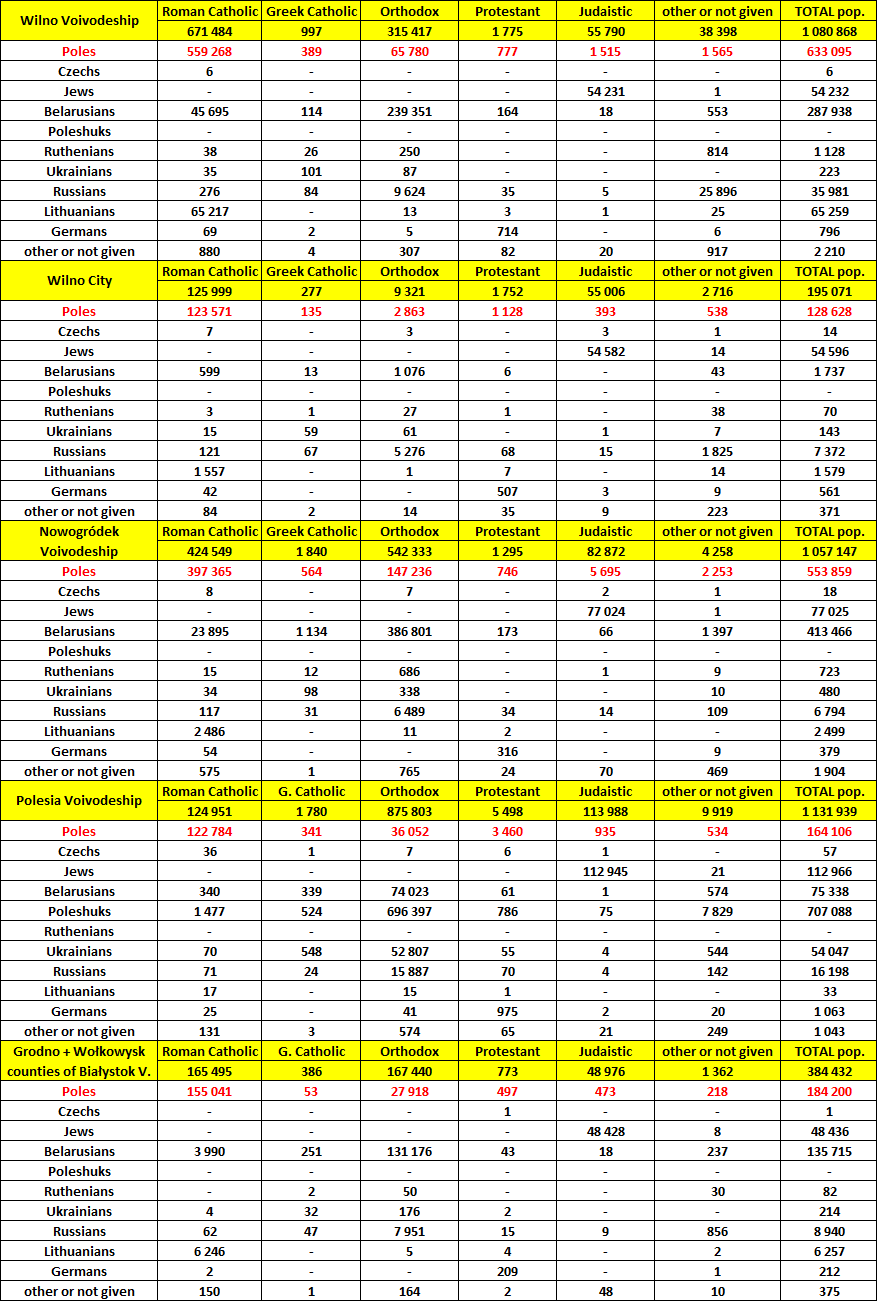
Linguistic (mother tongue) and religious structure of Northern Kresy (today parts of Belarus and Lithuania) according to the Polish census of 1931

1. Interwar Poland	Polish mother tongue (of whom Roman Catholics)	Source (census)	Today part of:
South-Eastern Poland	2,243,011 (1,765,765)	1931 Polish census	Ukraine
North-Eastern Poland	1,663,888 (1,358,029)	1931 Polish census	(Belarus) and (Lithuania)
2. Interwar USSR	Ethnic Poles according to official census	Source (census)	Today part of:
Soviet Ukraine	476,435	1926 Soviet census	Ukraine
Soviet Belarus	97,498	1926 Soviet census	Belarus
Soviet Russia	197,827	1926 Soviet census	Russia
rest of the USSR	10,574	1926 Soviet census	
3. Interwar Baltic states	Ethnic Poles according to official census	Source (census)	Today part of:
Lithuania	65,599 (Note: Polish sources estimated, based on the percentage of votes for Polish parties in the 1923 Lithuanian parliamentary election, that the real number of ethnic Poles in interwar Lithuania in 1923 was 202,026.)	1923 Lithuanian census	Lithuania
Latvia	59,374	1930 Latvian census	Latvia
Estonia	1,608	1934 Estonian census	Estonia
TOTAL (1., 2., 3.)	4 to 5 million ethnic Poles		

Two tables below show the linguistic (mother tongue) and religious structure of interwar South-Eastern Poland (nowadays part of Western Ukraine) and interwar North-Eastern Poland (nowadays part of Western Belarus and southern Lithuania) by county, according to the 1931 census.

South-East Poland:

Linguistic and religious structure of South-East Poland in 1931
County	Pop.	Polish	%	Yiddish & Hebrew	%	Ukrainian & Ruthenian	%	Other language (Note: Includes German and Czech, etc.)	%	Roman Catholic	%	Jewish	%	Uniate & Orthodox	%	Other religion (Note: Includes Protestants, Old Believers, etc.)	%
Dubno	226709	33987	15.0%	17430	7.7%	158173	69.8%	17119	7.6%	27638	12.2%	18227	8.0%	173512	76.5%	7332	3.2%
Horokhiv	122045	21100	17.3%	9993	8.2%	84224	69.0%	6728	5.5%	17675	14.5%	10112	8.3%	87333	71.6%	6925	5.7%
Kostopil	159602	34951	21.9%	10481	6.6%	105346	66.0%	8824	5.5%	34450	21.6%	10786	6.8%	103912	65.1%	10454	6.6%
Kovel	255095	36720	14.4%	26476	10.4%	185240	72.6%	6659	2.6%	35191	13.8%	26719	10.5%	187717	73.6%	5468	2.1%
Kremenets	243032	25758	10.6%	18679	7.7%	196000	80.6%	2595	1.1%	25082	10.3%	18751	7.7%	195233	80.3%	3966	1.6%
Liuboml	85507	12150	14.2%	6818	8.0%	65906	77.1%	633	0.7%	10998	12.9%	6861	8.0%	65685	76.8%	1963	2.3%
Lutsk	290805	56446	19.4%	34142	11.7%	172038	59.2%	28179	9.7%	55802	19.2%	34354	11.8%	177377	61.0%	23272	8.0%
Rivne	252787	36990	14.6%	37484	14.8%	160484	63.5%	17829	7.1%	36444	14.4%	37713	14.9%	166970	66.1%	11660	4.6%
Sarny	181284	30426	16.8%	16019	8.8%	129637	71.5%	5202	2.9%	28192	15.6%	16088	8.9%	132691	73.2%	4313	2.4%
Volodymyr	150374	40286	26.8%	17236	11.5%	88174	58.6%	4678	3.1%	38483	25.6%	17331	11.5%	89641	59.6%	4919	3.3%
Zdolbuniv	118334	17826	15.1%	10787	9.1%	81650	69.0%	8071	6.8%	17901	15.1%	10850	9.2%	86948	73.5%	2635	2.2%
Borshchiv	103277	46153	44.7%	4302	4.2%	52612	50.9%	210	0.2%	28432	27.5%	9353	9.1%	65344	63.3%	148	0.1%
Brody	91248	32843	36.0%	7640	8.4%	50490	55.3%	275	0.3%	22521	24.7%	10360	11.4%	58009	63.6%	358	0.4%
Berezhany	103824	48168	46.4%	3716	3.6%	51757	49.9%	183	0.2%	41962	40.4%	7151	6.9%	54611	52.6%	100	0.1%
Buchach	139062	60523	43.5%	8059	5.8%	70336	50.6%	144	0.1%	51311	36.9%	10568	7.6%	77023	55.4%	160	0.1%
Chortkiv	84008	36486	43.4%	6474	7.7%	40866	48.6%	182	0.2%	33080	39.4%	7845	9.3%	42828	51.0%	255	0.3%
Kamianka-Buzka	82111	41693	50.8%	4737	5.8%	35178	42.8%	503	0.6%	29828	36.3%	6700	8.2%	45113	54.9%	470	0.6%
Kopychyntsi	88614	38158	43.1%	5164	5.8%	45196	51.0%	96	0.1%	31202	35.2%	7291	8.2%	50007	56.4%	114	0.1%
Pidhaitsi	95663	46710	48.8%	3464	3.6%	45031	47.1%	458	0.5%	38003	39.7%	4786	5.0%	52634	55.0%	240	0.3%
Peremyshliany	89908	52269	58.1%	4445	4.9%	32777	36.5%	417	0.5%	38475	42.8%	6860	7.6%	44002	48.9%	571	0.6%
Radekhiv	69313	25427	36.7%	3277	4.7%	39970	57.7%	639	0.9%	17945	25.9%	6934	10.0%	42928	61.9%	1506	2.2%
Skalat	89215	60091	67.4%	3654	4.1%	25369	28.4%	101	0.1%	45631	51.1%	8486	9.5%	34798	39.0%	300	0.3%
Ternopil	142220	93874	66.0%	5836	4.1%	42374	29.8%	136	0.1%	63286	44.5%	17684	12.4%	60979	42.9%	271	0.2%
Terebovlia	84321	50178	59.5%	3173	3.8%	30868	36.6%	102	0.1%	38979	46.2%	4845	5.7%	40452	48.0%	45	0.1%
Zalishchyky	72021	27549	38.3%	3261	4.5%	41147	57.1%	64	0.1%	17917	24.9%	5965	8.3%	48069	66.7%	70	0.1%
Zbarazh	65579	32740	49.9%	3142	4.8%	29609	45.2%	88	0.1%	24855	37.9%	3997	6.1%	36468	55.6%	259	0.4%
Zboriv	81413	39624	48.7%	2522	3.1%	39174	48.1%	93	0.1%	26239	32.2%	5056	6.2%	49925	61.3%	193	0.2%
Zolochiv	118609	56628	47.7%	6066	5.1%	55381	46.7%	534	0.5%	36937	31.1%	10236	8.6%	70663	59.6%	773	0.7%
Dolyna	118373	21158	17.9%	9031	7.6%	83880	70.9%	4304	3.6%	15630	13.2%	10471	8.8%	89811	75.9%	2461	2.1%
Horodenka	92894	27751	29.9%	5031	5.4%	59957	64.5%	155	0.2%	15519	16.7%	7480	8.1%	69789	75.1%	106	0.1%
Kalush	102252	18637	18.2%	5109	5.0%	77506	75.8%	1000	1.0%	14418	14.1%	6249	6.1%	80750	79.0%	835	0.8%
Kolomyia	176000	52006	29.5%	11191	6.4%	110533	62.8%	2270	1.3%	31925	18.1%	20887	11.9%	121376	69.0%	1812	1.0%
Kosiv	93952	6718	7.2%	6730	7.2%	79838	85.0%	666	0.7%	4976	5.3%	7826	8.3%	80903	86.1%	247	0.3%
Nadvírna	140702	16907	12.0%	11020	7.8%	112128	79.7%	647	0.5%	15214	10.8%	11663	8.3%	113116	80.4%	709	0.5%
Rohatyn	127252	36152	28.4%	6111	4.8%	84875	66.7%	114	0.1%	27108	21.3%	9466	7.4%	90456	71.1%	222	0.2%
Stanyslaviv	198359	49032	24.7%	26996	13.6%	120214	60.6%	2117	1.1%	42519	21.4%	29525	14.9%	123959	62.5%	2356	1.2%
Stryi	152631	25186	16.5%	15413	10.1%	106183	69.6%	5849	3.8%	23404	15.3%	17115	11.2%	108159	70.9%	3953	2.6%
Sniatyn	78025	17206	22.1%	4341	5.6%	56007	71.8%	471	0.6%	8659	11.1%	7073	9.1%	61797	79.2%	496	0.6%
Tlumach	116028	44958	38.7%	3677	3.2%	66659	57.5%	734	0.6%	31478	27.1%	6702	5.8%	76650	66.1%	1198	1.0%
Zhydachiv	83817	16464	19.6%	4728	5.6%	61098	72.9%	1527	1.8%	15094	18.0%	5289	6.3%	63144	75.3%	290	0.3%
Bibrka	97124	30762	31.7%	5533	5.7%	60444	62.2%	385	0.4%	22820	23.5%	7972	8.2%	66113	68.1%	219	0.2%
Dobromyl	93970	35945	38.3%	4997	5.3%	52463	55.8%	565	0.6%	25941	27.6%	7522	8.0%	59664	63.5%	843	0.9%
Drohobych	194456	91935	47.3%	20484	10.5%	79214	40.7%	2823	1.5%	52172	26.8%	28888	14.9%	110850	57.0%	2546	1.3%
Horodok	85007	33228	39.1%	2975	3.5%	47812	56.2%	992	1.2%	22408	26.4%	4982	5.9%	56713	66.7%	904	1.1%
Yavoriv	86762	26938	31.0%	3044	3.5%	55868	64.4%	912	1.1%	18394	21.2%	5161	5.9%	62828	72.4%	379	0.4%
Lviv City	312231	198212	63.5%	75316	24.1%	35137	11.3%	3566	1.1%	157490	50.4%	99595	31.9%	50824	16.3%	4322	1.4%
Lviv County	142800	80712	56.5%	1569	1.1%	58395	40.9%	2124	1.5%	67430	47.2%	5087	3.6%	67592	47.3%	2691	1.9%
Mostyska	89460	49989	55.9%	2164	2.4%	37196	41.6%	111	0.1%	34619	38.7%	5428	6.1%	49230	55.0%	183	0.2%
Rava-Ruska	122072	27376	22.4%	10991	9.0%	82133	67.3%	1572	1.3%	22489	18.4%	13381	11.0%	84808	69.5%	1394	1.1%
Rudky	79170	38417	48.5%	4247	5.4%	36254	45.8%	252	0.3%	27674	35.0%	5396	6.8%	45756	57.8%	344	0.4%
Sambir	133814	56818	42.5%	7794	5.8%	68222	51.0%	980	0.7%	43583	32.6%	11258	8.4%	78527	58.7%	446	0.3%
Sokal	109111	42851	39.3%	5917	5.4%	59984	55.0%	359	0.3%	25425	23.3%	13372	12.3%	69963	64.1%	351	0.3%
Turka	114457	26083	22.8%	7552	6.6%	80483	70.3%	339	0.3%	6301	5.5%	10627	9.3%	97339	85.0%	190	0.2%
Zhovkva	95507	35816	37.5%	3344	3.5%	56060	58.7%	287	0.3%	20279	21.2%	7848	8.2%	66823	70.0%	557	0.6%
South-East Poland	6922206	2243011	32.4%	549782	7.9%	3983550	57.6%	145863	2.1%	1707428	24.7%	708172	10.2%	4387812	63.4%	118794	1.7%

North-East Poland:

Linguistic and religious structure of North-East Poland in 1931
County	Pop.	Polish	%	Yiddish & Hebrew	%	Belarusian, Poleshuk & Russian	%	Other language (Note: Includes Lithuanian and Ukrainian, etc.)	%	Roman Catholic	%	Jewish	%	Orthodox & Uniate	%	Other religion (Note: Includes Old Believers, Protestants, etc.)	%
Baranavichy	161038	74916	46.5%	15034	9.3%	70627	43.9%	461	0.3%	45126	28.0%	16074	10.0%	99118	61.5%	720	0.4%
Lida	183485	145609	79.4%	14546	7.9%	20538	11.2%	2792	1.5%	144627	78.8%	14913	8.1%	23025	12.5%	920	0.5%
Nyasvizh	114464	27933	24.4%	8754	7.6%	77094	67.4%	683	0.6%	22378	19.6%	8880	7.8%	82245	71.9%	961	0.8%
Novogrudok	149536	35084	23.5%	10326	6.9%	103783	69.4%	343	0.2%	28796	19.3%	10462	7.0%	109162	73.0%	1116	0.7%
Slonim	126510	52313	41.4%	10058	8.0%	63445	50.2%	694	0.5%	23817	18.8%	12344	9.8%	89724	70.9%	625	0.5%
Stowbtsy	99389	51820	52.1%	6341	6.4%	40875	41.1%	353	0.4%	37856	38.1%	6975	7.0%	54076	54.4%	482	0.5%
Shchuchyn	107203	89462	83.5%	6705	6.3%	10658	9.9%	378	0.4%	60097	56.1%	7883	7.4%	38900	36.3%	323	0.3%
Valozhyn	115522	76722	66.4%	5261	4.6%	33240	28.8%	299	0.3%	61852	53.5%	5341	4.6%	47923	41.5%	406	0.4%
Braslaw	143161	93958	65.6%	7181	5.0%	37689	26.3%	4333	3.0%	89020	62.2%	7703	5.4%	29713	20.8%	16725	11.7%
Dzisna	159886	62282	39.0%	11762	7.4%	85051	53.2%	791	0.5%	56895	35.6%	11948	7.5%	88118	55.1%	2925	1.8%
Molodechno	91285	35523	38.9%	5789	6.3%	49747	54.5%	226	0.2%	21704	23.8%	5910	6.5%	63074	69.1%	597	0.7%
Oshmyany	104612	84951	81.2%	6721	6.4%	11064	10.6%	1876	1.8%	81369	77.8%	7056	6.7%	15125	14.5%	1062	1.0%
Pastavy	99907	47917	48.0%	2683	2.7%	49071	49.1%	236	0.2%	50751	50.8%	2769	2.8%	44477	44.5%	1910	1.9%
Švenčionys	136475	68441	50.1%	7654	5.6%	16814	12.3%	43566	31.9%	117524	86.1%	7678	5.6%	1978	1.4%	9295	6.8%
Vilyeyka	131070	59477	45.4%	5934	4.5%	65220	49.8%	439	0.3%	53168	40.6%	6113	4.7%	70664	53.9%	1125	0.9%
Vilnius-Trakai	214472	180546	84.2%	6508	3.0%	9263	4.3%	18155	8.5%	201053	93.7%	6613	3.1%	2988	1.4%	3818	1.8%
Vilnius City	195071	128628	65.9%	54596	28.0%	9109	4.7%	2738	1.4%	125999	64.6%	55006	28.2%	9598	4.9%	4468	2.3%
Brest	215927	50248	23.3%	32089	14.9%	115323	53.4%	18267	8.5%	43020	19.9%	32280	14.9%	135911	62.9%	4716	2.2%
Drahichyn	97040	6844	7.1%	6947	7.2%	81557	84.0%	1692	1.7%	5699	5.9%	6981	7.2%	83147	85.7%	1213	1.3%
Kamin-Kashyrskyi	94988	6692	7.0%	4014	4.2%	75699	79.7%	8583	9.0%	6026	6.3%	4037	4.3%	83113	87.5%	1812	1.9%
Kobryn	113972	10040	8.8%	10489	9.2%	71435	62.7%	22008	19.3%	8973	7.9%	10527	9.2%	93426	82.0%	1046	0.9%
Kosava	83696	8456	10.1%	6300	7.5%	68769	82.2%	171	0.2%	7810	9.3%	6333	7.6%	68941	82.4%	612	0.7%
Luninyets	108663	16535	15.2%	7811	7.2%	83769	77.1%	548	0.5%	13754	12.7%	8072	7.4%	85728	78.9%	1109	1.0%
Pinsk	184305	29077	15.8%	25088	13.6%	128787	69.9%	1353	0.7%	16465	8.9%	25385	13.8%	140022	76.0%	2433	1.3%
Pruzhany	108583	17762	16.4%	9419	8.7%	81032	74.6%	370	0.3%	16311	15.0%	9463	8.7%	82015	75.5%	794	0.7%
Stolin	124765	18452	14.8%	10809	8.7%	92253	73.9%	3251	2.6%	6893	5.5%	10910	8.7%	105280	84.4%	1682	1.3%
Grodno	213105	101089	47.4%	35354	16.6%	69832	32.8%	6830	3.2%	89122	41.8%	35693	16.7%	87205	40.9%	1085	0.5%
Volkovysk	171327	83111	48.5%	13082	7.6%	74823	43.7%	311	0.2%	76373	44.6%	13283	7.8%	80621	47.1%	1050	0.6%
North-East Poland	3849457	1663888	43.2%	347255	9.0%	1696567	44.1%	141747	3.7%	1512478	39.3%	356632	9.3%	1915317	49.7%	65030	1.7%

=== Largest cities and towns ===
In 1931, according to the Polish National Census, the ten largest cities in Polish Eastern Borderlands were: Lwów (pop. 312,200), Wilno (pop. 195,100), Stanisławów (pop. 60,000), Grodno (pop. 49,700), Brześć nad Bugiem (pop. 48,400), Borysław (pop. 41,500), Równe (pop. 40,600), Tarnopol (pop. 35,600), Łuck (pop. 35,600) and Kołomyja (pop. 33,800).

In addition, Daugavpils (pop. 43,200 in 1930) in inter-war Latvia was also a major Polish community with 21% ethnic Polish inhabitants.

Ethnolinguistic structure (mother tongue) of the population in 24 largest cities and towns in Kresy according to the censuses of 1931 and 1930
City	Pop.	Polish	Yiddish & Hebrew	German	Ukrainian & Ruthenian	Belarusian	Russian	Lithuanian	Other	Today part of:
Lwów	312,231	63.5% (198,212)	24.1% (75,316)	0.8% (2,448)	11.3% (35,137)	0% (24)	0.1% (462)	0% (6)	0.2% (626)	Ukraine
Wilno	195,071	65.9% (128,628)	28% (54,596)	0.3% (561)	0.1% (213)	0.9% (1,737)	3.8% (7,372)	0.8% (1,579)	0.2% (385)	Lithuania
Stanisławów	59,960	43.7% (26,187)	38.3% (22,944)	2.2% (1,332)	15.6% (9,357)	0% (3)	0.1% (50)	0% (1)	0.1% (86)	Ukraine
Grodno	49,669	47.2% (23,458)	42.1% (20,931)	0.2% (99)	0.2% (83)	2.5% (1,261)	7.5% (3,730)	0% (22)	0.2% (85)	Belarus
Brześć	48,385	42.6% (20,595)	44.1% (21,315)	0% (24)	0.8% (393)	7.1% (3,434)	5.3% (2,575)	0% (1)	0.1% (48)	Belarus
Daugavpils	43,226	20.8% (9,007)	26.9% (11,636)	-	-	2.3% (1,006)	19.5% (8,425)	-	30.4% (13,152)	Latvia
Borysław	41,496	55.3% (22,967)	25.4% (10,538)	0.5% (209)	18.5% (7,686)	0% (4)	0.1% (37)	0% (2)	0.1% (53)	Ukraine
Równe	40,612	27.5% (11,173)	55.5% (22,557)	0.8% (327)	7.9% (3,194)	0.1% (58)	6.9% (2,792)	0% (4)	1.2% (507)	Ukraine
Tarnopol	35,644	77.7% (27,712)	14% (5,002)	0% (14)	8.1% (2,896)	0% (2)	0% (6)	0% (0)	0% (12)	Ukraine
Łuck	35,554	31.9% (11,326)	48.6% (17,267)	2.3% (813)	9.3% (3,305)	0.1% (36)	6.4% (2,284)	0% (1)	1.5% (522)	Ukraine
Kołomyja	33,788	65% (21,969)	20.1% (6,798)	3.6% (1,220)	11.1% (3,742)	0% (0)	0% (6)	0% (2)	0.2% (51)	Ukraine
Drohobycz	32,261	58.4% (18,840)	24.8% (7,987)	0.4% (120)	16.3% (5,243)	0% (13)	0.1% (21)	0% (0)	0.1% (37)	Ukraine
Pińsk	31,912	23% (7,346)	63.2% (20,181)	0.1% (45)	0.3% (82)	4.3% (1,373)	9% (2,866)	0% (2)	0.1% (17)	Belarus
Stryj	30,491	42.3% (12,897)	31.4% (9,561)	1.6% (501)	24.6% (7,510)	0% (0)	0% (10)	0% (0)	0% (12)	Ukraine
Kowel	27,677	37.2% (10,295)	46.2% (12,786)	0.2% (50)	9% (2,489)	0.1% (27)	7.1% (1,954)	0% (1)	0.3% (75)	Ukraine
Włodzimierz	24,591	39.1% (9,616)	43.1% (10,611)	0.6% (138)	14% (3,446)	0.1% (18)	2.9% (724)	0% (0)	0.2% (38)	Ukraine
Baranowicze	22,818	42.8% (9,758)	41.3% (9,423)	0.1% (25)	0.2% (50)	11.1% (2,537)	4.4% (1,006)	0% (1)	0.1% (18)	Belarus
Sambor	21,923	61.9% (13,575)	24.3% (5,325)	0.1% (28)	13.2% (2,902)	0% (4)	0% (4)	0% (0)	0.4% (85)	Ukraine
Krzemieniec	19,877	15.6% (3,108)	36.4% (7,245)	0.1% (23)	42.4% (8,430)	0% (6)	4.4% (883)	0% (2)	0.9% (180)	Ukraine
Lida	19,326	63.3% (12,239)	32.6% (6,300)	0% (5)	0.1% (28)	2.1% (414)	1.7% (328)	0% (2)	0.1% (10)	Belarus
Czortków	19,038	55.2% (10,504)	25.5% (4,860)	0.1% (11)	19.1% (3,633)	0% (0)	0.1% (17)	0% (0)	0.1% (13)	Ukraine
Brody	17,905	44.9% (8,031)	35% (6,266)	0.2% (37)	19.8% (3,548)	0% (5)	0.1% (9)	0% (0)	0.1% (9)	Ukraine
Słonim	16,251	52% (8,452)	41.1% (6,683)	0.1% (9)	0.3% (45)	4% (656)	2.3% (369)	0% (2)	0.2% (35)	Belarus
Wołkowysk	15,027	49.6% (7,448)	38.8% (5,827)	0% (7)	0.1% (10)	6.9% (1,038)	4.6% (689)	0% (3)	0% (5)	Belarus

== Polish minority after World War II ==
Despite the expulsion of most of ethnic Poles from the Soviet Union between 1944 and 1958, the Soviet census of 1959 still counted around 1.5 million ethnic Poles remaining in the USSR:

Republic of the USSR	Ethnic Poles in 1959 census
Belarusian SSR	538,881
Ukrainian SSR	363,297
Lithuanian SSR	230,107
Latvian SSR	59,774
Estonian SSR	2,256
rest of the USSR	185,967
TOTAL	1,380,282

According to a more recent census, there were about 295,000 Poles in Belarus in 2009 (3.1% of the Belarus population).

== Notable people ==
A number of influential figures in Polish history were born in the area of kresy (note: the redirected list does not include Poles born in the cities of Lwów (Lviv), and Wilno (Vilnius) - see List of people from Lviv, List of people from Vilnius). The family of former President of Poland, Bronisław Komorowski, allegedly hails from northern Lithuania. The mother of Bogdan Zdrojewski, former Minister of Culture and National Heritage is from Boryslav, and the father of former First Lady Jolanta Kwaśniewska was born in Wołyń, where his sister was murdered in 1943 by the Ukrainian nationalists.

The macro region of Kresy denotes the Eastern historical provinces of the Kingdom of Poland and the Grand Duchy of Lithuania. In the 20th century during the Second Republic of Poland it was the term for its Eastern Borderlands. Following the "Fourth Partition of Poland", the Tehran, Yalta and Potsdam Conferences, in the wake of the Second World War, ratified the annexation of the Kresy territories by the Soviet Union. They were apportioned to Lithuania, Belarus and Ukraine where they remain.

A number of notable or influential figures from Polish history were born in the former macroregion (note: the following list does not include Poles born in the cities of Lwów (Lviv), and Wilno (Vilnius) - see List of Leopolitans, List of Vilnius-related people).

=== A ===
- Roman Aftanazy, historian and librarian, chronicler of the residences of the Eastern Borderlands, born in Morszyn, current Ukraine

=== B ===
- Jan Beyzym, priest, teacher, Jesuit missionary in Madagascar born in Stari Beyzymi, currently in Ukraine
- Tadeusz Borowski, writer and journalist, born in Zhitomir, current Ukraine
- Jan Brzechwa, poet, children's author and lawyer born in Żmerynka, Podolia, current Ukraine

=== C ===
- Tadeusz Czacki, historian, born in Poryck, now Pavlivka, current Ukraine
- Joseph Conrad, novelist in English, born in Berdychiv, current Ukraine
- Zbigniew Cybulski, stage and film actor, born in Kniaze, current Ukraine

=== D ===
- Ignacy Domeyko, 19th-century geologist, born in Niedźwiadka Wielka, current Belarus
- Benedykt Dybowski, naturalist and physician, born near Nowogródek, current Belarus

=== F ===
- Feliks Falk, film director, born in Stanisławów, current Ukraine

=== G ===
- Mieczysław Gębarowicz, art historian, soldier, custodian of cultural heritage
- Zygmunt Gloger, historian, archeologist, geographer and ethnographer, born in Kamionka Podolska, current Ukraine
- Artur Grottger, painter, born in Otynevychi, current Ukraine

=== H ===
- Mirosław Hermaszewski, astronaut, born in Lipniki, current Ukraine

=== I ===
- Jarosław Iwaszkiewicz, writer and poet, born in Kalnik, current Ukraine

=== J ===
- Wladyslaw Marian Jakowicki, soldier, physician, academic, rector of Stefan Batory University, born in Vitebsk, current Belarus
- Aleksander Jełowicki, Roman Catholic priest, publisher of Adam Mickiewicz and writer in Paris. born in Hubnyk, now in Ukraine.

=== K ===
- Jerzy Kawalerowicz, film director, born in Gwoździec, current Ukraine
- Hugo Kołłątaj, social and political activist, political thinker, historian and philosopher, born in Dederkały Wielkie, current Ukraine
- Tadeusz Konwicki, film director and writer, born in Nowa Wilejka, current Lithuania
- Ryszard Kapuściński, journalist, travel writer, Nobel nominee, born in Pinsk, current Belarus
- Tadeusz Kościuszko, national hero of Poland, Lithuania, the United States and Belarus, born in the village of Mereczowszczyzna, current Belarus
- Jerzy Kulczycki, civil engineer, activist publisher and bookseller in London

=== L ===
- Tadeusz Łomnicki, notable Polish actor of stage and screen, born in Podhajce, current Ukraine

=== M ===
- Stanisław Maczek, tank commander in World War II, exiled in Scotland, born in Szczerzec, current Ukraine
- Kornel Makuszyński, poet, creator of Koziolek Matolek, born in Stryj, current Ukraine
- Ernest Malinowski, railway engineer builder, defender of Peru, born in Seweryny, current Ukraine
- Tadeusz Manteuffel, historian, medievalist, born in Rezekne, now in Latvia
- Adam Mickiewicz, a Bard of Poland, poet born in Zaosie, current Belarus
- Czesław Miłosz, poet, prose writer, translator Nobel Laureate in Literature, diplomat, born in Seteniai, current Lithuania
- Stanisław Moniuszko, Polish/Belarusian conductor, composer and teacher born in Ubiel, current Belarus

=== N ===
- Gabriel Narutowicz, first President of the Second Polish Republic, born in Telšiai, current Lithuania
- Adam Naruszewicz, poet, historian, dramatist, translator, publicist and Jesuit, born in Pinsk, current Belarus
- Julian Ursyn Niemcewicz, poet, playwright and statesman, born near Brześć nad Bugiem, current Belarus
- Czesław Niemen, singer, born in Stare Wasiliszki, current Belarus

=== O ===
- Napoleon Orda, Polish-Lithuanian musician, composer and artist, born in Worocewicze, current Belarus
- Eliza Orzeszkowa, Positivist novelist, lost out Nobel Prize in Literature to Leo Tolstoy and Henryk Sienkiewicz, born in Milkowszczyzna, current Belarus
- Stanisław Julian Ostroróg, Crimean war veteran, exile, London and Paris early portrait photographer born in Mogilev current Belarus

=== P ===
- Ignacy Jan Paderewski, composer, diplomat, pianist, prime minister of Poland, born the village of Kurilovka, current Ukraine
- Aniela Pawlikowska, draughtswoman, graphic artist, illustrator, painter
- Józef Piłsudski, statesman, Chief of State, First Marshal, and leader of the Second Polish Republic, born in Zułów, current Lithuania
- Stanisław August Poniatowski, last King of Poland, born in Voŭčyn, current Belarus
- Jan Potocki, writer and adventurer, author of The Manuscript Found in Saragossa, born in Pikov, current Ukraine
- Stanisław "Rewera" Potocki, magnate and military leader, after whom the city of Stanisławów was named, born in Podhajce, current Ukraine

=== R ===
- Mikołaj Rej, renaissance poet and prose writer in Polish, born in Zurawno, current Ukraine
- Edward Rydz-Śmigły, marshal of Poland, born in Lapshin, current Ukraine
- Wacław Rzewuski, drama writer, poet, Grand Crown Hetman, ancestor of Balzac's wife, born in Rozdol, current Ukraine

=== S ===
- Konstanty Skirmunt, foreign minister (1921-1922), representative to the League of Nations, ambassador to London, born in Moładava, current Belarus
- Juliusz Słowacki, the father of modern Polish drama, born in Krzemieniec, current Ukraine
- John III Sobieski, King of Poland, saviour of Europe at Battle of Vienna, born in Olesko, current Ukraine
- Karol Szymanowski, pianist, composer, born in Tymoszówka, current Ukraine

=== T ===
- Jerzy Tabeau, cardiologist, as an imprisoned medical student he broke out of Auschwitz to report about the genocide, born in Zabolotiv, current Ukraine
- Wiktor Thommée, Brigadier General of the Polish Army, born in Švenčionys, current Lithuania
- Romuald Traugutt, commander of the January Uprising, born in the village of Szostakowo, near Brześć nad Bugiem, current Belarus
- Michał Tyszkiewicz, landowner, collector, egyptologist, born in Wołożyn, current Belarus

=== W ===
- Anna Walentynowicz, Solidarity legend, born in Równe, current Ukraine
- Michał Korybut Wiśniowiecki, King of Poland, born in Wiśniowiec, current Ukraine

=== Z ===
- Gabriela Zapolska, novelist, theatre critic and actor, born in Podhajce, current Ukraine
- Franciszek Żwirko, aviator, born in Švenčionys, current Lithuania

- Jozef J. Zwislocki, physicist and neuroscientist, born in Lwów.

== Cradle of Polish culture ==
Map of areas where Polish was used as a primary language in 1916

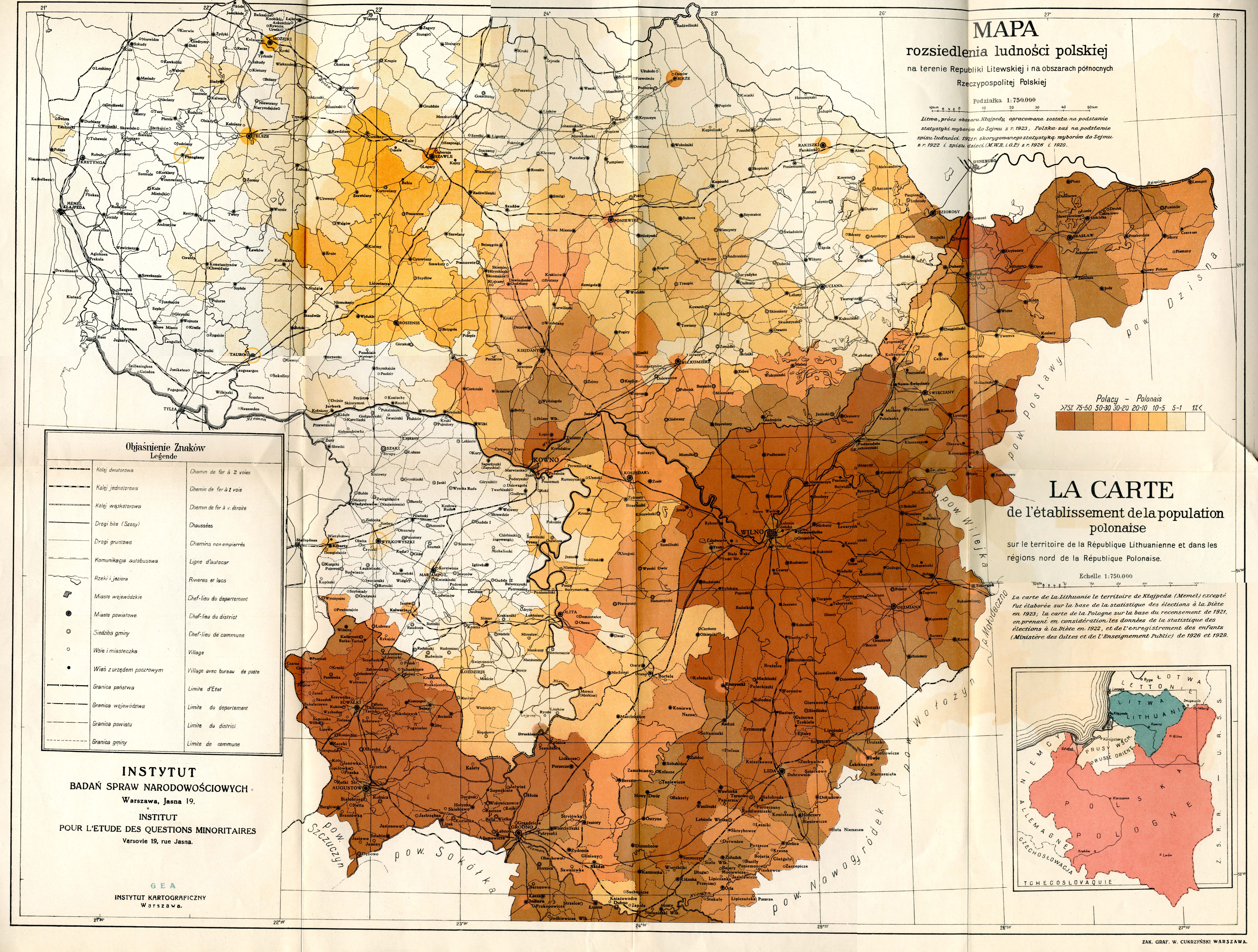
Map of the Polish population living in Lithuania on the basis of elections to the parliament of Lithuania in 1923, censuses in 1921 and elections to the Polish parliament in 1922

Map of the distribution of Poles in Kresy during the late 19th century over 50% Polish 30% – 50% Polish 20% – 30% Polish 10% – 20% Polish 5% – 10% Polish 3% – 5% Polish 1% – 3% Polish 0% – 1% Polish

Since some of the most distinguished names of Polish literature and music were born in Kresy, e.g. Mikołaj Rej, Adam Mickiewicz, Juliusz Słowacki, Karol Szymanowski or Czesław Miłosz, Eastern Borderlands have featured repeatedly in the Polish Literary canon. Mickiewicz's Pan Tadeusz begins with the Polish language invocation, "O Lithuania, my fatherland, thou art like good health...." Other notable works located in Kresy, are Nad Niemnem, Sanatorium Under the Sign of the Hourglass, With Fire and Sword, Fire in the Steppe. In Communist Poland, all Kresy-related topics, such as Poland's eastern centuries old heritage, including ecclesiastical architecture, country houses and stately homes down to the Massacres of Poles in Wołyń were banned from publication for Soviet propaganda reasons, because these lands now belonged to the Soviet Union. In official documents, people born in the Eastern Borderlands were declared as born in the Soviet Union, and very few Kresy-themed books or films were passed by the state censor at that time. One of the exceptions was the immensely popular comedy trilogy by Sylwester Chęciński (Sami swoi from 1967, Nie ma mocnych from 1974, and Kochaj albo rzuć from 1977). The trilogy tells the story of two quarreling families, who after the end of the Second World War were resettled from current Western Ukraine to Lower Silesia, after Poland was shifted westwards.

After the collapse of the Communist system, the old Kresy returned as a Polish cultural theme in the form of historical polemics. Numerous books and albums were published about the Eastern Borderlands, frequently with original photos from the prewar era. Examples of such publications include:

- Roman Aftanazy. Dzieje rezydencji na dawnych kresach Rzeczypospolitej. Wrocław: Wydawnictwo Ossolineum, 1991–1997. History of Residences in Poland's Former Eastern Borderlands, (1991–1997), listing and describing in a monumental eleven volume work the cultural heritage contained in the myriad estates and grand residences in the once Polish Kresy and Inflanty regions.
- Kresy in Photos of Henryk Poddębski, published in May 2010 in Lublin, with a foreword by people with a Kresy background - Anna Seniuk, Krzesimir Dębski and Maciej Płażyński
- The World of Kresy, with numerous photos, postcards and maps
- Sentimental Journeys. Travel across Kresy with Andrzej Wajda and Daniel Olbrychski
- The Encyclopedia of Kresy, with 3600 articles, and foreword by another famous person from Kresy, Stanisław Lem. Articles about the Eastern Borderlands frequently appear in Polish newspapers and magazines. The local office of Gazeta Wyborcza in Wrocław in late 2010 began a Kresy Family Album, stories and photos of those who were forced to move from the East.

In the first half of 2011, Rzeczpospolita daily published a series called "The Book of Eastern Borderlands" (Księga kresów wschodnich). The July 2012 issue of the Uważam Rze Historia magazine was dedicated to the Eastern Borderlands and their importance in Polish history and culture.

== Present day ==
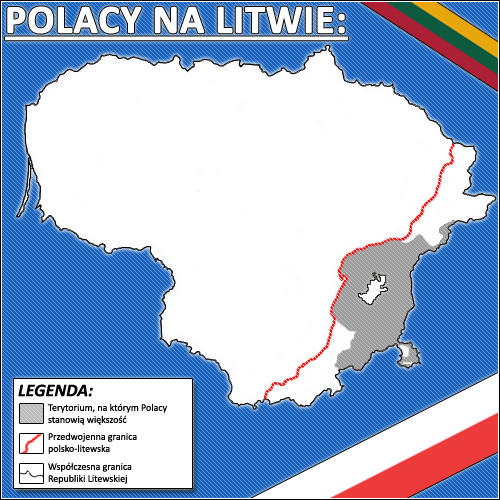
Grey: Areas with majority Polish population in modern Lithuania. Red: pre-World War II Polish-Lithuanian border

The territory known to Poles as Kresy is now partitioned off between the states of Ukraine, Belarus and Lithuania. Ethnic Poles still live in those areas: in Lithuania, they are the largest ethnic minority in the country (see Poles in Lithuania), in Belarus, they are the second largest ethnic minority in the country after Russians (see Poles in Belarus), and in Ukraine, they officially number 144,130, but some Polish organizations claim that the number of Poles in Ukraine may be as many as 2 million, most of them assimilated. (see Poles in Ukraine). Furthermore, there is a 50,000 Polish minority in Latvia. In Lithuania and Belarus, Poles are more numerous than in Ukraine. This is the result of the Polish population transfers (1944–1946) as well as Massacres of Poles in Volhynia. Those Poles who survived the slaughter begged for the opportunity to emigrate.

Many Polish organizations are active in the former Eastern Borderlands, such as the Association of Poles in Ukraine, Association of Polish Culture of the Lviv Land, the Federation of Polish Organizations in Ukraine, Union of Poles in Belarus, and the Association of Poles in Lithuania. There are Polish sports clubs (Pogoń Lwów, FK Polonia Vilnius), newspapers (Gazeta Lwowska, Kurier Wileński), radio stations (in Lviv and Vilnius), many theatres, schools, choirs and folk ensembles. Poles living in Kresy are helped by a government-sponsored organization Fundacja Pomoc Polakom na Wschodzie, and by other organizations, such as the Association of Help of Poles in the East Kresy (see also Karta Polaka). Money is frequently collected to help those Poles who live in Kresy, and there are several annual events, such as "Christmas Package for a Polish Veteran in Kresy", and "Summer with Poland", sponsored by Association "Polish Community", in which Polish children from Kresy are invited to visit Poland. Polish language handbooks and films, as well as medicines and clothes are collected and sent to Kresy. Books are most often sent to Polish schools which exist there — for example, in December 2010, University of Wrocław organized an event called "Become a Polish Santa Claus and Give a Book to a Polish Child in Kresy". Polish churches and cemeteries (such as Cemetery of the Defenders of Lwów) are renovated with money from Poland. For example, in Nysa, money is collected to renovate the Roman Catholic church in Łopatyn near Lviv, while residents of Oława collect funds to renovate the church in Sasiv, also in the area of Lviv. Also, physicians from Kraków's organization Doctors of Hope regularly visit Eastern Borderlands, and the Polish Ministry of Education runs a special program, which sends Polish teachers to the former Soviet Union. In 2007, more than 700 teachers worked in the East, most of them in Kresy. Studio East of Polish TV Wrocław organizes an event called "Save your grandfather's tomb from oblivion" (Mogiłę pradziada ocal od zapomnienia), during which students from Lower Silesia visit Western Ukraine, to clean Polish cemeteries there. In July 2011, about 150 students cleaned 16 cemeteries in the areas of Lviv, Ternopil, Podolia and Pokuttya.

Despite wars and ethnic cleansing many treasures of Polish culture still remain in the East. In Vilnius, there is the Wróblewski Library, with 160,000 volumes and 30,000 manuscripts, which now belong to the Lithuanian Academy of Sciences. In Lviv, there is the Ossolineum, one of the most important Polish culture centres. Adolf Juzwenko, current president of Wrocław's office of the Ossolineum, says that in 1945, there was a mass public campaign in Poland, aimed at transporting the whole Ossolineum to Wrocław. It succeeded in recovering only 200,000 volumes, as the Soviets decided that the bulk of the library had to remain in Lviv.

=== In contemporary Poland ===
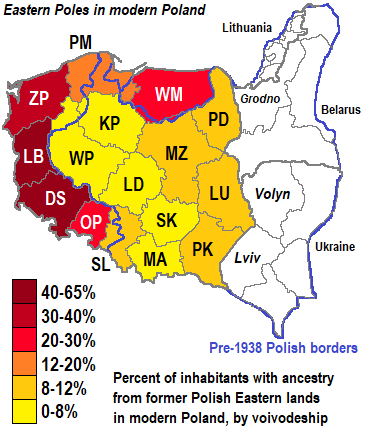
Percentage of Kresy Poles in modern Poland by region.

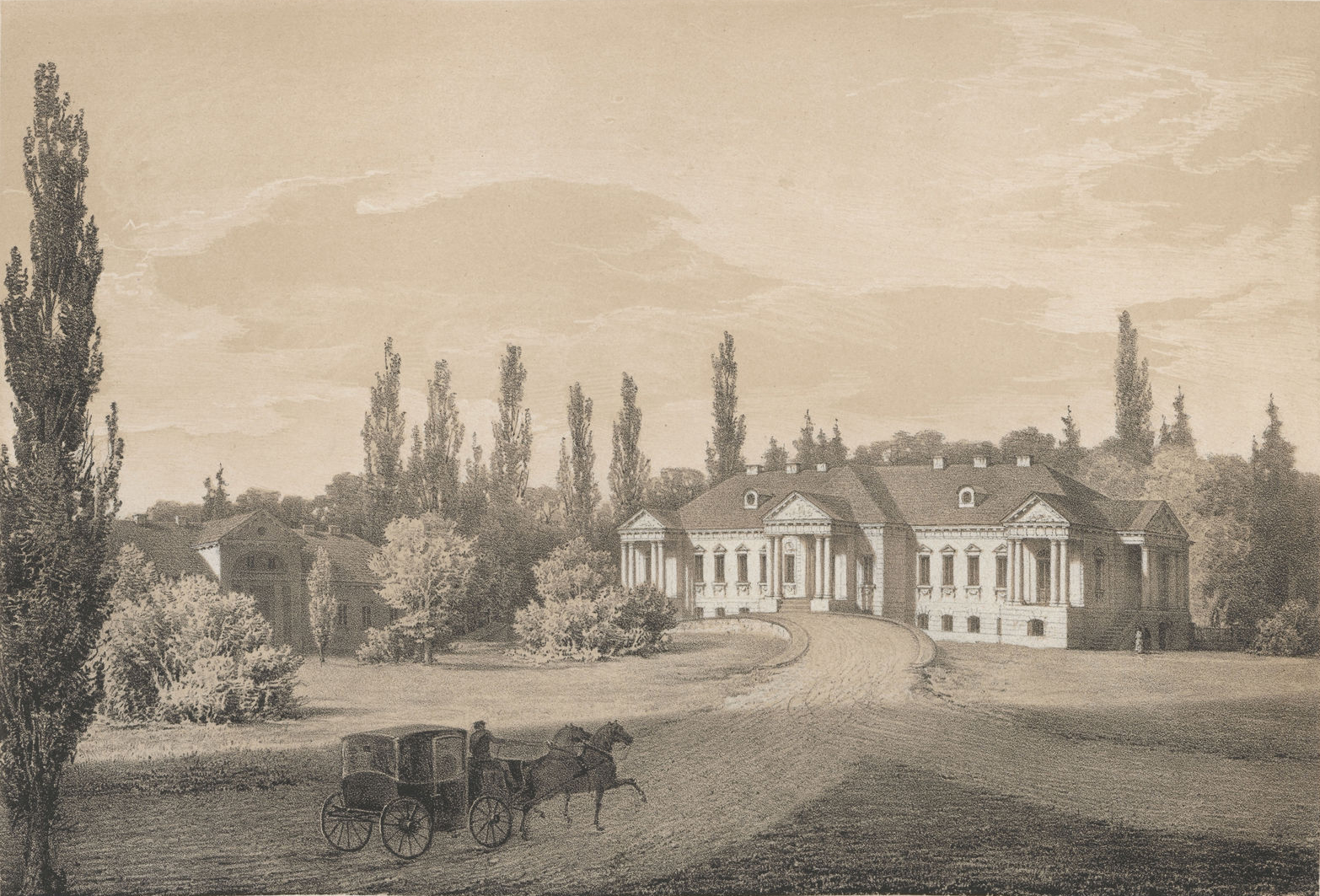
The Skirmunt estate, Moładaŭ, by Napoleon Orda 1875

Even though Poland lost its Eastern Borderlands in the aftermath of World War II, Poles connected with the Kresy still have some affection for those lands. Since Poles from current Western Ukraine mostly moved to Silesia. The cities of Wrocław and Gliwice are regarded as miasta lwowskie (cities of Lwów affinity), while Szczecin, Gdańsk and Olsztyn are regarded as miasta wileńskie (cities of Wilno affinity). Lwów's Ossolineum Foundation, its collections and famous library are now located in Wrocław. Polish academics from Lwów established the Polish University of Wrocław (taking over from the old German University of Breslau) and Silesian University of Technology in Gliwice. At the same time, Polish academics from Vilnius founded Nicolaus Copernicus University in Toruń (even though Toruń belonged to Poland before the outbreak of World War II before 1939).

There are numerous Kresy-oriented organizations, with the largest one, World Congress of Kresy Inhabitants (Światowy Kongres Kresowian), located in Bytom, and branches scattered across Poland, and abroad. The Congress organizes annual World Convention and Pilgrimage of Kresy Inhabitants to Jasna Góra Monastery.

Other important Kresy organisations, active in contemporary Poland, include:

- Polskie Towarzystwo Miłośników Miasta Krzemieńca i Ziemi Krzemienieckiej (Polish Association of Lovers of Krzemieniec and Krzemieniec Land) from Poznań;
- Stowarzyszenie Kresowe "Podkamień" (Kresy Association "Podkamien") from Wołów;
- Stowarzyszenie Odra-Niemen (Association Odra - Niemen) from Wrocław;
- Stowarzyszenie Przyjaciół Ziemi Drohobyckiej (Association of Friends of Drohobycz Land) from Legnica;
- Stowarzyszenie Rodzin Osadników Wojskowych i Cywilnych Kresów Wschodnich (Association of Families of Osadniks of Eastern Borderlands) from Warsaw;
- Towarzystwo Miłośników Kultury Kresowej (Association of Friends of Kresy Culture) from Wrocław;
- Towarzystwo Miłośników Wołynia i Polesia (Association of Lovers of Wołyn and Polesie) from Warsaw;
- Towarzystwo Miłośników Lwowa i Kresów Południowo-Wschodnich (Association of Lovers of Lwów and Southeastern Kresy) from Wrocław, with branches in Brzeg, Bydgoszcz, Bytom, Chełm, Gdańsk, Jelenia Góra, Kłodzko, Kraków, Leszno, Lublin, Poznań, Szczecinek, Świdwin, Warszawa, Węgliniec and Zabrze;
- Towarzystwo Przyjaciół Grodna i Wilna (Association of Friends of Grodno and Wilno), with branches in Białystok, Ełk, Gdańsk, Giżycko, Lublin, Łódź, Ostrołęka, Stargard Szczeciński, Warszawa, Węgorzewo, Wrocław;
- Związek Sybiraków (Association of Sybiraks) from Warsaw, with branches scattered across Poland and abroad.

Every year, in the Masurian town of Mrągowo, there is a Festiwal Kultury Kresowej (Festival of Kresy Culture), sponsored among others by the Senate of the Republic of Poland and the Minister of Culture, with the patronage of the First Lady. The Festival is broadcast by TVP2 and TVP Polonia, and in 2011 it was organized for the 17th time. Among participants of the 2011 Festival, there were such artists, as Folk Ensemble Mozyrzanka from Mozyr, Children and Youth Band Tęcza from Minsk, Folk Band Kresowianka from Ivyanets, Polish Academic Choir Zgoda from Brest, Instrumental Band Biedronki from Minsk, Vocal Duo Wspólna wędrówka from Minsk, Children's Polonia Ensemble Dolinianka from Stara Huta (Ukraine), Ensemble Fujareczka from Sambir, Ensemble Boryslawiacy from Boryslav, Ensemble Niebo do Wynajecia from Stralhivci (Ukraine), Polish Dance and Song Ensemble Wilenka from Vilnius, Dance and Song Band Troczenie from Trakai, Band Wesołe Wilno from Vilnius, Song and Dance Ensemble Kotwica from Kaunas, and Folk and Polish Folklore Dance and Song Ensemble Syberyjski Krakowiak from Abakan in Siberia.

Other notable Kresy-oriented festivals are:

- Dzień Kresowiaka (Kresy Inhabitant Day) in the village of Łagiewniki near Malbork,
- Dzień Kresowy (Kresy Day) in Wschowa,
- Dzień Kultury Kresowej (Day of Kresy Culture) in Kędzierzyn-Koźle,
- Dni Kultury Kresowej (Days of Kresy Culture) in Białystok,
- Dni Kultury Kresowej (Days of Kresy Culture) in Brzeg,
- Dni Kultury Kresowej (Days of Kresy Culture) in Prochowice,
- Kaziuki (Kaziuko mugė), an annual folk arts and crafts fair, which takes place in Vilnius, is organized in several Polish cities (Gdańsk, Olsztyn, Poznań, Suwałki, Warsaw), on the initiative of Poles resettled from Vilnius,
- Kresowy Festiwal Polonijny Młodzieży Szkolnej (Kresy Festival of Polonia Schoolchildren) in Zamość,
- Legnickie Dni Kultury Kresowej (Legnica Days of Kresy Culture) in Legnica, Lubin, Jawor, Chojnów,
- Lipcowy Festiwal Kresowy (July Kresy Festival) in Rejowiec,
- Międzynarodowy Festiwal Kultury Kresowej (International Festival of Kresy Culture) in Jarosław,
- Prezentacja Kultury Polaków z Kresów Wschodnich i Bukowiny (Show of Culture of Poles from Eastern Borderlands and Bucovina) in Zielona Góra, Szprotawa, Nowa Sól, Kożuchów, Żagań
- Świdnicki Dzień Kultury Kresowej i Lwowa (Świdnica Day of Kresy and Lwów Culture) in Świdnica.

In Lubaczów is a Museum of Kresy, and there is a project, supported by the local government, to create a Museum of Eastern Borderlands in Wrocław, the city where a number of Poles from Kresy settled after World War II. Numerous photo albums and books, depicting cities, towns and landscapes of Kresy are published every year in Poland. In Chełm, there is Kresy Bicycle Marathon, Polish Radio Białystok every week broadcasts Kresy Magazine, dedicated to the history and present times of the Eastern Borderlands. Every Sunday, Polish Radio Katowice broadcasts a program based on the famous prewar Lwów's Merry Wave, every Tuesday, Polish Radio Rzeszów broadcasts a program Kresy Landscapes. In Wrocław, the Association of Remembrance of Victims of Ukrainian Nationalists publishes Na Rubieży (On the Border) magazine. Among the best known Kresy activists of contemporary Poland are Father Tadeusz Isakowicz-Zaleski, and Dr. Tadeusz Kukiz, father of popular singer Paweł Kukiz. Since 2007, annual medals Heritage of Eastern Borderlands have been awarded in Wrocław. The 2011 recipient was emeritus Archbishop of Wrocław, Henryk Gulbinowicz. Participants of annual Katyń Motorcycle Raid (Motocyklowy Rajd Katyński) always visit Polish centers in Kresy, giving presents to children, and meeting local Poles.

The program of the 2011 Days of Kresy Culture (22–23 October) in Brzeg covered such events as: Kresy themed cabaret, promotion of Kresy books, Eastern Borderlands cuisine, mass in a local church, meetings with Kresy activists and scholars, and theatre shows of Brzeg's Garrison Club as well as Lwów Eaglets Middle School number 3 in Brzeg. Organizers of the festival assured that for the two days Brzeg would turn into the "capital of interwar Polish Kresy".

In January, February and March 2012, Centre for Public Opinion Research did a survey, asking Poles about their ties to Kresy. It turned out that almost 15% of the population of Poland (4,3 – 4,6 million people) declared that they either were born in the Kresy, or have a parent or a grandparent from that region. The number of Kresowiacy is high in northern and western Poland – as many as 51% of inhabitants of Lubusz Voivodeship, and 47% of inhabitants of Lower Silesian Voivodeship stated that their family has ties to the Kresy. Furthermore, Kresowiacy now make 30% of the population of Opole Voivodeship, 25% of the population of West Pomeranian Voivodeship, and 18% of the population of Warmian–Masurian Voivodeship.

== Polish regional dialects ==
Since Poles have lived in Kresy for hundreds of years, two groups of Kresy Polish dialects emerged: the northern (dialekt północnokresowy), and the southern (dialekt południowokresowy). Both dialects have been influenced either by Ukrainian, Belarusian or by Lithuanian. To Polish speakers in Poland, Kresy dialects are easy to distinguish, as their pronunciation and intonation are markedly different from standard Polish. Before World War II, the Kresy provinces were part of Poland, and both dialects were in common usage, spoken by millions of ethnic Poles. After the war and Soviet annexation of Kresy, however, the majority of ethnic Poles were deported westward, resulting in a severe decline in the number of native speakers. The northern Kresy dialect is still used along the Lithuanian-Belarusian border, where Poles still live in large numbers, but the southern Kresy dialect is endangered, as Poles in western Ukraine do not form a majority of the population in any district. Particularly notable among the Kresy dialects is the Lwów dialect which emerged early in the 19th century and was spoken in the city gaining much recognition in the 1920s and 1930s, partly due to the countrywide popularity of numerous Kresy-born and trained actors and comedians whose native speech it was (see also: Dialects of the Polish language).

== See also ==
- Kresy dialects:
  - Northern Borderlands dialect
  - Southern Borderlands dialect
- Bug River land
- Lithuanian and Belarusian Self-Defence
- Lwów Eaglets
- Peace of Riga
- Poles in the former Soviet Union
- Polish historical regions
- Polish National-Territorial Region
- Polonia
- Republic of Central Lithuania
- Repatriation of Poles (1955–1959)
- Soviet repressions of Polish citizens (1939–1946)
- Suwałki Agreement
- Territories of Poland annexed by the Soviet Union
- Treaty of Brest-Litovsk
- Treaty of Warsaw (1920)
- Vilnius Region
- Volhynia Experiment
- Wanda Wasilewska
- Western Krai
- West Ukrainian People's Republic
- Zakerzonia
- Żeligowski's Mutiny

== Bibliography ==
- Beauvois, Daniel Trójkąt ukraiński, szlachta, carat i lud na Wołyniu, Podolu i Kijowszczyźnie 1793–1914, University of Maria Curie-Sklodowska, Lublin, 2005, 2011 and 2016 (in Polish)
- Kieniewicz, Stefan (2016). Emancipation of the Polish Peasantry. University of Chicago Press. ISBN 978-0226435244.
- Mały rocznik statystyczny 1939, Central Statistical Office of Poland, Warsaw 1939 (in Polish)
