= Ethnographic group =

Subgroup of an ethnic group

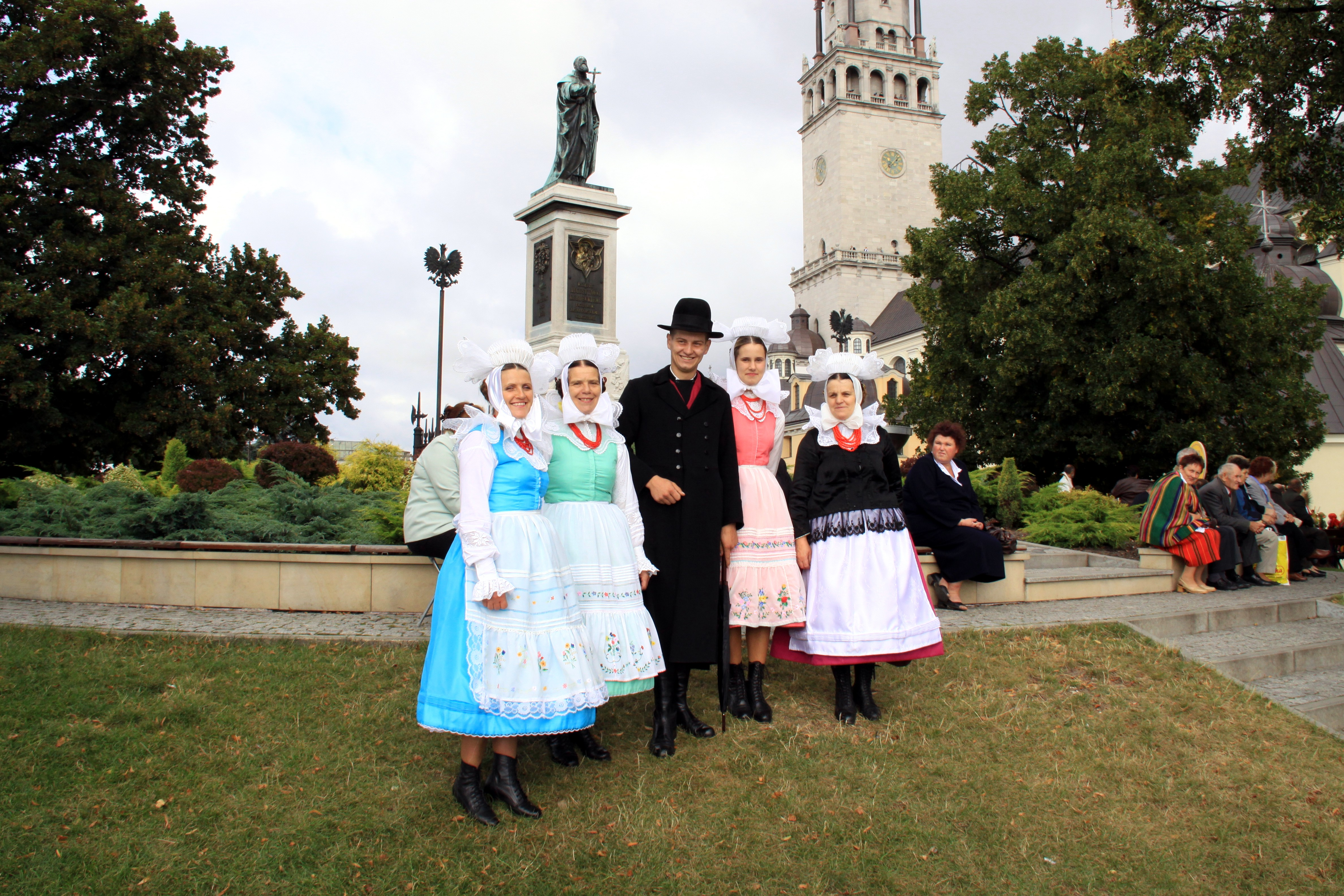
Citizens of Krobia (Greater Poland) wearing local folk costume.

An ethnographic group or ethnocultural group is a group that has cultural traits that make it stand out from the larger ethnic group it is a part of. In other words, members of an ethnographic group will also consider themselves to be members of a larger ethnic group, both sharing a collective consciousness with it, and possessing their own distinct one. Ethnographic groups are presumed to be significantly assimilated with the larger ethnic group they are part of, though they retain distinctive, differentiating characteristics related to cultural values such as speech, religion, costume, or other cultural aspects.

The concept of an ethnographic group is rarely found in Western works, and has been attributed to late 20th-century ethnographic studies in the countries of the former Soviet Union and its Eastern Bloc. This term has been used for example in works of Bulgarian, Georgian, Hungarian and Polish ethnographers.

Paul R. Magocsi, an American historian specializing in Ukrainian studies, described the concept of an ethnographic group as closely related to that of the ethnic group. Some scholars use the term ethnographic group as a synonym for ethnic group. The concept of the ethnographic group as distinct from ethnic group has been rejected by some scholars; and it has been argued that most recent studies do not distinguish between the concepts of ethnographic and ethnic groups.

An example of an ethnographic group division would be dividing the Subcarpathian Rus Rusyns ethnic group into Lemkos, Boikian and Hutsul ethnographic groups. Other groups that have been described by some scholars as ethnographic groups include Pomaks in Bulgaria, Lipka Tatars in Poland, Adjarians and Khevsurians in Georgia, Bavarians in Germany and Feylis in Iraq and Iran.

== See also ==
- Ethnography
- Subculture
