= Northern Borderlands dialect =

Dialect of Polish language

- dialekt północnokresowy
- Native to: Lithuania, Belarus
- Language family: Indo-European: Balto-Slavic; Slavic; West Slavic; Lechitic; Polish; Northern Borderlands dialect
- Writing system: Latin (Polish alphabet)

Language codes
- ISO 639-3: –
- Glottolog: None
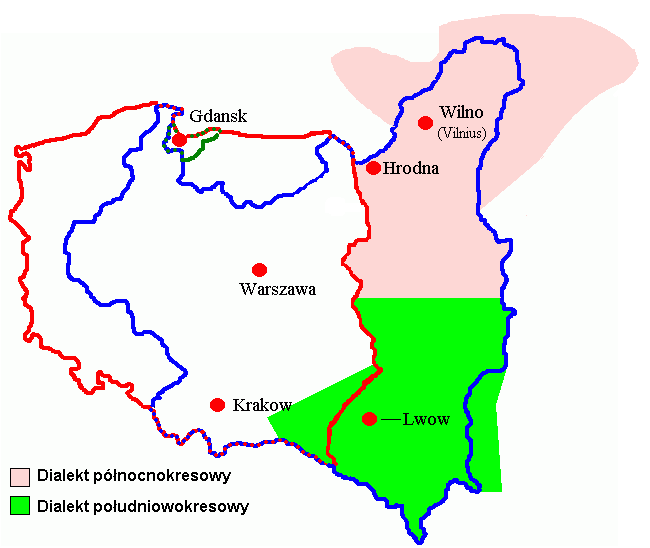
- Map of borders of the Second Polish Republic until 1939, and modern state of Poland, including the area of the reach of the Northern Borderlands dialect.

Northern Borderlands dialect (Note: Polish: dialekt północnokresowy) is a dialect of the Polish language, spoken by the Polish minorities in Lithuania and in northwestern Belarus.

== Phonology ==
The Northern Borderlands dialect retains the same vowel system as standard Polish, however there is often vowel reduction in unstressed syllables. Most of the major differences appear in the realization of consonants. See Polish phonology for more information on allophones.

1. Standard Polish /w/, spelled ⟨ł⟩, is pronounced /ɫ/, and standard /l/ is palatalized, yielding /lʲ/, like in the Southern Borderlands dialect.
2. The standard Polish palatal sibilants and affricates, /ɕ/, /ʑ/, /t͡ɕ/, and /d͡ʑ/ (spelled ⟨ś⟩, ⟨ź⟩, ⟨ć⟩, and ⟨dź⟩ respectively) are pronounced /sʲ/, /zʲ/, /t͡sʲ/, and /d͡zʲ/.

The phoneme charts are as follows:

Oral vowels
	Front	Central	Back
Close	i	ɨ	u
Mid	ɛ		ɔ
Open		a	

Nasal vowels
	Front	Back
Mid	ɛ̃	ɔ̃

		Labial	Dental/ alveolar		Post- alveolar	(Alveolo-) palatal	Velar	
		Labial	plain	palatalized	Post- alveolar	(Alveolo-) palatal	plain	palatalized
Nasal		m	n			ɲ	ŋ	
Plosive	voiceless	p	t				k	kʲ
Plosive	voiced	b	d				ɡ	ɡʲ
Affricate	voiceless		t͡s	t͡sʲ	t͡ʂ			
Affricate	voiced		d͡z	d͡zʲ	d͡ʐ			
Fricative	voiceless	f	s	sʲ	ʂ		x	xʲ
Fricative	voiced	v	z	zʲ	ʐ			
Tap/trill			r					
Approximant			ɫ	lʲ		j		

== Bibliography ==
- Karaś, Halina (2010). Kresowe odmiany polszczyzny [Borderlands variants of Polish] (in Polish). ISBN 978-83-62844-10-4. Archived from the original on March 23, 2023.
