= Southern Borderlands dialect =

Dialect of Polish language

- dialekt południowokresowy
- Native to: Ukraine
- Language family: Indo-European: Balto-Slavic; Slavic; West Slavic; Lechitic; Polish; Lesser Polish; Southern Borderlands dialect
- Writing system: Latin (Polish alphabet)

Language codes
- ISO 639-3: –
- Glottolog: None
- IETF: pl-UA
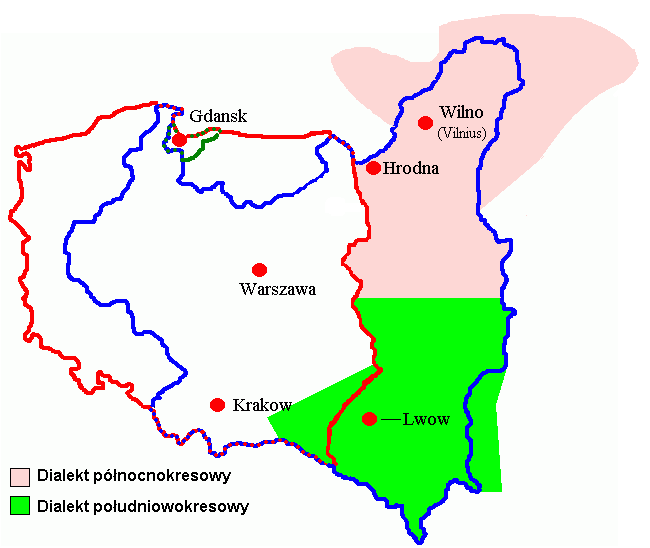
- Map of borders of the Second Polish Republic until 1939, and modern state of Poland, including the area of the reach of the Southern Borderlands dialect.

Southern Borderlands dialect (Note: Polish: dialekt południowokresowy) is a dialect of the Polish language, spoken by the Polish minority in Ukraine. It is considered a branch of the Lesser Poland dialect by Zofia Kurzowa.

== Phonology ==
The main differences in pronunciation lie within the consonant system.

1. Standard Polish /w/, spelled ⟨ł⟩, is pronounced /ɫ/, and standard /l/ is palatalized, yielding /lʲ/, like in the Northern Borderlands dialect.
2. Standard Polish /x/, spelled ⟨h⟩ and ⟨ch⟩, may be palatalized, yielding /xʲ/
3. Standard Polish /k/ and /ɡ/, spelled ⟨k⟩ and ⟨g⟩, may be palatalized, yielding /kʲ/ and /ɡʲ/
4. The standard Polish palatal sibilants and affricates, /ɕ/, /ʑ/, /t͡ɕ/, and /d͡ʑ/ (spelled ⟨ś⟩, ⟨ź⟩, ⟨ć⟩, and ⟨dź⟩ respectively) are pronounced /sʲ/, /zʲ/, /tʲ/, and /dʲ/.

Some speakers speak with an accent according to the pronunciation of Ukrainian cognates.

The phoneme charts are as follows:

Oral vowels
	Front	Central	Back
Close	i	ɨ	u
Mid	ɛ		ɔ
Open		a	

Nasal vowels
	Front	Back
Mid	ɛ̃	ɔ̃

		Labial	Dental/ alveolar		Post- alveolar	(Alveolo-) palatal	Velar	
		Labial	plain	palatalized	Post- alveolar	(Alveolo-) palatal	plain	palatalized
Nasal		m	n			ɲ	ŋ	
Plosive	voiceless	p	t	tʲ			k	kʲ
Plosive	voiced	b	d	dʲ			ɡ	ɡʲ
Affricate	voiceless		t͡s		t͡ʂ			
Affricate	voiced		d͡z		d͡ʐ			
Fricative	voiceless	f	s	sʲ	ʂ		x	xʲ
Fricative	voiced	v	z	zʲ	ʐ			
Tap/trill			r					
Approximant			ɫ	lʲ		j		

== Bibliography ==
- Karaś, Halina (2010). Kresowe odmiany polszczyzny [Borderlands variants of Polish] (in Polish). ISBN 978-83-62844-10-4. Archived from the original on March 23, 2023.
