= List of contemporary ethnic groups of Europe =

List of European ethnic groups

The following is a list of contemporary ethnic groups of Europe. There has been constant debate over the classification of ethnic groups. Membership of an ethnic group tends to be associated with shared ancestry, history, homeland, language or dialect and cultural heritage; where the term "culture" specifically includes aspects such as religion, mythology and ritual, cuisine, dressing (clothing) style and other factors.

By the nature of the concept, ethnic groups tend to be divided into subgroups, may themselves be or not be identified as independent ethnic groups depending on the source consulted.

Europe here is considered to be approximately delimited from North America by the Greenland Sea (extending west to Svalbard, Jan Mayen, and Iceland along the Fram and Denmark straits); from Asia by Thrace at the border between the Istanbul and Kocaeli Provinces, the Sea of Marmara, the Dardanelles, the Greater Caucasus Mountains, the Ural Mountains, the Ural River, the Kara Sea, and the Greek Aegean Islands; and from Africa by the Mediterranean Sea, Strait of Sicily, and Strait of Gibraltar. The Qusar, Quba, Khachmaz, Shabran, Siyazan, Khizi, Absheron, Sumgait, and Baku rayons of Azerbaijan are considered to be primarily north of the Greater Caucasus. This does not fully align with conventional delimitations of Asia and is used primarily as a matter of convenience, as many publications about ethnic groups will only specify locations down to provinces, making more precise delimitation impractical.

== Ethnic groups ==
The following groups are commonly identified as "ethnic groups", as opposed to ethno-linguistic phyla, national groups, racial groups or similar.

Ethnicity	Language(s)	Primary homeland	Subgroups, tribes & castes	Religion(s)
Abazins	Northwest Caucasian → Abkhaz–Abaza → Abaza	Russia (Abazinia)		Islam → Sunnism,Christianity
Afro-Turks	Turkic → Oghuz → Turkish	Turkey		Islam
Aghuls	Northeast Caucasian → Lezgic → Aghul (Note: Language family; with some exceptions, all speakers of the various languages within this family are typically seen as one singular ethnicity.)	Russia (Dagestan)		Islam → Sunnism
Akhvakhs	Northeast Caucasian → Avar–Andic → Akhvakh	Russia (Dagestan)		Islam
Albanians	Indo-European → Albanoid → Albanian; Albanian Sign; Francosign → Austro-Hungarian Sign → Yugoslav Sign	Southeastern Europe	Ghegs (including Arbanasi and Kosovars), Tosks (including Arbereshe, Cham Albanians, Arvanites, Lab Albanians), Albanian tribes, along with significant populations in Eastern Thrace, France, the United Kingdom, Italy, Spain, Germany, the Netherlands, Austria, Belgium, Nordic countries, Switzerland, Greece (including Western Thrace), Ukraine, Romania, Hungary, Croatia, Montenegro, Bosnia and Herzegovina, Serbia, Bulgaria, North Macedonia	Islam → Sunnism, Sufism → Bektashism; Christianity → Catholicism → Latin Catholicism, Albanian Greek Catholic Church, Italo-Albanian Catholic Church; Christianity → Eastern Orthodoxy → Albanian Orthodox Church
Alsatians	Indo-European → Germanic → Alsatian (Note: Due to France's long history of promoting the French language at the expense of others, the vast majority only speak French.); Indo-European → Romance → Frainc-Comtou, Lorrain → Welche	France (Alsace)		Christianity → Catholicism
Andalusians	Indo-European → Romance → Spanish → Andalusian Spanish; Historically Indo-European → Romance → Andalusi Romance; Afroasiatic → West Semitic → Andalusi Arabic	Spain (Andalusia)		Christianity → Catholicism
Andis	Northeast Caucasian → Avar–Andic → Andi	Russia (Dagestan)		Islam
Angevins	Indo-European → Romance → Angevin	France (Anjou)		Christianity → Catholicism
Anglo-Irish	Indo-European → Germanic → English → Hiberno-English; Francosign → Irish Sign; BANZSL → British Sign; BANZSL → British Sign → Northern Ireland Sign	Ireland		Christianity → Protestantism → Anglicanism, Methodism
Aragonese	Indo-European → Romance → Aragonese, Spanish	Spain (Aragon)	Oscenses, Zaragozans, Turolenses	Christianity → Catholicism
Archis	Northeast Caucasian → Lezgic → Archi	Russia (Dagestan)		Islam → Sunnism
Armenians	Indo-European → Armenian; Northwest Caucasian → Circassian; Armenian Sign; Indo-European → Iranian → Persian → Armeno-Tat; Historically Turkic → Kipchak → Armeno-Kipchak	Azerbaijan (Baku), Ukraine (Crimea, Nakhichevan-on-Don), Russia (Kuban, North Caucasus Federal District)	Cherkesogai, Armeno-Tats, Hayhurum, along with significant populations in Russia, Belarus, Bulgaria, Czech Republic, Serbia, Poland, Greece, Hungary, Moldova, Romania, Ukraine (including Crimea), France, Spain, the United Kingdom, Sweden, Switzerland, Italy, Malta, Austria, Belgium, the Netherlands, Azerbaijan (including Baku) and Germany	Christianity → Oriental Orthodoxy → Armenian Apostolic Orthodoxy; Christianity → Eastern Catholicism → Armenian Catholicism; Christianity → Eastern Protestantism → Armenian Evangelicalism
Aromanians	Indo-European → Romance → Aromanian	Southeastern Europe (Greece, Albania, North Macedonia, Serbia, Bulgaria, Romania) (Note: Non-contiguous homeland. Throughout most of its history (if not its entire history), this ethnic group has lived in separate, isolated communities scattered throughout the countries/subdivisions listed.)	Significant populations in Greece, Albania, Romania, Bulgaria, Serbia, and North Macedonia, along with diaspora populations	Christianity → Eastern Orthodoxy
Arpitans	Indo-European → Romance → Franco-Provençal; Indo-European → Romance → Neapolitan; Indo-European → Romance → Italian	Arpitania (France, Switzerland, Italy), Italy (Celle di San Vito, Faeto)	Dauphinese, Valdôtains, Daunia Arpitans (including Cellese and Faetani), Forezians, Arpitan-speaking Romands, Savoyards	Christianity → Catholicism
Ashkali and Balkan Egyptians	Indo-European → Albanoid → Albanian	Southeastern Europe (Kosovo, Serbia, Montenegro, Albania, North Macedonia, Croatia)		Islam → Sunnism,Christianity
Asturians	Indo-European → Romance → Asturleonese → Asturian; Indo-European → Romance → Galician and Asturleonese → Eonavian (Note: Eonavian is variously classified as a dialect group of Galician, a transitional variety between Galician and Asturian, and as a separate linguistic group.); Indo-European → Romance → Spanish → Castrapo	Spain (Asturias)	Eonavians	Christianity → Catholicism
Austrians	Indo-European → Germanic → Bavarian, German → Austrian German	Austria		Christianity → Catholicism
Avars	Northeast Caucasian → Avar–Andic → Avar	Russia (Dagestan, Chechnya, Kalmykia)		Islam → Sunnism,Christianity
Azerbaijanis	Turkic → Oghuz → Azeri; Francosign → RSLic → Russian Sign → Azerbaijani Sign	Russia (Dagestan), Azerbaijan (Qusar, Quba, Khachmaz, Shabran, Siyazan, Khizi, Absheron, Sumgait, and Baku rayons)	Dagestani Azerbaijanis, along with significant populations in Russia, Ukraine, Belarus, France, Germany, the United Kingdom	Islam → Shi'ism
Bagvalals	Northeast Caucasian → Avar–Andic → Bagvalal	Russia (Dagestan)		Islam → Sunnism
Balkars	Turkic → Kipchak → Karachay–Balkar → Balkar	Russia (Kabardino-Balkaria)		Islam → Sunnism
Barranquenhos	Indo-European → Romance → Barranquenho	Portugal (Barrancos)		
Bashkirs	Turkic → Kipchak → Bashkir	Russia (Badzhgard, Tatarstan, Perm Krai, Orenburg)	Northeastern (Aile, Badrak, Bikatin, Bishul, Duvan, Kalmak, Katai, Kossy, Kuvakan, Kudey, Kumruk, Murzy, Salyut, Syzgy, Synryan, Syrzy, Tabyn, Tersyak, Upey), Northwestern (Baylar, Balyksy, Bulyar, Gaina, Gere, Duvaney, Elan, Adyak, Adey, Irekte, Kanly, Karshin, Kirghiz, Taz, Tanyp, Uvanysh, Un, Uran, Jurmi), Southeastern (Burzyan, Kypsak, Tamyan, Tangaur, Usergan, Jurmaty), Southwestern (Ming)	Islam → Sunnism
Basques	Aquitanian → Basque (Note: Due to the widespread presence of both Spanish and French, the majority of Basques only have a passive knowledge of their language.)	Basque Country (Spain, France)	Navarreans, Alavans, Biscayans, Gipuzkoans, Northern Basques	Christianity → Catholicism
Belarusians	Indo-European → Slavic → Belarusian (Note: Unlike the rest of the Soviet republics, who were able to maintain their native language despite the de facto Russification during the Soviet era, the Russian language has largely replaced Belarusian in everyday use.)	Belarus, Lithuania (Vilnius Region), Polesia (Poland, Ukraine), Russia (Smolensk Oblast, Pskov Oblast, Bryansk Oblast, Kaluga Oblast, Oryol Oblast), and neighboring regions	Significant populations in Poland, Lithuania, Russia, Ukraine, and Russia	Christianity → Eastern Orthodoxy → Belarusian Orthodoxy; Christianity → Eastern Catholicism → Belarusian Greek Catholicism
Berrichons	Indo-European → Romance → Berrichon; Francosign → French Sign	France (Berry)		Christianity → Catholicism
Bezhta	Northeast Caucasian → Tsezic → Bezhta	Russia (Tsuntinsky District)		Islam → Sunnism
Bosniaks	Indo-European → Slavic → Shtokavian → Bosnian; Francosign → Austro-Hungarian Sign → Yugoslav Sign → Bosnian Sign	Bosnia and Herzegovina, Sandžak (Serbia, Montenegro), and neighboring regions	Significant populations in Serbia, Montenegro, Croatia, Albania, Kosovo, Slovenia, North Macedonia, East Thrace, Sweden, Austria, Germany	Islam → Sunnism
Botlikhs	Northeast Caucasian → Avar–Andic → Botlikh	Russia (Dagestan)		Islam → Sunnism
Bretons	Indo-European → Celtic → Breton (Note: Due to a lack of mutual intelligibility with other Breton varieties, the Gwenedeg varieties are considered to be a distinct language from other Breton varieties within a Bretonic language family by the Max Planck Institute for Evolutionary Anthropology within their Glottolog database.); Indo-European → Romance → Gallo; Francosign → French Sign	France (Brittany)		Christianity → Catholicism
Budukhs	Northeast Caucasian → Lezgic → Budukh	Azerbaijan (Buduq)		Islam → Sunni Islam
Bulgarians	Indo-European → Slavic → Bulgarian, Torlakian; Francosign → Bulgarian Sign	Bulgaria, North Macedonia, Serbia, and neighboring regions	Pomaks, Shopi, Paulicians, Macedonian Bulgarians, Bessarabian Bulgarians, Dobrujan Bulgarians, Thracian Bulgarians, Crimean Bulgarians, Karakachani, along with significant populations in East Thrace, Croatia, Germany, Spain, Romania, North Macedonia, Hungary, Serbia, the United Kingdom, Italy, France, Kazakhstan, Ukraine	Christianity → Eastern Orthodoxy
Burgundians	Indo-European → Romance → Burgundian	France (Burgundy)		Christianity → Catholicism
Camminanti	Indo-European → Romance → Baccagghiu	Italy (Sicily)		Christianity
Cantabrians	Indo-European → Romance → Cantabrian, Spanish	Spain (Cantabria)		Christianity → Catholicism
Catalans	Indo-European → Romance → Catalan; LSCic → Catalan Sign	Catalan Countries (Spain, France, Andorra, Italy)	Andorrans, Balears, Algherese, Franjolins, Roussillonese	Christianity → Catholicism
Castilians	Indo-European → Romance → Spanish → Castilian; Spanish Sign	Spain (Castile)		Christianity → Catholicism
Chamalals	Northeast Caucasian → Avar–Andic → Chamalal	Russia (Tsumadinsky District)		Islam → Sunnism; Animism
Champenese	Indo-European → Romance → Champenese; Francosign → French Sign	France (Champagne)		Christianity → Catholicism
Channel Islanders	Indo-European → Romance → Norman → Anglo-Norman; Indo-European → Germanic → English → Channel Island English; BANZSL → British Sign	British Crown Dependencies (Channel Islands)	Jèrriese (including Sarkese), Guernésiese, Auregnese	Christianity
Chechens	Northeast Caucasian → Nakh → Chechen	Russia (Chechnya, Aukh, Orstkhoy-Mokhk)	Kists, Chechen Kurds, Aukhs (including Veappiis), Orstkhoys, Terloys, Shatoys, Ghendargnoys, Zandkhoys, Chinkhoys, other teips with significant populations in Austria, France	Islam → Sunnism; Historically Vainakh religion
Chuvash	Turkic → Oghur → Chuvash	Russia (Chuvashia)	Virjal, Anatri	Christianity → Eastern Orthodoxy → Russian Orthodoxy; Vattisen Yaly
Cimbrians	Indo-European → Germanic → Cimbrian	Italy (Sette Comuni, Luserna, Thirteen Communities)		Christianity → Catholicism
Circassians	Northwest Caucasian → Circassian; Historically Northwest Caucasian → Ubykh, Chakobsa	Russia (Circassia) (Note: Following the Caucasian War, the majority of Circassians and Abkhazians were deported to Turkey.)	Abzakhs, Adygeans, Besleneys, Bzhedugs, Chemirgoys, Cherkess, Kabardians, Natukhajs, Shapsugs, Ubykhs, Makhosh, Yegeruqways and Hatuqays, with significant populations in East Thrace, Germany, Bulgaria	Islam → Sunnism → Hanafism, Sufism → Naqshbandism,Eastern Orthodox Christianity
Cornish	Indo-European → Celtic → Cornish (Note: Due to a long history of English dominance within Great Britain, the Celtic languages within the islands have seen steady decline in use, with some of them eventually going extinct. Although all of them have since seen major language revival movements, English continues to be main language for the majority of this group.); Indo-European → Germanic → English → Cornish English; BANZSL → British Sign	United Kingdom (Cornwall)		Christianity → Protestantism → Anglicanism, Methodism
Corsicans	Indo-European → Romance → Corsican	France (Corsica)		Christianity → Catholicism
Cossacks	Indo-European → Slavic → Russian, Ukrainian, Balachka	Russia (Southern Russia), Ukraine (Eastern Ukraine), and neighboring regions	Terek Cossacks, Don Cossacks, Kuban Cossacks, Ural Cossacks, Astrakhan Cossacks	Christianity → Eastern Orthodoxy
Crimean Tatars	Turkic → Kipchak → Middle Crimean Tatar, Northern Crimean Tatar, Dobrujan Tatar; Turkic → Oghuz → Balkan Gagauz → Southern Crimean Tatar; Indo-European → Indo-Aryan → Balkan Romani → Crimean Romani	Ukraine (Crimea)	Steppe, Mountain, and Southcoast tribes, Crimean Roma (including Urmacheli, Krimurja, Tayfa), along with Significant populations in Romania	Islam → Sunnism
Croats	Indo-European → Slavic → Serbo-Croatian (Note: Shtokavian, Chakavian, Kajkavian, Torlakian, Burgenland Croatian, and Slavomolisano are often considered separate languages depending on classification, but Serbian, Croatian, Bosnian, and Montenegrin are typically considered Shtokavian varieties rather than distinct languages due to high degrees of mutual intelligibility.); Francosign → Austro-Hungarian Sign → Yugoslav Sign	Croatia, Bosnia and Herzegovina (Federation of Bosnia and Herzegovina), Kosovo, Austria (Burgenland), and neighboring regions Italy (Campobasso)	Bunjevci, Krashovani, Janjevci, Šokci, Bosnian and Herzegovinian Croats, Montenegrin Croats, Serbian Croats, Slovenian Croats, Burgenland Croats, Croat Muslims, along with significant populations in Italy (including Molise Croats), the Czech Republic, Germany	Christianity → Catholicism
Czechs	Indo-European → Slavic → Czech; Francosign → Austro-Hungarian Sign → Czech Sign	Czech Republic and neighboring regions	Bohemians, Chodové, Chods, Podlužáci, along with significant populations in Ukraine, the United Kingdom, Croatia, Romania, Bulgaria, Austria, France, Poland, Serbia	Christianity → Catholicism → Latin Catholicism (Note: Largest practiced religion; the majority/plurality of this group are actually non-religious.)
Danes	Indo-European → Germanic → Danish; Francosign? → DTSic → Danish Sign	Danish Realm (Denmark), Germany (Southern Schleswig)	Southern Schleswig Danes	Christianity → Protestantism → Lutheranism
Dargins	Northeast Caucasian → Dargin	Russia (Dagestan)	Kaitags, Southern Dargins (including Kubachis and Itsaris), Chirags, Mehwebs, Tsudaqars, Northern Dargins (including Kadars, Aqushas, and Urakhis)	Islam → Sunnism
Dobrujan Tatars	Turkic → Kipchak → Dobrujan Tatar; Indo-European → Romance → Romanian	Romania (Constanța County)		Islam → Sunnism
Dutch	Indo-European → Germanic → Low Franconian, Dutch Low Saxon; Francosign → Dutch Sign	Netherlands	Northern Dutch (including Hollanders, Zeelanders), Southern Dutch (Note: The Flemings and Dutch, particularly Southern Dutch, have many cultural and linguistic characteristics in common, but due to a combination of religious differences and popular stereotypes within the Netherlands and Flanders based on the cultural extremes of the Northern and Southern Dutch regions, most Flemings will not consider themselves ethnically Dutch and vice versa.) (including Dutch Limburgers, North Brabantians, Kleverlanders)	Christianity → Protestantism → Calvinism; Christianity → Catholicism → Latin Catholicism
English	Indo-European → Germanic → English → England English (Note: Northern English dialects are, through their descent from Northumbrian Old English, more closely related to Scots than to other English dialects.); BANZSL → British Sign	United Kingdom (England)	New Forest commoners, Vectensians, Berwickers, Northern English, Moonrakers, Yorkshiremen	Christianity → Protestantism → Anglicanism
Erzyas	Uralic → Mordvinic → Erzya	Russia (Mordovia)	Shokshas	Christianity → Russian Orthodoxy, Protestantism → Lutheranism; Erzyan native religion
Estonians	Uralic → Finnic → Estonian; Francosign → RSLic → Estonian Sign	Estonia, Setomaa (Estonia and Russia), Latvia (Ludza, Gauja)	Setos, Võros, Hiiumaans, Saaremaans, Mulgis, Ludza Estonians, Gauja Estonians, Tartu Estonians, with significant populations in Finland, Ukraine, the United Kingdom, Abkhazia	
Extremadurans	Indo-European → Romance → Extremaduran, Fala, Spanish	Spain (Extremadura)		Christianity → Catholicism
Faroe Islanders	Indo-European → Germanic → Faroese, Danish → Gøtudanskt; Francosign → DTSic → Danish Sign Language → Faroese Sign Language	Danish Realm (Faroe Islands)		Christianity → Protestantism → Lutheranism
Finns	Uralic → Finnic → Finnish; Indo-European → Germanic → Finland Swedish; SSLic → FSLic	Fennoscandia (Finland, Russia, Sweden, Norway)	Forest Finns, Ingrian Finns, Savonians, Tavastians, Finns proper, Ostrobothnians, Peräpohjalaiset, Finnish Karelians, Finland Swedes, Kainuu, and Murmansk Finns, along with significant populations in Sweden, Switzerland	Christianity → Protestantism → Lutheranism
Flemings	Indo-European → Germanic → Zeelandic, West Flemish, Dutch → Flemish; Francosign → Belgian Sign → Flemish Sign	Belgium (Flanders, Brussels), France (French Flanders), Netherlands (Zeelandic Flanders)	Belgian Flemings, Zeelandic Flemings, French Flemings	
Francs-Comtois	Indo-European → Romance → Frainc-Comtou	France (Franche-Comte)		Christianity → Catholicism
Frisians	Indo-European → Germanic → Frisian, Friso-Saxon, Dutch → West Frisian Dutch; Indo-European → Germanic → Dutch and West Lauwers Frisian → Stadsfries Dutch	Frisia (Netherlands, Germany)	West Frisians (including West Lauwers Frisians, Hindeloopen Frisians, Molkwerum Frisians, Schiermonnikoog Frisians, and Terschelling Frisians), East Frisians, North Frisians, Saterland Frisians	Christianity → Protestantism → Calvinism, Lutheranism
Friulians	Indo-European → Romance → Friulian	Italy (Friuli)		Christianity → Catholicism
Gagauz	Turkic → Oghuz → Gagauz	Moldova (Gagauzia, Taraclia, Basarabeasca), Ukraine (Budjak)		Christianity → Eastern Orthodoxy
Gajal	Turkic → Oghuz → Turkish, Balkan Turkish; Indo-European → Slavic → Bulgarian	Bulgaria (Ludogorie), Turkey (East Thrace)		Islam → Sunni Islam
Galicians	Indo-European → Romance → Galician, Spanish → Castrapo	Spain (Galicia, Galicia irredenta)	Couto Mixtans	Christianity → Catholicism
Georgians	Kartvelian languages	Poland (Warsaw), Russia (Moscow, Saint Petersburg), Ukraine (Donetsk Oblast, Dnipropetrovsk Oblast)	Adjarians, Gurians, Imeretians, Imerkhevians, Ingiloys, Javakhians, Kakhetians, Khevsurians, Meskhetians, Mingrelians, Mokheves, Mtiuletians, Pshavs, Rachians, Svans, Tushetians.	Christianity → Eastern Orthodoxy → Georgian Orthodoxy
Germans	Indo-European → Germanic → High German, Low German, Limburgish; DGSic → German Sign	Central and Eastern Europe (especially Germany, Austria, Belgium, Switzerland, and neighboring regions)	Black Sea Germans, Crimea Germans, Volga Germans, Transylvania Saxons, Carpathian Germans (including Zipser Germans), Bavarians, Palatines, Gottscheers, Silesian Germans, Swabians (including Satu Mare Swabians), Danube Swabians (including Banat Swabians), Sudeten Germans, Baltic Germans, Liège Germans, North Schleswig Germans, Olomouc Germans, Bukovina Germans, Halcnovians, German-speaking Swiss, Austrians (including South Tyroleans)	Christianity
German-Speaking Swiss	Indo-European → Germanic → German → Swiss German	Switzerland (German-speaking Switzerland)		Christianity → Protestantism → Calvinism; Christianity → Catholicism → Latin Catholicism
Gibraltarians	Indo-European → Romance → Spanish → Llanito; Indo-European → Germanic → English → Gibraltarian English; BANZSL → British Sign	British Overseas Territories (Gibraltar)	Significant populations in the United Kingdom	Christianity → Catholicism
Gorals	Indo-European → Slavic → Polish → Gorolski; Indo-European → Slavic → Silesian → Cieszyn Silesian	Southern Poland, northern Slovakia, Cieszyn Silesia (Poland, Czech Republic)	Żywiec Gorals, Silesian Gorals	Christianity → Catholicism, Protestantism → Lutheranism
Gorani	Indo-European → Slavic → Torlakian → Gorani	Gora (Kosovo, Albania, North Macedonia)		Islam → Sunni Islam
Greeks	Indo-European → Hellenic; Turkic → Kipchak → Urum; Indo-European → Romance → Aromanian, Megleno-Romanian; Indo-European → Albanian → Arvanitika; Indo-European → Slavic → Macedo-Bulgarian; Francosign → French Sign and American Sign → Greek Sign; Historically Turkic → Oghuz → Turkish → Karamanli Turkish	Greece, Albania (Northern Epirus), Ukraine (Crimea, Pryazovia), Turkey (Istanbul), Italy (Magna Graecia), Bulgaria (Balkan Mountains, Rila, Northeastern Bulgaria), North Macedonia, Russia (North Caucasus), and neighboring regions	Marides, Asia Minor Greeks (including Pontic Greeks, Cappadocian Greeks (including Karamanlides), Constantinopolites), Greek Muslims (including Vallahades), Sarakatsani (including Karakachani), Souliotes, Azov Greeks (including Mariupol Greeks, Crimean Urums), Italiots (including Grikos and Grecanici), Macedonian Greeks, Tsakonians, Maniots, Karagounides, Phanariots, Caucasus Greeks, Sfakians, Slavophone Greeks, Corfiot Greeks, and sizeable populations of Arvanites, Aromanians and Megleno-Romanians who identify as ethnic Greeks, along with significant populations in Albania (including Northern Epirotes (including Himariotes)), Eastern Thrace, Ukraine, the United Kingdom, Germany, France, Italy, Malta	Christianity → Eastern Orthodoxy, Catholicism → Greek Byzantine Catholicism, historically Hellenism, Neoplatonism, Greco-Roman Mysteries
Hinukh	Northeast Caucasian → Tsezic → Hinuq	Russia (Tsuntinsky and Kizlyarsky districts)		Islam → Sunni Islam
Huguenots	Indo-European → Romance → French	France, United Kingdom, the Netherlands, Scandinavia, Switzerland, Germany,	Camisards	Christianity → Protestantism → Calvinism
Hungarians	Uralic → Hungarian; Francosign → Austro-Hungarian Sign → Hungarian Sign; Historically Indo-European → Iranic → Jassic; Turkic → Kipchak → Cuman	Hungary, Romania (Székely Land, Csángó Land, Bukovina), and neighboring regions	Palóc, Matyó, Hungarian Cumans, Jasz, along with significant populations in Romania (including Székelys (including Bukovina Székelys) and Csángós), Slovakia, Serbia, Ukraine, Croatia, Slovenia, Austria, Germany	Christianity → Catholicism, Hungarian Unitarianism, Eastern Catholicism → Hungarian Greek Catholicism
Hunzibs	Northeast Caucasian → Tsezic → Hunzib	Russia (Tsuntinsky District)		Islam → Sunni Islam
Icelanders	Indo-European → Germanic → Icelandic; Francosign → DTSic → Icelandic Sign	Iceland		Christianity → Protestantism → Lutheranism, Asartu
Ingushes	Northeast Caucasian → Nakh → Ingush, Chechen → Orstkhoy	Russia (Ingushetia, Orstkhoy-Mokhk, Ossetian Prigorodny, Vladikavkaz)	Orstkhoys, Dzherakhs, Sholkhis, Feappiis, Khamkhins, Tsorins, Galashians, Nazranians, other shahars	Islam → Sunni Islam → Shafi'i; Historically Vainakh religion
Irish	Indo-European → Celtic → Irish; Indo-European → Germanic → English → Hiberno-English; Francosign → Irish Sign; BANZSL → British Sign → Northern Ireland Sign; Historically Indo-European → Germanic → Irish Middle English → Yola, Fingallian	Ireland	Irish Catholics, Forth and Bargy people, significant populations in United Kingdom (including Ulster Scots people), Mainland Europe	Christianity → Catholicism and Protestantism
Irish Travellers	Indo-European → Irish and English → Shelta; Francosign → Irish Sign	Ireland	Significant populations in the United Kingdom	Christianity → Catholicism
Istro-Romanians	Indo-European → Romance → Istro-Romanian	Croatia (Istria)		Christianity → Catholicism
Italians	Indo-European → Romance → Italo-Dalmatian, Gallo-Italic; Indo-European → Slavic → Slavomolisano; Francosign → LISic → Italian Sign; Historically Indo-European → Romance → Dalmatian	Italy, Switzerland (Italian Grisons, Ticino), France (Nice), San Marino, Vatican City, Croatia (Dalmatia, Croatian Istria), Montenegro (Dalmatia), Slovenia (Slovenian Istria, Slovene Littoral), Greece (Corfu)	Lombards, Lombards of Sicily, Lombards of Basilicata, Emilians, Tuscans, Romagnols (including Sammarinese), Venetians, Piedmontese, Central Italians, Southern Italians, Extreme Southern Italians (including Sicilians (including Pelagian Islanders (including Lampedusans, Linosans), Pantellerians)) Molise Croats, Dalmatian Italians, Istrian Italians, Niçard Italians, Corfiot Italians, Swiss Italians, Ligurians (including Ligurian Gibraltarians, Genoese, Monégasques), with significant populations in the United Kingdom, France, Germany, Romania, Croatia, Crimea, Belgium, Sweden, Gibraltar	Christianity → Catholicism
Izhorians	Uralic → Finnic → Ingrian	Russia (Ingria)		Christianity → Eastern Orthodoxy
Jeks	Northeast Caucasian → Lezgic → Jek; Turkic → Oghuz → Azeri	Azerbaijan (Mount Shahdagh)		Islam → Sunni Islam
Jews	Afroasiatic → West Semitic → Hebrew → Modern Hebrew (Note: Despite the successful revival of the Hebrew language, many Jews continue to speak the various languages that have developed by the diaspora populations, including Yiddish, Ladino, and Judeo-Arabic. In addition, English serves as the lingua franca of Israel.) Jewish languages, (Note: Though many Jewish languages are not genetically related to each other, they are all ethnolects developed by the Jewish diaspora.); DGSic → Israeli Sign	Central Europe, Eastern Europe, Balkans, Italy, Georgia, Azerbaijan, Iberian Peninsula, with minority populations in France, United Kingdom, Turkey and smaller diaspora in Italy, Brazil, Palestine, United States,	Ashkenazi Jews, Constantinopolitan Karaites, Crimean Karaites, Georgian Jews, Krymchaks, Italkim, Mountain Jews, Sephardic Jews	Judaism
Kalmyks	Mongolic → Central Mongolic → Oirat → Kalmyk Oirat	Russia (Kalmykia)	Dörbet Kalmyks (including Greater Dörbets, Lesser Dörbets, Buzava), Torgut Kalmyks, Khoshut Kalmyks, Baatud Kalmyks, Khoid Kalmyks,	Buddhism → Tibetan Buddhism
Karachays	Turkic → Kipchak → Karachay	Russia (Karachay-Cherkessia)		Islam → Sunni Islam
Karatas	Northeast Caucasian → Avar–Andic → Karata	Russia (Dagestan)		Islam → Sunni Islam
Karelians	Uralic → Finnic → Karelian, Ludic, Livvi-Karelian	Karelia (Finland, Russia)	Ludian Karelians, Tver Karelians (including Derzhan Karelians), Livvi Karelians	Christianity → Eastern Orthodoxy
Kashubians	Indo-European → Slavic → Kashubian; Historically Indo-European → Slavic → Slovincian	Poland (Kashubia)	Krubans, Slovincians, and Gochans, along with the Kashubian diaspora	
Kazakhs	Turkic → Kipchak → Kazakh; Francosign → RSLic → Russian Sign → Kazakh Sign	Kazakhstan	Uly juz, Orta juz, Kishi juz, along with significant populations in Russia	Islam → Sunnism
Khinalugs	Northeast Caucasian → Khinalug	Azerbaijan (Khinalug)		Islam → Sunnism
Komi	Uralic → Permic → Komi	Russia (Komi Republic, Perm Krai, Murmansk Oblast, Nenets Autonomous Okrug)	Komi-Zyrians, Komi-Permyaks, Komi-Yazva, Izhma Komi	Christianity → Eastern Orthodoxy
Kumyks	Turkic → Kipchak → Kumyk	Russia (Kumykia)		Islam → Sunni Islam
Kvens	Uralic → Finnic → Finnish → Kven	Norway (Northern Norway)		Christianity → Protestantism → Lutheranism → Laestadianism
Kryts	Northeast Caucasian → Lezgic → Kryts	Azerbaijan (Quba District)		Islam → Sunnism
Ladins	Indo-European → Romance → Ladin	Italy (Ladinia)		Christianity → Catholicism
Laks	Northeast Caucasian → Lak	Russia (Lakia)		Islam → Sunni Islam
Latvians	Indo-European → Baltic → Latvian, Latgalian; Francosign → Russian Sign → Latvian Sign	Latvia, Russia (Zelenogradsky District, Arch-Latvian Selsoviet, Nizhnyaya Bulanka), Lithuania (Klaipėda County), and neighboring regions	Latgalians, Kursenieki, Selonians, Suiti	Christianity → Protestantism → Lutheranism
Leonese	Indo-European → Romance → Leonese, Spanish	Spain (Leon)		Christianity → Catholicism
Lezgins	Northeast Caucasian → Lezgic → Lezgian	Russia (Lezgistan), Azerbaijan (Quba District, Qusar District, Khachmaz District, Baku)		Islam → Sunni Islam
Liechtensteiners	Indo-European → Germanic → Alemannic German; DGSic? → Swiss-German Sign	Liechtenstein		Christianity → Catholicism
Lipka Tatars	Indo-European → Slavic → Belarusian, Polish; Indo-European → Baltic → Lithuanian	Belarus, Poland, Lithuania		Islam → Sunnism
Lithuanians	Indo-European → Baltic → Lithuanian, Lithuanian Sign	Lithuania, Poland (Podlaskie), Russia (Kaliningrad Oblast), and neighboring regions	Samogitians, Aukštaitians, Lietuvninkai, along with significant populations in Poland and the United Kingdom	Christianity → Catholicism
Livonians	Uralic → Finnic → Livonian	Latvia, Estonia		Christianity → Protestantism → Lutheranism
Lorrains	Indo-European → Romance → Lorrain; Indo-European → Germanic → Lorraine Franconian; Indo-European → Romance → French → Lorraine French	France (Lorraine), Belgium (Gaume)		Christianity → Catholicism
Luxembourgers	Indo-European → Germanic → Moselle Franconian → Luxembourgish; DGSic → German Sign	Luxembourg, Belgium (Arelerland), and neighboring regions		Christianity → Catholicism
Macedonians	Indo-European → Slavic → Macedonian; Francosign → Austro-Hungarian Sign → Yugoslav Sign → Macedonian Sign	North Macedonia and neighboring regions	Torbeši, Mijaks, along with significant populations in Germany, Italy, Switzerland and Greece, Bulgaria, Albania, Serbia, Sweden, Croatia, Austria, France, Hungary, Bosnia and Herzegovina, Slovenia, the Czech Republic, Romania, Montenegro, Poland, the United Kingdom	Christianity → Eastern Orthodoxy
Mainiots	Indo-European → Romance → Mayennese, Sarthese	France (Maine)	Mayennese, Sarthese	Christianity → Catholicism
Maltese	Afroasiatic → West Semitic → Maltese	Malta	Gozitans, with significant populations in Greece (including Corfu)	Christianity → Catholicism
Manx	Indo-European → Celtic → Manx; Indo-European → Germanic → English → Manx English	Crown Dependencies (Isle of Man)		Christianity → Protestantism
Maris	Uralic → Mari	Russia (Mari El, Bashkortostan, Tatarstan, Udmurtia, Perm Krai)	Meadow Mari, Hill Mari, Northwestern Mari, Eastern Mari	Christianity → Eastern Orthodoxy, Mari Native Religion
Mennonites	Indo-European → Slavic → Russian; Indo-European → Germanic → German, Dutch, English; Indo-European → Romance → Spanish	Europe	Russian Mennonites, Old Order Mennonites, Old Colony Mennonites, Amish Mennonites (including Beachy Amish (including Old Beachy Amish), Kauffman Amish Mennonites, Egli Amish, Stuckey Amish)	Christianity → Anabaptism → Mennonitism
Mirandese	Indo-European → Romance → Mirandese	Portugal (Terra de Miranda)		Christianity → Catholicism
Mochènos	Indo-European → Germanic → Mòcheno	Italy (Bersntol)		
Mokshas	Uralic → Mordvinic → Moksha	Russia (Mordovia, Tambov Oblast, Penza Oblast, Orenburg Oblast, Bashkortostan, Tatarstan)		Christianity → Russian Orthodox, Protestantism → Lutheranism; Mokshas native religion
Moldovans	Indo-European → Romance → Romanian; Francosign → Austro-Hungarian Sign → Moldova Sign	Moldova	Significant populations in Romania, Ukraine, Russia	Christianity → Eastern Orthodoxy → Romanian Orthodoxy
Montenegrins	Indo-European → Slavic → Shtokavian → Montenegrin; Francosign → Austro-Hungarian Sign → Yugoslav Sign	Montenegro and neighboring regions	Montenegrin tribes, with significant populations in Serbia, Bosnia and Herzegovina, Croatia, Slovenia, Kosovo, Albania, North Macedonia, Germany, Luxembourg	Christianity → Eastern Orthodoxy
Moravians	Indo-European → Slavic → Czech → Moravian	Czech Republic (Moravia)	Moravian Vlachs, Moravian Slovaks	Christianity → Catholicism
Muslimani	Indo-European → Slavic → Serbo-Croatian	Serbia, Montenegro, Croatia, Bosnia and Herzegovina, Slovenia, North Macedonia, and neighboring regions		Islam
Nenets	Uralic → Samoyedic → Nenets	Russia (Nenets Autonomous Okrug)	Forest Nenets, Tundra Nenets	Shamanism, Animism
Nivernese	Indo-European → Romance → Nivernese	France (Nivernais)		Christianity → Catholicism
Nogais	Turkic → Kipchak → Nogai	Russia (North Caucasus)	Ak Nogai, Karagash	Islam → Sunni Islam
Normans	Indo-European → Romance → Norman	France (Normandy)		Christianity → Catholicism
Norwegians	Indo-European → Germanic → Norwegian; Indo-European → Germanic → Dano-Norwegian → Urban East Norwegian, Bokmål, Riksmål; Francosign → DTSic → Norwegian Sign	Norway	Kola Norwegians, Svalbarders, along with Significant populations in Finland, the United Kingdom	Christianity → Protestantism → Lutheranism
Occitans	Indo-European → Romance → Occitan, Gardiol	Occitania (France, Italy, Spain, Monaco) (Note: Occitania, as defined by the modern Occitan linguistic territory, covers most of the current Southern France, the Alpine valleys of the Western Piedmont, in Italy, Val d'Aran in Spain and Monaco an area of approximately 190,000 km2.)	Aranese, Auvergnats, Provençaux, Languedocians (including Aveyronnese), Limousins, Gascons (including Landese, Bigordans, Bearnese), Périgourdins, Dauphinese, Camarguese, Nicese, Guardiota, Monégasque Occitans	Christianity
Orcadians	Indo-European → Germanic → Scots → Orcadian; Indo-European → Germanic → English → Scottish English; BANZSL → British Sign historically Indo-European → Germanic → Norn	United Kingdom (Orkney)		Christianity → Protestantism → Presbyterianism
Orléanese	Indo-European → Romance → Orléanese	France (Orléanais)	Beaucerans	Christianity → Catholicism
Ossetians	Indo-European → Iranian → Ossetian	Ossetia (Russia)	Iron, Digor	Christianity → Eastern Orthodoxy
Percherons	Indo-European → Romance → Percheron	France (Perche)		Christianity → Catholicism
Picards	Indo-European → Romance → Picard	France (Picardy, Artois), Belgium (Hainaut Province)	Artésians	Christianity → Catholicism
Podlashuks	Indo-European → Slavic → Ukrainian or Belarusian → Podlachian	Poland (Podlachia)		Christianity → Eastern Orthodoxy, Catholicism
Poitevins	Indo-European → Romance → Poitevin–Saintongese → Poitevin	France (Poitou)	Vendeans	Christianity → Catholicism
Poles	Indo-European → Slavic → Polish, Belarusian → Simple speech Polish Sign	Poland, Czech Republic (Trans-Olza), Kresy (Ukraine, Belarus, Lithuania), and neighboring regions	Masovians (including Bambers, Kurpies, Łowiczans, Masurians, Międzyrzec Boyars, Poborzans, Podlachians), Greater Polish (including Kaliszans, Kuyavians (including Kuyavian Borowiaks), and Taśtaks), Lesser Polish (including Cracovians, Lasovians, Lublinians, Sącz Lachs, and Sandomierzans), Kociewians, Łęczycans, Pogorzans, Sieradzans, Borderlands Poles (including Bug River Poles), Tuchola Borowians, Kocievians, Dolinians, and Warmians, as well as Significant populations in Germany, Iceland, Sweden, France, the Czech Republic, the United Kingdom, Belarus, Russia, Lithuania, Ukraine, Ireland, and Norway	Christianity → Catholicism
Poleshuks	Indo-European → Slavic → Belarusian or Ukrainian → West Polesian	Polesia (Belarus, Poland, Russia, Ukraine)		Christianity
Pomaks	Indo-European → Slavic → Bulgarian	Bulgaria, Turkey (East Thrace), Greece (Western Thrace)		Islam
Portuguese	Indo-European → Romance → Portuguese; STSic → Portuguese Sign Language	Portugal	Alentejans, Azoreans, Beiroes, Madeirans, Mindericos, Minhotos, Olivenzans, Táligans, Ribatejanos, Transmontanos	Christianity → Catholicism
Qaratays	Turkic → Kipchak → Tatar → Qataray	Russia (Kamsko-Ustyinsky District)		Christianity → Eastern Orthodoxy → Russian Orthodoxy; Christianity → Protestantism → Baptism
Reisende	Indo-European → Germanic → Norwegian	Norway		Christianity
Resians	Indo-European → Slavic → Slovene → Resian	Italy (Resia)		Christianity → Catholicism
Roma	Indo-European → Indo-Aryan → Romani, Para-Romani (Note: Though many Para-Romani languages are not genetically related to each other beyond having a Romani substrate, they are considered to be ethnolects developed by the Romani diaspora.); Indo-European → Romance → Romanian → Boyash	Europe (Note: This ethnic group is largely a nomadic or semi-nomadic one and do not have a particular area to claim as a primary homeland; these countries are listed here due to having a significant population.)	Kalderash, Iberian Cales (including Spanish Cales, Portuguese Cales, Brazilian Cales), Erromintxela, Finnish Kale, Welsh Kale, Vlax Roma, Romanichal (including Scottish Romanichal Travellers), Lowland Scottish Travellers, Burgenland Roma, Sinti (including Manouches), Belaruska Roma, Litovska Roma, Lotfitka Roma, Ruska Roma, Crimean Roma (including Urmacheli, Krimurja, Tayfa), Gurbeti, Xoraxane Roma (including Turkish Roma, Zargari, and Arlije), Romanisal, Bergitka Roma, Polska Roma, Cascarots, Ursari, Romanlar (including Turkish Roma, Sepetçi, Ayjides, Yerli, and Çerge), Wallachian Roma, Servitka Roma, Lovari, Boyash, along with significant populations in Albania, Austria, Belarus, Bosnia and Herzegovina, Bulgaria, Croatia, the Czech Republic, France, Germany, Greece, Hungary, Ireland, Italy, Kosovo, Montenegro, the Netherlands, North Macedonia, Poland, Portugal, Romania, Russia, Serbia, Slovakia, Slovenia, Spain, Eastern Thrace, Ukraine, the United Kingdom	Christianity, Islam
Romands	Indo-European → Romance → Franco-Provençal, Frainc-Comtou, French → Swiss French; Francosign → Swiss-French Sign	Switzerland (Romandy)		Christianity → Catholicism, Protestantism → Calvinism
Romanians	Indo-European → Romance → Romanian; Francosign → Romanian Sign	Romania, Moldova	Northern Dobrujans, Transylvanians, Wallachians (including Oltenians and Muntenians), Moldavians, Bukovinians, along with significant populations in France, Germany, Italy, Spain, Ukraine, the United Kingdom	Christianity → Eastern Orthodoxy
Romansh	Indo-European → Romance → Romansh	Switzerland (Grisons)		Christianity
Russians	Indo-European → Slavic → Russian; Francosign → Russian Sign	Russia, Ukraine (Sumy Oblast), and neighboring regions	Caucasus Russians, Siberians, Cossacks (including Kuban Cossacks and Nekrasov Cossacks), Pomors, Subbotniks, Old Believers (including Kamenschiks, Lipovans, Semeiskie), Karyms, Gurans, Doukhobors, Goryuns, Molokans (including Subbotnik Molokans), Polekhs, Starozhily, along with significant populations in Bulgaria, Belarus, Belgium, Estonia, France, Germany, Kazakhstan, Latvia, Lithuania, Moldova, Ukraine	Christianity → Spiritual Christianity, Eastern Orthodoxy → Russian Orthodoxy, Old Believerism and Old Ritualism; Christianity and Animism → Eastern Orthodoxy and Animism → Pomor Christianity
Rusyns	Indo-European → Slavic → Carpathian Rusyn, Pannonian Rusyn	Transcarpathia (Ukraine, Slovakia, Poland), (Note: The Rusyn identity is mostly limited to those residing outside of Carpathian Ruthenia. Within Carpathian Ruthenia itself (especially in the Ukrainian region), the majority of its residents identify themselves as being Ukrainian.) Pannonian Plain (Croatia, Serbia), Romania (Bukovina, Maramureș), Lemkovyna (Poland, Slovakia)	Pannonian Rusyns, Lemkos, Hutsuls, Boykos, Dolinians, Zamieszańcy, with significant populations in Romania	Christianity → Eastern Catholicism
Rutuls	Northeast Caucasian → Lezgic → Rutul	Russia (Dagestan)		Islam → Sunni Islam
Saintongese	Indo-European → Romance → Poitevin–Saintongese → Saintongese	France (Saintonge, Aunis, Angoumois)	Saintongese proper, Aunisians, Angoumoisins	Christianity → Catholicism, Protestantism
Sámi	Uralic → Sámi; Historically Uralic → Sámi → Akkala Sámi, Kemi Sámi, Kainuu Sámi	Sápmi (Norway, Sweden, Finland, Russia)	Inari Sámi, Kildin Sámi, Lule Sámi, Northern Sámi, Pite Sámi, Skolt Sámi, Southern Sámi, Ter Sámi, Ume Sámi, Akkala Sámi	Christianity → Protestantism → Lutheranism
Sardinians	Indo-European → Romance → Sardinian, Sassarese, Gallurese, Castellanese	Italy (Sardinia)	Logudorese, Campidanese, Sassarese, Gallurese, Castellanese	Christianity → Catholicism
Scots	Indo-European → Germanic → Scots, English → Scottish English; Indo-European → Celtic → Scottish Gaelic; BANZSL → British Sign; Historically Indo-European → Germanic → Norn	United Kingdom (Scotland)	Ulster Scots, Highlanders (including Caithnesians, and Hebrideans), Lowlanders, Berwickers, along with significant populations in Russia, Estonia	Christianity → Protestantism → Presbyterianism
Scottish Highland Travellers	Indo-European → Celtic → Scottish Gaelic → Beurla Reagaird; BANZSL → British Sign	United Kingdom (Scottish Highlands)		Christianity → Catholicism
Serbs	Indo-European → Slavic → Shtokavian → Serbian; Francosign → Austro-Hungarian Sign → Yugoslav Sign → Serbian Sign	Serbia, Bosnia and Herzegovina (Republika Srpska), Montenegro, Croatia, Kosovo, Romania, Hungary, Albania, Bulgaria, Slovenia, North Macedonia	Kosovo Serbs, Montenegrin Serbs, Croatian Serbs, Bosnian Serbs, Macedonian Serbs, Romanian Serbs, Hungarian Serbs, Albanian Serbs, Bulgarian Serbs, Slovenian Serbs, Vojvodinian Serbs, Triestine Serbs, Serb Muslims, along with significant populations in Greece, Germany, Austria, France, Slovakia, Ukraine, Belarus, Russia, and Sweden	Christianity → Eastern Orthodoxy
Shetlanders	Indo-European → Germanic → Scots → Shetlandic; Indo-European → Germanic → English → Scottish English; BANZSL → British Sign; Historically Indo-European → Germanic → Norn	United Kingdom (Shetland)		Christianity → Protestantism → Presbyterianism
Shopi	Indo-European → Slavic → Bulgarian	Shopluk (Bulgaria, Serbia, North Macedonia)		Christianity → Eastern Orthodoxy
Silesians	Indo-European → Slavic → Silesian; Indo-European → Germanic → Silesian German	Silesia (Poland, Germany, Czech Republic)	Cieszyn Vlachs, Moravian Silesians	Christianity → Catholicism, Protestantism → Lutheranism
Slovaks	Indo-European → Slavic → Slovak; Francosign → Austro-Hungarian Sign → Slovak Sign	Slovakia, Czech Republic, Hungary, Austria, and surrounding regions	Significant populations in Czech Republic, Bulgaria, Hungary, Austria, Serbia, Croatia	Christianity → Catholicism
Slovenes	Indo-European → Slavic → Slovene; Francosign → Austro-Hungarian Sign → Yugoslav Sign → Slovenian Sign	Slovenia, Austria (Carinthia), Hungary, Italy (Friuli-Venezia Giulia), Croatia (Istria, Primorje-Gorski Kotar County, Zagreb), and surrounding regions	Hungarian Slovenes (including Rába Slovenes), Carinthian Slovenes, Prekmurje Slovenes, Italian Slovenes, Croatian Slovenes along with significant populations in the Croatia, and Italy	Christianity → Catholicism
Solognots	Indo-European → Romance → Solognot	France (Sologne)		Christianity → Catholicism
Sorbs	Indo-European → Slavic → Sorbian	Lusatia (Germany, Poland)	Upper Sorbs, Lower Sorbs	Christianity → Catholicism
South Tyroleans	Indo-European → Germanic → Bavarian → South Tyrolean	Italy (South Tyrol)		Christianity → Catholicism
Swabians	Indo-European → Germanic → Alemannic German → Swabian German	Germany (Swabia)		Christianity → Catholicism
Swedes	Indo-European → Germanic → Swedish, Dalecarlian, Gutnish, Norrlandic, Jamtska, East Danish → Scanian; SSLic → Swedish Sign	Sweden, Estonia (Aiboland), Finland (Svenskfinland), Ukraine (Gammalsvenskby)	Scanians, Jamtlanders, Gutnish, Dalecarlians, Estonian Swedes, Finland Swedes (including Ålanders), along with significant populations in the United Kingdom, Ukraine	Christianity → Protestantism → Lutheranism
Tats	Indo-European → Iranian → Persian → Muslim Tat	Russia (Dagestan), Azerbaijan (Baku, Absheron District, Quba District, Shabran District, Khizi District, Siyazan District)		Islam → Shi'ism
Timok Vlachs	Indo-European → Romance → Romanian → Banat, Oltenian; Indo-European → Slavic → Shtokavian → Serbian	Serbia (Timok Valley, Belgrade)		Christianity → Eastern Orthodoxy
Torangeux	Indo-European → Romance → Tourangeau	France (Touraine)		Christianity → Catholicism
Torbeši	Indo-European → Slavic → Macedonian	North Macedonia		Islam → Sunni Islam
Tornedalians	Uralic → Finnic → Finnish → Meänkieli	Torne Valley (Sweden, Finland)		Christianity → Protestantism → Lutheranism
Tsakhurs	Northeast Caucasian → Lezgic → Tsakhur	Russia (Rutulsky District)		Islam → Sunnism
Turks	Turkic → Oghuz → Turkish, Rumelian Turkish; Indo-European → Indo-Aryan → Balkan Romani → Rumelian Romani; Turkish Sign	North Caucasus, Eastern Europe, and Southeast Europe	Rumelian Turks (including Gajals, Kosovan Turks, Dodecanese Turks, Western Thracian Turks, Bulgarian Turks (including in Turkey), Dobrujan Turks, Macedonian Turks, Bosnian Turks, Croatia, Serbian Turks, Montenegrin Turks), Yörüks, Amuca, Turkish Roma, along with significant populations in Germany, France, the United Kingdom, the Netherlands, Austria, Belgium, Sweden	Islam → Sunni Islam, Alevism
Tutejszy	Indo-European → Slavic → Polish, East Slavic; Indo-European → Baltic → Eastern Baltic	Poland, Ukraine, Belarus, Lithuania, Latvia		Christianity → Catholicism, Eastern Orthodoxy → Russian Orthodoxy
Udis	Northeast Caucasian → Lezgic → Udi	Russia, Ukraine		Christianity → Oriental Orthodoxy
Udmurts	Uralic → Permic → Udmurt	Russia (Udmurtia)	Besermyan	Christianity → Eastern Orthodoxy
Ukrainians	Indo-European → Slavic → Ukrainian, Surzhyk, Russian; Francosign → Austro-Hungarian Sign → Ukrainian Sign	Ukraine, Transcarpathia (Slovakia, Poland), Belarus (Beresteishchyna), Russia (Sloboda Ukraine, Pink Ukraine, Yellow Ukraine)	Cossacks, Litvins, Pinchuks,Podolyans, along with significant populations in France, Portugal, Kazakhstan, Germany, Italy, the Czech Republic, Hungary, Poland, Lithuania, Russia (including Kuban), Belarus, Slovakia, Moldova, Estonia, Finland, Italy, Serbia, Sweden, the United Kingdom, and Romania	Christianity → Eastern Orthodoxy, Catholicism → Ukrainian Greek Catholicism
Ulster Protestants	Indo-European → Germanic → Scots → Ulster Scots; Indo-European → Germanic → English → Ulster English; BANZSL → British Sign	Ulster (United Kingdom, Republic of Ireland)		Christianity → Protestantism
Valencians	Indo-European → Romance → Catalan → Valencian; LSCic → Valencian Sign	Spain (Valencian Community, Carche)		Christianity → Catholicism
Vaqueiros de alzada	Indo-European → Romance → Asturleonese	Spain (Asturias, Province of Leon)		Christianity and traditional folk religion → Folk Catholicism → Vaqueiro religion
Vepsians	Uralic → Finnic → Veps	Russia (Former Veps National Volost, Vytegorsky, Babayevsky, Podporozhsky, Lodeynopolsky, Tikhvinsky, and Boksitogorsky districts)		Christianity → Eastern Orthodoxy → Russian Orthodoxy
Vilamovians	Indo-European → Germanic → Wymysorys (Note: Due to policies of Polonization implemented after World War II, the majority of Vilamovians can only speak Polish.)	Poland (Wilamowice)		Christianity → Catholicism
Volga Tatars	Turkic → Kipchak → Central Tatar, Mishar Tatar (Note: While they are commonly subsumed into one Volga Tatar language, the central dialects belong to Kipchak-Bulgar while the Mishar dialects may belong to Kipchak-Cuman.)	Russia (Volga Federal District), Finland	Astrakhan Tatars (including Agrizhan Tatars), Mishar Tatars (including Finnish Tatars), Kasimov Tatars, Kazan Tatars, Kryashens, Nagaybaks, Nukrat Tatars, Perm Tatars, Teptyars	Islam → Sunni Islam
Votians	Uralic → Finnic → Votic	Russia (Ingria), Estonia (Ida-Viru), Latvia (Bauska)	Kreevins, Poluverniki, Kukkuzi	Christianity → Eastern Orthodoxy, Christianity → Protestantism → Lutheranism
Walloons	Indo-European → Romance → Walloon, Picard, Lorrain → Gaumais French → Belgian French; Francosign → Belgian Sign → French Belgian Sign	Belgium (Wallonia, adjacent regions of Flanders), France (Nord-Pas-de-Calais, Ardennes), Netherlands (Dutch Limburg), Germany, Luxembourg	Significant populations in the Netherlands, Sweden	Christianity → Catholicism
Walsers	Indo-European → Germanic → Walser German	Switzerland, Liechtenstein, Italy, Austria		
Welsh	Indo-European → Celtic → Welsh; Indo-European → Germanic → English → Welsh English; BANZSL → British Sign	United Kingdom (Wales)		Christianity → Protestantism
Woonwagenbewoner	Indo-European → Germanic → Dutch → Bargoens	Netherlands		Christianity
Yenish	Indo-European → Germanic → Yenish	Germany, Austria, Switzerland, Luxembourg, Belgium, and France		Christianity, Judaism
Yugoslavs	Indo-European → Slavic → Serbo-Croatian, Macedonian, Slovene; Francosign → Austro-Hungarian Sign → Yugoslav Sign	Serbia, Bosnia and Herzegovina, Montenegro, Slovenia, North Macedonia, Croatia	Significant populations in Serbia	Christianity → Eastern Orthodoxy, Catholicism; Islam → Sunni Islam
