= Montenegrins in Luxembourg =

Luxembourger of Montenegrin birth or descent

Montenegrins in Luxembourg Crnogorci u Luksemburgu Црногорци у Луксембургу
- (Luxembourg) (Montenegro)

Total population
- 2,727-10,000 (est.)

Regions with significant populations
- Luxembourg City

Languages
- Luxembourgish, French, German, Montenegrin

Religion
- Montenegrin Orthodoxy, Roman Catholicism, Islam

Related ethnic groups
- Other Montenegrins, Serbs in Luxembourg

Montenegrins in Luxembourg (Luxembourgish: Montenegriner zu Lëtzebuerg) are supported and represented by various associations. They number between 2,700 and 10,000. (Note: Montenegro's Directorate for the Diaspora estimated that 7,000 Montenegrins lived in Luxembourg as of 2018, while official Luxembourgish statistics, which do not take double nationals into account, placed the number at 2,727 as of 2026. When meeting his Montenegrin counterpart in 2023, Chamber of Deputies president Fernand Etgen mentioned "10,000 Luxembourgers with Montenegrin origins".) Montenegrins are the largest ethnic group in Luxembourg from the former Yugoslavia and outside the EU, representing 22.0% of non-EU Europeans living in Luxembourg. Most Montenegrins arrived as refugees during the Yugoslav Wars in the 1990s. Montenegrins are still migrating to Luxembourg and getting naturalized citizens. The majority of Montenegrins in Luxembourg are Muslims.

== Notable people ==
- Edvin Muratović
- Aldin Skenderovic

== See also ==
- Montenegrin diaspora
- Immigration to Luxembourg
- Montenegrins in France
- Montenegrins in Germany
- Montenegrin Argentines
