= Montenegrins in France =

French people of Montenegrin birth or descent

Montenegrins in France Crnogorci u Francuskoj Црногорци у Француској
- (France) (Montenegro)

Total population
- 30,000 (est.)

Regions with significant populations
- Paris, Toulouse, Lyon, Marseille, Nice, Bordeaux

Languages
- French, Montenegrin

Religion
- Montenegrin Orthodox, Roman Catholic, Muslim

Related ethnic groups
- Montenegrins, Montenegrins in Germany, Montenegrins in Italy, Montenegrins in Luxembourg, Montenegrin Argentines, Montenegrins in Brazil, Montenegrins in Belgium, Montenegrins in Spain, Montenegrins in Cyprus

Montenegrins living in France (French: Monténégrins en France) are supported and represented by various associations. The exact number is not known, but it is estimated that 30,000 Montenegrins live in France. Most Montenegrins arrived as refugees during the Yugoslav Wars in the 1990s.

== Notable people ==
- Alexandre Martinović
- Janko Nilović
- Duchess Jutta of Mecklenburg-Strelitz
- Michel Auclair
- Nicholas, Prince of Montenegro
- Princess Nika Yourievitch
- Sara Cakarevic

== See also ==
- France–Montenegro relations
- Montenegrins
- Montenegrins in Germany
- Montenegrin Argentines
- Montenegrins in Luxembourg
