= Signed German =

Manually coded form of German

In Germany, Signed German, known in German as Lautsprachbegleitende Gebärden or Lautbegleitende Gebärden (LBG, "Speech-accompanying signs"), is a manually coded form of German that uses the signs of German Sign Language and is used in Germany. The Swiss-German Sign Language is used in German Switzerland, while Austria and the German-speaking parts of Italy use Austrian Sign Language. Signed German, in contrast to the other signed languages which are used a mother tongue and cultural carriers, is primarily used as a bridge to the German language in education and for simultaneous translation from German, not as a natural form of communication between deaf people.
