= 2020 Dijon riots =

2020 Chechen-North-African clashes in Dijon

- Grésilles, Dijon, where the riots occurred
- Date: 11–17 June 2020 (6 days)
- Location: Dijon, Bourgogne-Franche-Comté, France
- Caused by: A Chechen attacked by North Africans
- Methods: Rioting

Parties
Chechens	French police	North Africans

Number
150-200	Unknown	A few dozen

Casualties
- Injuries: at least 10

The 2020 Dijon riots took place in Dijon, in the French region of Bourgogne-Franche-Comté for four consecutive days.

== Background ==
On June 10, a 16-year-old Chechen boy was assaulted by French-Arab drug dealers from low-income district of Grésilles in Dijon which has a predominant population of North Africans. Members of the Chechen community reportedly posted about the incident on social media and urged people to come to the city in the boy's defense. The incident amplified tensions between the Chechens and North Africans.

== Riots ==
In retaliation of the assault, approximately 150-200 Chechens from France, Belgium, and Germany stormed the neighborhood of Grésilles. The people participating wore hoods to conceal their identity and brandished clubs. They shot in the air, destroyed surveillance cameras, and set garbage bins as well as vehicles on fire. Videos of the individuals were posted on social media, with some videos depicting people walking the street armed with machine guns, baseball bats and metal rods.

These tensions continued throughout the weekend, but on Monday the interior minister ordered police reinforcements to terminate the situation and announced that the government would manage the crisis. There were helicopters, dozens of police vans, and firefighters attempting to deescalate the violence. However, in their attempts to break up the fighting and end the riots, police did not un-holster their guns. The administration approximated that ten individuals had been injured.

== Investigation ==
Dijon prosecutor Eric Mathais issued a statement that investigators were trying to identify the participants.

On the following Thursday, six people were arrested with their connection to the four-day long riots. Two men, one with Russian and one with French citizenship, were charged with criminal association and intent and with gathering to perpetrate violence as well as damage property. The consequences of their crimes could be ten years in jail. The other suspects have similar charges in addition to aggravated assault.

== Response ==
The Head of Chechnya Ramzan Kadyrov expressed support for the Chechen rioters, stating they had decided to take matters into their own hands against the drug dealers, after the French police failed to act against those who assaulted the 16-year-old Chechen boy. His comments were echoed by several Chechen individuals who claimed that the destruction was a good thing. The father of the assaulted teenager, issued a statement asking individuals to stop rioting and for calm within the neighborhood.

French Interior Minister Christophe Castaner defended the police's reaction to the riots claiming that the police had been outnumbered by "a savage horde", while Marine Le Pen, leader of the far-right National Rally party claimed the streets had been thrown into chaos by gangs waging ethnic wars.

Outrage was pointed at French police by local officials due to the lack of firearm use, with some officials claiming that it had allowed ethnic groups to settle anger and disputes on the street. Other French authorities and policing experts have highlighted the response to the riots as instead a textbook showing of police restraint, during a time of high-profile protests against police use of lethal force in both the United States following the murder of George Floyd and in France with the death of Cédric Chouviat.
