= Belgians =

People of Belgium

Belgen (Dutch) Belges (French) Belgier (German)
- Map of the Belgian diaspora in the world

Total population
- c. 11–12 million

Regions with significant populations
- Belgium 11,825,551
- United States: 384,244
- Canada: 190,455
- France: 145,118
- Netherlands: 117,495
- Italy: 46,000
- Spain: 31,796
- Germany: 20,000–50,000
- United Kingdom: 31,000
- Argentina: 25,000
- Luxembourg: 22,000
- Switzerland: 17,000
- Australia: 14,189
- Turkey: 12,000
- South Africa: 10,000
- Poland: 7,000
- Portugal: 6,088
- Brazil: 6,000
- Israel: 6,000
- Romania: 5,000
- Greece: 5,000
- Bulgaria: 3,000
- Austria: 3,000
- Hungary: 3,000
- Sweden: 3,000
- Denmark: 2,065
- Norway: 2,000
- Ireland: 2,000
- Morocco: 2,000
- South Korea: 1,252
- Japan: 1,050
- Mexico: 1,000
- Slovakia: 1,000
- Malta: 1,000
- Czech Republic: 1,000
- Colombia: 1,000
- DR Congo: 2,746

Languages
- Dutch, French, German (also other languages of Belgium)

Religion
- Predominantly Roman Catholicism and irreligious

Related ethnic groups
- French, Dutch, Luxembourgers and Germans

Belgians (Dutch: Belgen [ˈbɛlɣə(n)]; French: Belges [bɛlʒ]; German: Belgier [ˈbɛlɡi̯ɐ]) are people identified with the Kingdom of Belgium, a federal state in Western Europe. As Belgium is a multiethnic and multilingual state, this connection may be residential, legal, historical, or cultural rather than ethnic.

The majority of Belgians belong to two distinct ethnolinguistic groups or communities (Dutch: gemeenschap; French: communauté) native to the country, i.e. its historical regions: Flemings in Flanders, who speak Dutch; and Walloons in Wallonia, who speak French.

There is also a Belgian diaspora, which has settled primarily in the United States, Canada, France, and the Netherlands.

== Etymology ==
The 1830 revolution led to the establishment of an independent country under a provisional government and a national congress. The name "Belgium" was adopted for the country, the word being derived from Gallia Belgica, a Roman province in the northernmost part of Gaul that, before Roman invasion in 100 BC, was inhabited by the Belgae, a mix of Celtic and Germanic peoples.

The Latin name was revived in 1790 by the short-lived United Belgian States which was created after a revolution against Austrian rule took place in 1789. Since no adjective equivalent to "Belgian" existed at the time, the French noun "Belgique" (or "Belgium") was adopted as both noun and adjective; a phenomenon borrowed from Latin which was still commonly used during the period. From the sixteenth century, the Low Countries" or "Netherlands", were referred to as 'Belgica' in Latin, as was the Dutch Republic.

== Relations between Belgian linguistic communities ==
Belgians are primarily a nationality or citizen group, by jus soli (Latin: right of the soil), also known as birthright citizenship, and are not a homogeneous ethnic group. Belgians are made up of two main linguistic and ethnic groups; the Dutch-speakers (called the Flemish) and the French-speakers (mostly Walloons), as well as a third tiny but constitutionally recognized group from two small German-speaking areas. These sometimes competing ethnic and linguistic priorities are governed by constitutionally designated "regions or communities", depending on the constitutional realm of the topic, a complex and uniquely Belgian political construct. Since many Belgians are at least bilingual, or even trilingual, it is common for business, social and family networks to include members of the various ethnic groups composing Belgium.

The Brussels-Capital Region occupies a unique political and cultural position since geographically and linguistically it is a bilingual enclave within the unilingual Flemish Region. Since the founding of the Kingdom of Belgium in 1830, the city of Brussels was francized, as it was transformed from an almost entirely Dutch-speaking into a multilingual city with French as the majority language and lingua franca.

Since the independence of Belgium in 1830, the constitutional title of the Belgian head of state is the "King of the Belgians" rather than the "King of Belgium".

=== Flemish (Dutch-speaking) ===
Within Belgium the Flemish, about 60% of the population, form a clearly distinguishable group, set apart by their language and customs. Belgian Dutch as spoken in Flanders is generally identical with the Dutch language spoken in the adjacent Netherlands, though there are differences in dialect and accent. Although they share a language and some customs with the Dutch people, Flemings seldom identify themselves as Dutch. Besides their different nationality, they are divided by religious tradition. Most Flemish Christians belong to the Catholic Church, while most Dutch Christians are Protestant.

=== Walloon (French-speaking) ===
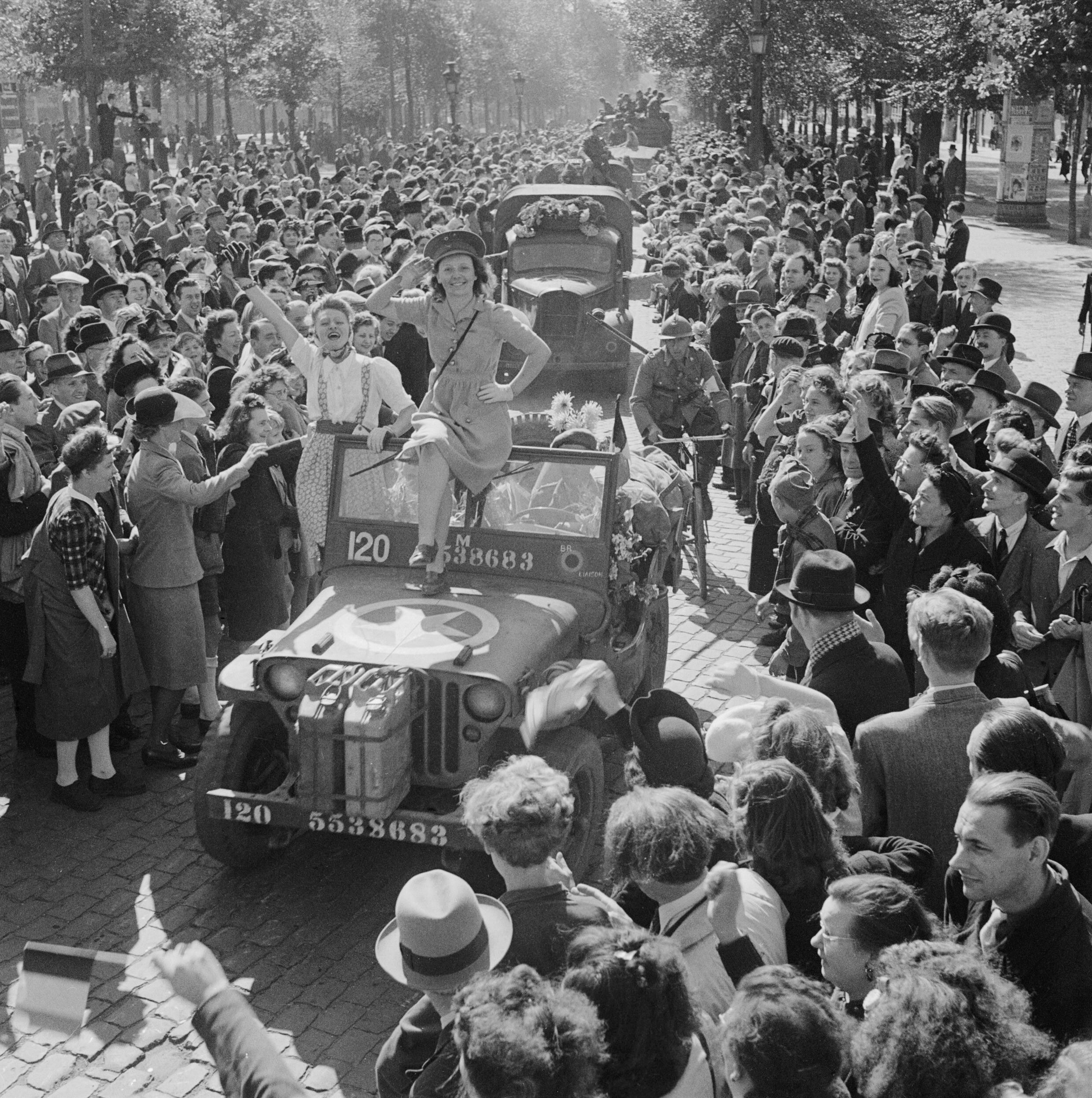
Cheering crowds greet British troops entering Brussels, 1944

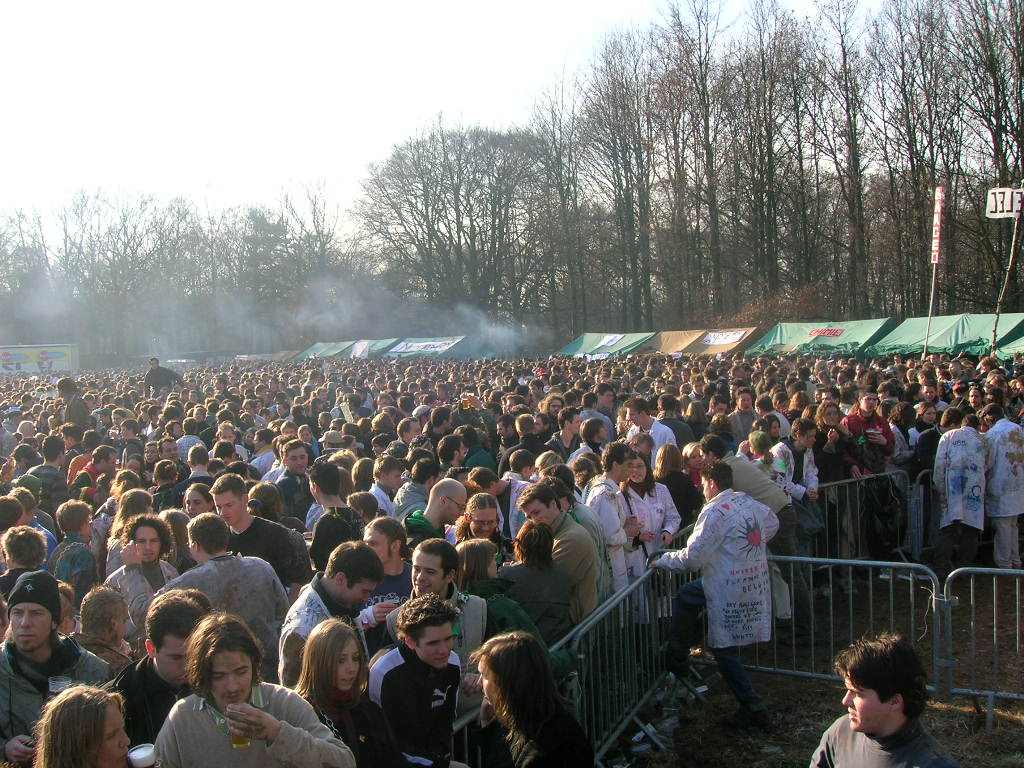
Belgian students at an event

Walloons are a French-speaking people who live in Belgium, principally in Wallonia. Walloons are a distinctive community within Belgium, important historical and anthropological criteria (religion, language, traditions, folklore) bind Walloons to the French people. More generally, the term also refers to the inhabitants of the Walloon Region. They may speak regional languages such as Walloon (with Picard in the West and Gaumais in the South).

Though roughly three-quarters of Belgium's French speakers live in Wallonia, French-speaking residents of Brussels tend not to identify as Walloons.

=== German-speaking community ===
The German-speaking Community of Belgium is one of the three constitutionally recognized federal communities of Belgium. Covering an area of less than 1,000 km^{2} within the province of Liège in Wallonia, it includes nine of the eleven municipalities of the so-called East Cantons and the local population numbers over 79,000 – less than 1% of the national total. Bordering the Netherlands, Germany and Luxembourg, the area has its own parliament and government at Eupen.

The German-speaking community is composed of the German-speaking parts of the lands that were annexed in 1920 from Germany. In addition, in contemporary Belgium there are also some other German-speaking areas that belonged to Belgium even before 1920, but they are not currently considered officially part of the German-speaking community in Belgium: Bleiberg-Welkenraat-Baelen in Northeastern province of Liège and Arelerland (city of Arlon and some of its nearby villages in Southeastern province of Belgian Luxembourg). However, in these localities, the German language is highly endangered due to the adoption of French.

== Religion ==
Roman Catholicism has traditionally been Belgium's majority religion, with approximately 65% of the Belgians declaring themselves to be Catholics. However, by 2004, nationwide Sunday church attendance was only about 4 to 8% (9% for Flanders only). A 2006 inquiry in Flanders, long considered more religious than the Brussels or Wallonia regions in Belgium, showed 55% of its inhabitants calling themselves religious, while 36% said that they believed that God created the world.

== Demographics ==
Belgium had a population of 11,825,551 people on 1 January 2025, an increase of 61,901 in comparison to 2024. Population growth in mainly driven by migration. The population of Flanders, Wallonia and Brussels on 1 January 2025 was 6,864,766 (58.1%), 3,704,990 (31.3%) and 1,255,795 (10.6%), respectively.

== See also ==
- Belgian American
- Belgian Australians
- Belgian Brazilian
- Belgian Canadians
- Walloons in the Netherlands
- Walloon immigration to Sweden
- Walloons in Wisconsin
- Flemish people
- Walloons
- Belgian nationality law
