= Montenegrin diaspora =

Montenegrin emigrants and their descendants

Total population
- c. 620,000

Regions with significant populations
- United States
- Argentina
- Germany
- France
- Serbia
- Luxembourg
- Chile
- Italy
- Canada
- Croatia
- Netherlands
- Slovenia
- Switzerland
- Bolivia
- Paraguay
- Bosnia and Herzegovina
- Australia
- Sweden
- United Kingdom
- North Macedonia
- Norway
- Denmark
- Albania
- Russia
- Belgium
- Brazil

Languages
- Predominantly Montenegrin, Serbian, Albanian English, Spanish, German and French, among others

Religion
- Majority: Eastern Orthodoxy; Minority: Islam, Roman Catholicism and Irreligion

Related ethnic groups
- Montenegrins, Montenegrin Americans, Montenegrin Argentine, Montenegrin Germans

The Montenegrin diaspora (Montenegrin: Црногорска дијаспора) consists of communities of ethnic Montenegrins and/or Montenegrin citizens living outside Montenegro. Estimates on its size are only approximate because of incomplete statistical records and naturalization, but (highest) estimates suggest that the Montenegrin diaspora may be as large as the nation's population of 620,000.

== Communities ==
=== United States ===
At the end of the 19th and early 20th centuries, mass migration of Montenegrins into America occurred. It went in groups, but also individually. First of all, young people from the coastal part of Montenegro were leaving: Boka, Pastrovici, the surroundings of Budva, then from Crmnica, Katun nahija, Gragova, Krivosija, Vilusa, so that in a few years the departure would be extended to the region of Niksic, Bjelopavlici, Piva, Zabljak, Moraca and the whole northern part of Montenegro.

The number of emigrants has grown from year to year. According to the passport book, which was carefully conducted from 1864 to 1914 in the Kingdom of Montenegro, in the United States, according to Pavel Rovinsky, there were 17 thousand young Montenegrins. This is stated in the "Glas Crnogorca", which was at that time in Cetinje, as well as in the "Slobodna Misao" newspaper in Niksic. Interesting is the fact that in 1903, in the course of five months, from the beginning of August to the end of December, 621 Montenegrins went to America.

Today, it is estimated that there are 40,000 Montenegrins in the United States and these Montenegrins mainly live in the central and eastern United States, consisting of Albanians from Ulcinj and Tuzi, and Bosniak Muslims of Bar, Plav and Gusinje; much of which is concentrated in New York City and Chicago, and to a lesser extent in Detroit, and recent arrivals from former Yugoslavia in the Los Angeles area.

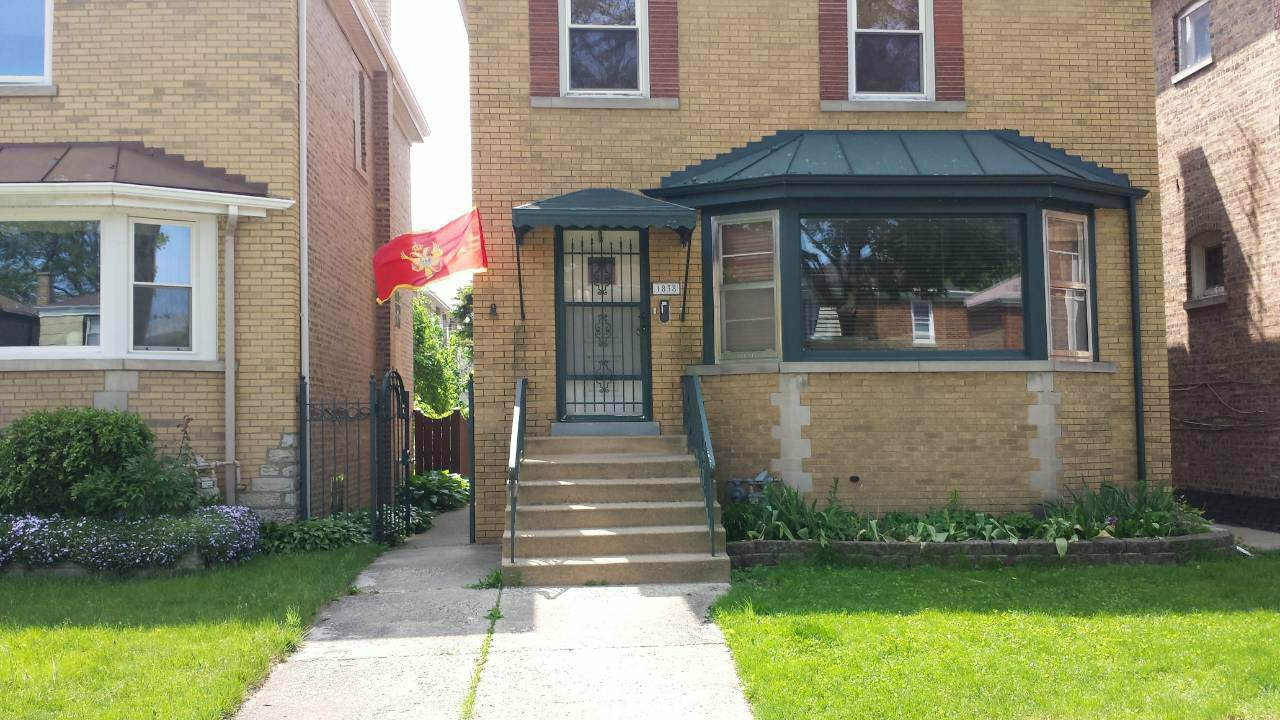
Montenegrin flag in Chicago

Montenegrin Americans are found throughout the state of Alaska. About a quarter of all known Montenegrin Americans live in Anchorage. Their presence in Alaska dates back to the gold rushes of the early 20th century.

=== Argentina ===
During the early 1900s, Montenegrins from the Kingdom of Montenegro began emigrating to the country, and nowadays there are approximately 50,000 Montenegrins and descendants living in Argentina. Besides Poles (450,000) and Croatians (440,000) they are one of the most populous Slavic communities in Argentina. Currently most of them are located in the northern province of Chaco, while the remaining part lives in Buenos Aires, Tandil, Venado Tuerto, and General Madariaga.

Descendants of ethnic Montenegrins established Colonia La Montenegrina, the largest Montenegrin colony in South America, in which they are part of even today. General Madariaga is a specially important place for Montenegrins in Argentina since many of them have achieved a remarkable wealth there through the business of cattle breeding, and most Montenegrins and their descendants are buried in its cemetery. Additionally, the Montenegrin-Argentine organization, Yugoslav Society Njegoš (Sociedad Yugoslava Njegoš, previously called the Montenegrin Society and Montenegrin-Yugoslav Society for Mutual Aid before World War II) provides mutual aid inside the town.

=== Germany ===
Montenegrins in Germany are supported and represented by various associations. They number around 30,000. It is the largest Montenegrin diaspora in the EU.

Some Montenegrins immigrated during the 1960s and 1970s as Gastarbeiter ("guest workers") when Montenegro was still a part of Yugoslavia. A minority arrived as refugees during the Yugoslav Wars in the 1990s.

Some Montenegrins still want to migrate to Germany, especially from the northern parts of Montenegro. In 2015, approximately 6,000 attempted to travel into Germany to seek asylum but were unsuccessful. In 2016, 683 Montenegrins were granted work permits. In 2017, this number rose to 876. In 2018, Germany made it easier for Montenegrins to gain a work permit.

== See also ==
- Montenegro
- Montenegrins
- Montenegrin language
- List of Montenegrins
