= Chechen refugees =

During the inter-ethnic strife in Chechnya and the First and Second Chechen Wars for independence hundreds of thousands of Chechen refugees have left their homes and left the republic for elsewhere in Russia and abroad.

== In Russia ==
The Internal Displacement Monitoring Centre (IDMC) reports that hundreds of thousands of people fled their homes in Chechnya since 1990. This included majority of Chechnya non-Chechen population of 300,000 (mostly Russians, but also Armenians, Ingush, Georgians, Ukrainians and many more) who had left the republic in the early 1990s and as of 2008 never returned.

Many ethnic Chechens have also moved to Moscow and other Russian cities. According to the 2008 study by the Norwegian Refugee Council, some 139,000 Chechens remained displaced in the Russian Federation.

=== Ingushetia ===
In the nearby republic of Ingushetia, at the peak of the refugee crisis after the start of the Second Chechen War in 2000, estimated 240,000 refugees almost doubled the Ingushetia's pre-war population of 300,000 (350,000 including the refugees from the Ingush-Ossetian conflict) and resulting in an epidemic of tuberculosis. Estimated 325,000 was the total number of people that have entered Ingushetia as refugees in the first year of the Second Chechen War. Some 185,000 were in the republic already by November 1999 and 215,000 lived in Ingushetia by June 2000. In October 1999 the border with Ingushetia was closed down by the Russian military and a refugee convoy bombed after being turned away.

Thousands of them were pressured to return by the Russian military already in December 1999, and the refugee camps were forcibly closed after 2001 by the new Chechen government of President Akhmad Kadyrov and the new Ingush government of President Murat Zyazikov. About 180,000 Chechens remained in Ingushetia by February 2002 and 150,000 by June 2002, most of them housed in a "tent city" camps, abandoned farms and factories and disused trains, or living with sympathetic families. As of early 2007, less than 20,000 Chechens remained in Ingushetia and many of them were expected to integrate locally rather than return to Chechnya.

=== Chechnya ===
As of 2006, more than 100,000 people remain internally displaced persons (IDP) within Chechnya, most of whom live in substandard housing and poverty. All official IDP centers in the republic were closed down and the foreign NGO aid severely limited by the government (including the ban of the Danish Refugee Council).

== Abroad ==
Since 2003 there is a sharp surge of Chechen asylum-seekers arriving abroad, at a time when major combat operations had largely ceased. One explanation is the process of "Chechenization", which empowered former separatists Ahmed Kadyrov and his son Ramzan Kadyrov as the leaders of Chechnya (indeed, Chechen refugees indicated that they feared Chechen security forces more than Russian troops). Another explanation is that after a decade of war and lawlessness, many Chechens have given up hope of ever rebuilding a normal life at home and instead try to start a new life in exile.

=== European Union ===
In 2003, some 33,000 Russian citizens (over 90% of them presumed to be Chechens) applied for Asylum in the European Union (EU), according to the United Nations High Commissioner for Refugees, making them the largest group of new refugees arriving in developed nations. According to unofficial reports from January 2008, the number of Chechens in Europe may reach 70,000. According to another estimate from March 2009, there were some 130,000 Chechen refugees in Europe, including former fighters. In September 2009 Kadyrov said that Chechnya would open representative offices in Europe in an attempt to convince the Chechen migrant communities living there to return to their homeland.

Austria granted asylum rights to more than 2,000 Chechen refugees in 2007, bringing the total number to 17,000 in January 2008, the largest diaspora in Europe then. As of 2018, there were some 30,000 Chechens residing in Austria.

As of early 2008, some 7,000-10,000 Chechens live in Belgium, many of them in Aarschot. At least 2,000 of them were granted political asylum in 2003.

In 2003, refugee camps in the Czech Republic were said to be "overwhelmed" due to an overwhelming number of Chechen refugees.

As of 2009, Denmark is one of the six countries in Europe with the biggest Chechen diasporas.

As of early 2008, about 10,000 Chechens live in France. The largest Chechen communities in France exist in Nice (where there were reports of sharp conflict with the immigrants from North Africa), Strasbourg and Paris (the home of the Chechen-French Center). Chechens also live in Orléans, Le Mans, Besançon, Montpellier, Toulouse and Tours. As of 2008, thousands more are trying to get to France from Poland.

As of early 2008, approximately 10,000 Chechens live in Germany.

In Poland, almost 3,600 Chechens have applied for refugee status in the first eight months of 2007 alone and over 6,000 in the next four months. As of 2008, the Chechens are the greatest group (90% in 2007) of refugees arriving in Poland, on the eastern border of the EU.

Spain has granted hundreds of Chechen families asylum since 1999.

Thousands of others settled in the other EU countries, such as Sweden or Finland.

=== Other countries ===
Of 12,000 Chechen refugees who arrived in Azerbaijan, most moved on to Europe later (leaving some 5,000 in 2003, 2,000 in 2007, 586 in 2014, and 377 in 2019).

(Canada) As of early 2008, several hundred people live in the Canadian community.

(Georgia (country)) Of some 4,000 Chechens who have sought safety in neighbouring Georgia, the majority have settled in Pankisi Gorge and over 1,100 registered refugees remain there as of 2008.

Some 3,000 to 4,000 Chechens arrived in Turkey, of which most also moved on further, but as of 2005 some 1,500 stayed. Many of the Chechen refugees in Turkey are yet to be given official refugee status by the Turkish government, without this status they will be unable to legally attend school or have jobs.

Ukraine is the main transit country for Chechen refugees traveling to Europe (some others travel through Belarus). There is also a small number of Chechens settled in Crimea. Since Yanukovich was elected, he has begun harassing the Chechen refugee settlements through police raids and sudden deportations, sometimes even separating families.

As of early 2008, some 2,000-3,000 refugees live in the United Arab Emirates.

In the United Kingdom there is a large number of Chechen refugees. Some of them are wanted by Russia but the UK government refuses to extradite them on grounds of concern for human rights. Some of the original Chechen separatist government figures, such as Akhmed Zakayev relocated to the UK.

A small, but growing Chechen community exists in the United States, in particular California and New Jersey.

Both Azerbaijan and Georgia have extradited some Chechen refugees to Russia in violation of their obligations under international law. The European Court of Human Rights has ruled that Georgia violated their rights.

During the 2008 South Ossetia war, many of the more than 1,000 Chechen refugees in Pankisi Gorge fled towards Turkey along with their Georgian neighbours.

== Chechen refugees and exiles ==
- Ilyas Akhmadov
- Khassan Baiev
- Murat Gasayev
- Umar Israilov
- Mamed Khalidov
- Timur Mutsurayev
- Milana Terloeva
- Sulim Yamadayev
- Zelimkhan Yandarbiyev
- Akhmed Zakayev

== See also ==
- Chechen diaspora
- Chechens in Kyrgyzstan
- Muhajir (Caucasus), the emigration of Muslim indigenous peoples from the Caucasus into the Ottoman Empire and Persia following the Russian conquest during the 19th century.
