= Finns in Switzerland =

- (Finland) (Switzerland)

Total population
- 7,000

Languages
- Finnish, Swedish, German, French and Italian

Finns in Switzerland consist of migrants from Finland to Switzerland and their descendants. According to one estimate there are 7,000 Finns living in Switzerland, of whom 4,000 are first generation immigrants and 3,000 are second generation immigrants. Most of the first generation immigrants are women in their 40s and 50s, many of whom immigrated from 1960–70. Most Finns in Switzerland live in the Canton of Zürich.

The first Finnish schools of Switzerland were located in Bern and Zürich, and opened in 1982. Schweizerische Vereinigung der Freunde Finnlands (SVFF) began to operate in 1946, and has since published a newspaper called Suomen Sanomat until it was changed to Finnland Magazin. This newspaper is issued four times a year. Sveitsin suomenkielinen kirkollinen toiminta (SSKT) organizes Finnish language church activities around Switzerland.

== Notable people ==
- Kimi Räikkönen
- Carl Gustaf Emil Mannerheim

== See also ==
- Finland–Switzerland relations
- Swiss people in Finland
- Finnish diaspora
- Immigration to Switzerland
