= Poluverniki =

17th century Estonian Christian group

The Poluverniks existed in Ida-Viru County.

Poluverniki or poluvertsy (Estonian: pooleusulised) 'half believers' was a term used for a group of Estonian-Votian-Russian Christians in the 17th century, who mixed Orthodox traditions with Lutheranism. The Poluverniki were born as many Orthodox Christians in Eastern Estonia converted to Lutheranism in East Viru Country as a result of assimilation into Estonian culture. Most Poluverniki were either converts with a Russian or a Votian background. The Poluverniks attended Lutheran congregations, however following many elements of Orthodoxy. The term "Poluvernik" was also used for the Setu people, but they are distinct from the Poluverniks of Northern Estonia. Despite later efforts to Russify the poluverniks, only a small portion of them remained Russian speaking.
