= Burgenland Roma =

Subgroup of Romani people

Burgenland Roma are a subgroup of Romani people in Austria who traditionally settled in Burgenland. The Burgenland Roma speak a Romani dialect for which the past imperfect tense ending is -ahi. The Burgenland Roma are related to groups of Romani people in southern Slovakia, Slovenia and in a few settlements in northern Hungary. Traditional professions of the Burgenland Roma are blacksmith trade and music.

In 1995, four Romani men were killed in Oberwart in a pipe bomb attack near their homes. A small memorial has been placed at the location of the incident.

== Notable people ==
- Stefan Horvath
- Rudolf Sarközi
- Tony Wegas
