= Krubans =

Krëbanë (Kashubian) Krubanie (Polish)

Regions with significant populations
- Poland (Pomeranian Voivodeship)

Languages
- Kashubian, Polish

Religion
- Roman Catholicism

Related ethnic groups
- Kashubians, Poles

Krubans, (Note: Kashubian: Krëbanë, Krëbanie; Polish: Krubanie, Krubany) also known as Zaborans, (Note: Kashubian: Zabòrôcë, Zoborôcë; Polish: Zaboracy, Zaboraki) is an ethnographic group of Kashubian people, originating from southeastern part of Kashubia, known as Zabory, located in the Pomeranian Voivodeship, Poland. They inhabit the gminas (municipalities) of Dziemiany and Karsin of the Kościerzyna County, and the Gmina Brusy of Chojnice County.
