= Votians =

Finnic ethnic group in Ingria, modern Russia

Votians vađđalaizõd
- Flag of Votians

Total population
- 109

Regions with significant populations
- Russia: 99 (2020)
- Estonia: 10 (2021)

Languages
- Votic, Russian, Ingrian, Estonian

Religion
- Eastern Orthodox; Lutheran; Poluverniki

Related ethnic groups
- Other Baltic Finns; Especially Estonians, Poluverniki, Livonians, Setos, and Võros

Votians, also referred to as Votes, Vots and Vods (Votic: vađđalaizõd; Russian: водь; Estonian: vadjalased; Finnish: vatjalaiset) are a Finnic ethnic group native to historical Ingria, the part of modern-day northwestern Russia that is roughly southwest of Saint Petersburg and east of the Estonian border-town of Narva. The Finnic Votic language spoken by Votians is close to extinction. The language is still spoken in three villages of historical Votia and by an unknown number of speakers in the countryside. The villages are Jõgõperä (Krakolye), Liivcülä (Peski), and Luuditsa (Luzhitsy). In the Russian 2020 census, 99 people identified as Votian.

Votians were one of the founding people of Veliky Novgorod.

In 2002–2005, within the framework of the activities of the Votian Cultural Society, modern symbols of Votes were developed: a coat of arms and a flag. The Votian flag is a wedge-shaped white field with a red cross and two blue triangles on the edges. The white wedge symbolizes the land of Votians, and the blue triangles the waters of Lake Peipus and the Gulf of Finland, between which the Votian land was located. The red cross on the white wedge symbolizes the memory of the ancestors.

== History ==
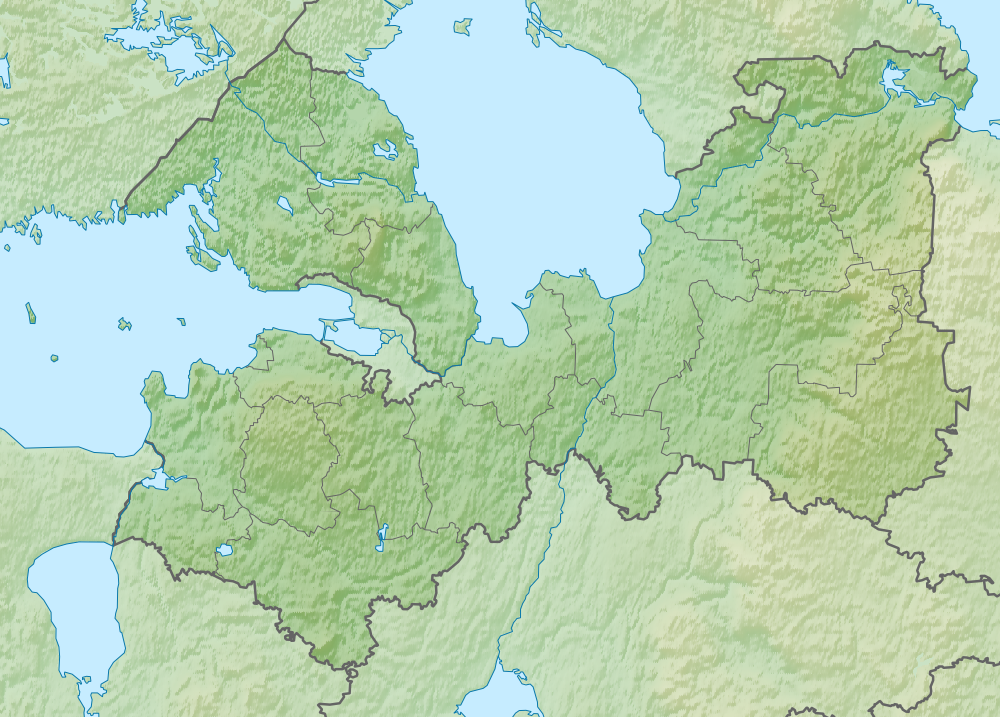
Leningrad Oblast, Russia, showing Kingisepp (Russian: Кингисепп)

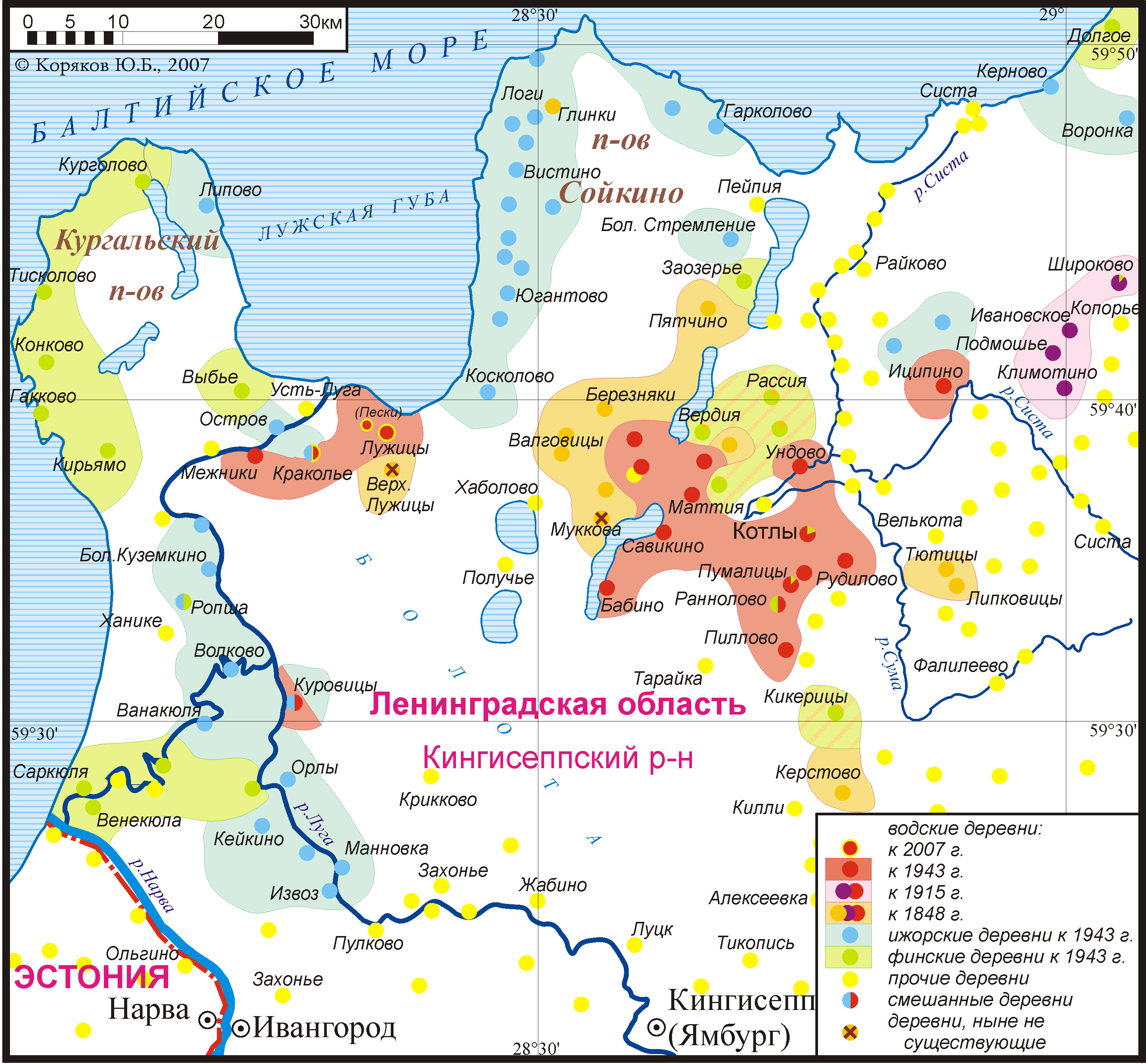
A map of Votic and neighbouring Ingrian-Finnish and Izhorian villages 1848–2007. Votic villages (1848–2007) Izhorian villages (by 1943) Finnish villages (by 1943) Other villages

Votians are the oldest known ethnic group in Ingria. They are probably descended from an Iron-age population of north-eastern Estonia and western Ingria. Some scholars claim they were a tribe of Estonians, who developed a separate identity during isolation from other Estonians. It is speculated the ancient Estonian county of Vaiga got its name from Votians. The Kylfings, a people active in Northern Europe during the Viking Age, may have been Votes.

The earliest literary references to the Votes by their traditional name are from medieval Russian sources, where Votes are referred to as Voď. Older Russian sources grouped them (under the name Chudes) with Estonians. Lake Peipus near the Votian homelands is called Chudsko ozero, meaning "Lake of Chudes" in Russian.

In 1069, the Votes were mentioned taking part in an attack on the Novgorod Republic by the Principality of Polotsk. Eventually the Votes became part of the Novgorod Republic, and in 1149 they were mentioned taking part in an attack by Novgorod against Jems, who are speculated to be peoples of Tavastia. One of the administrative divisions of Novgorod, Voch'skaa, was named after Votes. After the collapse of Novgorod in the 1470s, the Grand Principality of Moscow deported many Votes from their homelands, and began more aggressive conversion of them. Missionary efforts started in 1534, after Novgorod's archbishop Macarius complained to Ivan IV that Votes were still practicing their pagan beliefs. Macarius was authorized to send monk Ilja to convert the Votes. Ilja destroyed many of the old holy shrines and worshipping places. Conversion was slow and the next archbishop Feodosii II of Novgorod had to send priest Nikifor to continue Ilja's work. Slowly Votes were converted and they became devoted Christians.

Sweden controlled Ingria in the 17th century, and attempts to convert local Orthodox believers to the Lutheran faith caused some of the Orthodox population to migrate elsewhere. At the same time many Finnish peoples immigrated to Ingria. Religion separated the Lutheran Finns and Estonians and the Orthodox Izhorians and Votes, so intermarriage was uncommon between these groups. Votes mainly married other Votes, or Izhorians and Russians. They were mostly trilingual in Votic, Ingrian and Russian. In 1848, the number of Votes had been 5,148, (Ariste 1981: 78), but in the Soviet Russian census of 1926 there were only 705 left. From the early 20th century on, the Votic language no longer passed to following generations. Most Votes were evacuated to Finland along with Finnish Ingrians during World War II, but were returned to the Soviet Union following the September 1944 Moscow Armistice.

As a distinct people, Votes have become practically extinct after Stalinist dispersion to distant Soviet provinces as 'punishment' for alleged disloyalty and cowardice during World War II. Expellees allowed to return in 1956 found their old homes occupied by Russians. In 1989, there were still 62 known Votes left, with the youngest born in 1930. There were 73 self-declared Votes in the 2002 Russian census. Of them 12 lived in Saint Petersburg, 12 in Leningrad Oblast and 10 in Moscow. In 2008 Votes were added to the list of Indigenous peoples of Russia, granting them some support to preserving their culture. There have been some conflicts with Votic villagers and foresters, and in 2001 the Votic museum was burned in the village of Lužitsõ. Another possible problem is a port which is being constructed to Ust-Luga. It is planned that some 35,000 people would move near historic Votic and Izhoran villages.

== Votes in Latvia ==
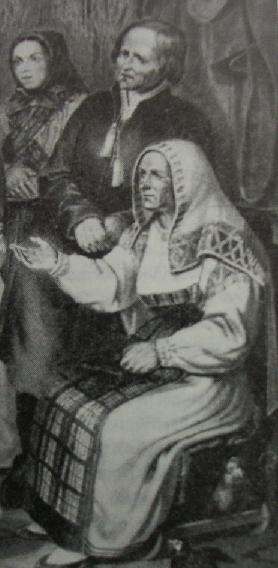
Latvian Votes in their national costumes, drawn by de Pauly

The Votes in Latvia were called krieviņi in Latvian. The word comes from krievs, which means "Russian". Historical sources indicate the Teutonic Knights led by Vinke von Overberg captured many people in Ingermanland during their attack there in 1444–1447, and moved them to Bauska, where a workforce was needed to build a castle. It is estimated that some 3,000 people were transferred there. After the castle was built, the Votes did not go back, but were settled in the vicinity of Bauska and became farmers. Gradually, they forgot their own language and customs and were assimilated by the neighboring Latvians. They are first mentioned in literature of 1636. The first "modern" scientist to study them was Finnish Anders Johan Sjögren, but the first person to connect them with Votes was Ferdinand Johan Wiedemann in 1872. Latvian poet Jānis Rainis had some Votic roots.

Some modern people in Latvia around Bauska, with historic Krevinian ancestry still wish to identify with Votians and there has been new interest in Votian culture among them. There also exists a Votic museum in Latvia.

== Votes in Estonia ==
Votians used to live largely within the Narva region. Votes largely mixed with the Estonians, there exists information about Christians called poluverniki ("half believers"), who mixed Orthodoxy and Lutheranism, this form of Christianity was practiced due to Orthodox Votians mixing with the Lutheran Estonians. Paul Ariste found that the Votic language influenced many Northern Estonian dialects. Today Estonia still has Votian cultural events in Narva.

== Culture ==
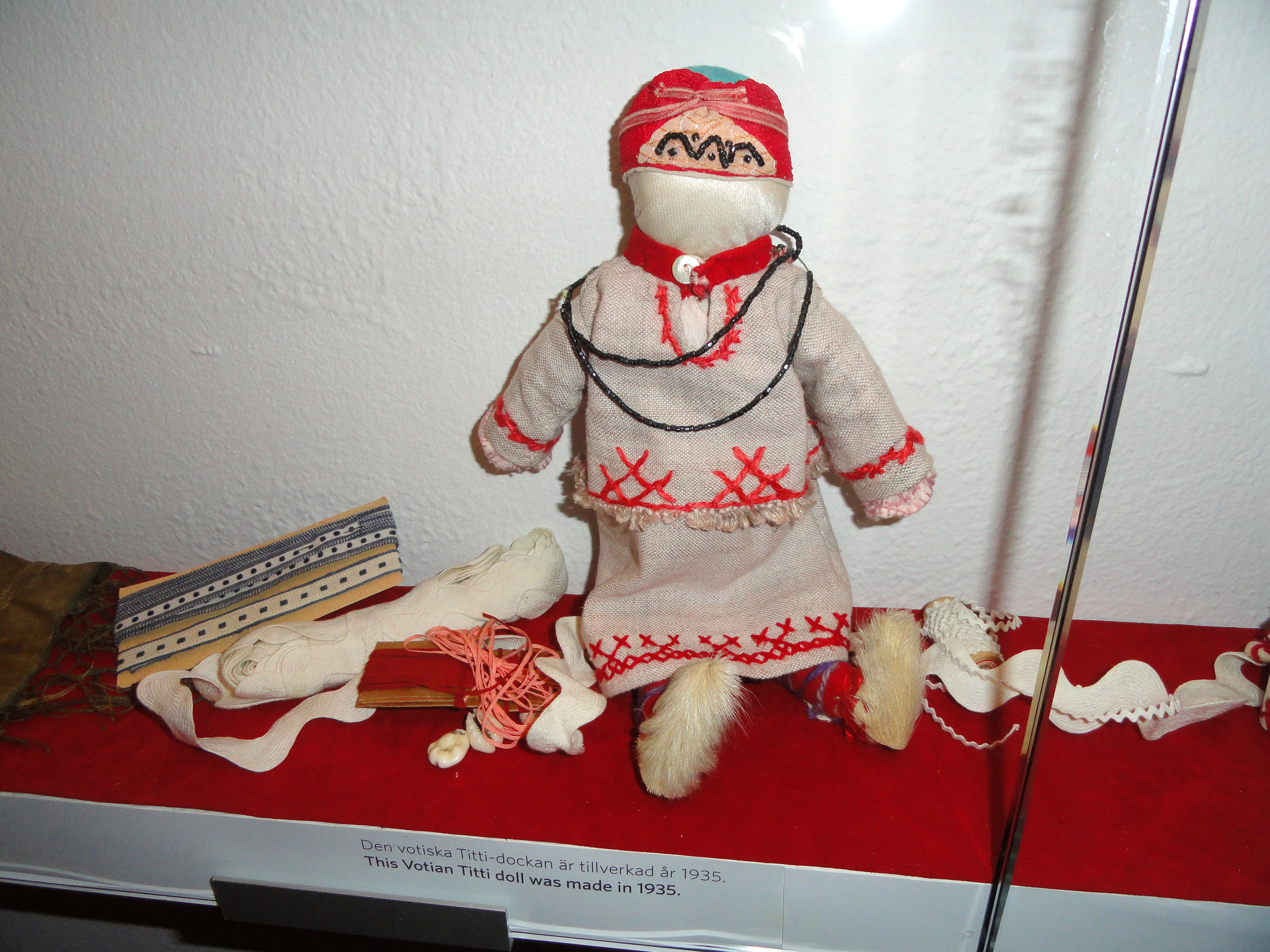
Votic doll on display at Museum of Cultures, Finland

Historically most Votes were farmers. Slash and burn (sardo) was practiced until the early 20th century. Cattle, horses and geese were the most important livestock. Some made their living from fishing. Many primitive fishing habits survived a long time in Votic communities, such as fishing with a club or spear. Seine fishing was practiced during the winter. Votians formed seine groups (artelli) and made fishing trips as far as the Finnish outer islands like Seskar. Fishermen lived in wooden sleds called (pudka) during these trips. Hunting was never an important source of income, because local nobility had reserved the right to hunt to themselves. Since St. Petersburg was so close to Votic homelands, many of the Votes went working there. Men worked in factories and women worked as servants. This contributed to rapid demise of Votic culture.

Votes were quite poorly educated, and only one Vote, Dmitri Tsvetkov, is known to have ever attended and graduated from a university. Ancient Votic religion is not known well, but it is assumed that it was similar to other Finnic beliefs.

=== Language and identity ===
Most Votes were able to speak Ingrian and Russian as well as the Votic language. In fact, Ingrian was more common in everyday use than Votic in some villages. Votic was commonly used with family members, while Russian and Ingrian were used with others. Russian was the only language used in churches. Votes often referred to themselves as Izhorians, since this term was more commonly known among others. The term came in use when people wanted to make a difference between Lutheran and Orthodox Finnic populations in Ingria.

== Genetics ==
According to a 2024 study, the majority of Votians belong to the paternal haplogroup R1a, making up over two thirds. Their second most common haplogroup is N1c, which is typical for Finno-Ugric peoples, a small proportion of Votes have haplogroup I2a1. When comparing the paternal lineages (combination of ancient haplogroups) of Votians to other Baltic-Finnic groups living in Russia and Slavic Central Russians, they are closer to the latter. However, in terms of autosomal DNA, they resemble other Baltic Finns, especially Izhorians and Ingrian Finns, and differ from Central Russians.
