= Chechens in France =

Ethnic group in France

Total population
- 30,000–60,000

Chechens in France (Chechen: Пранцойчура нохчий, romanized Prancoyçura noxçiy; French: les Tchétchènes en France) belong to the Chechen diaspora.

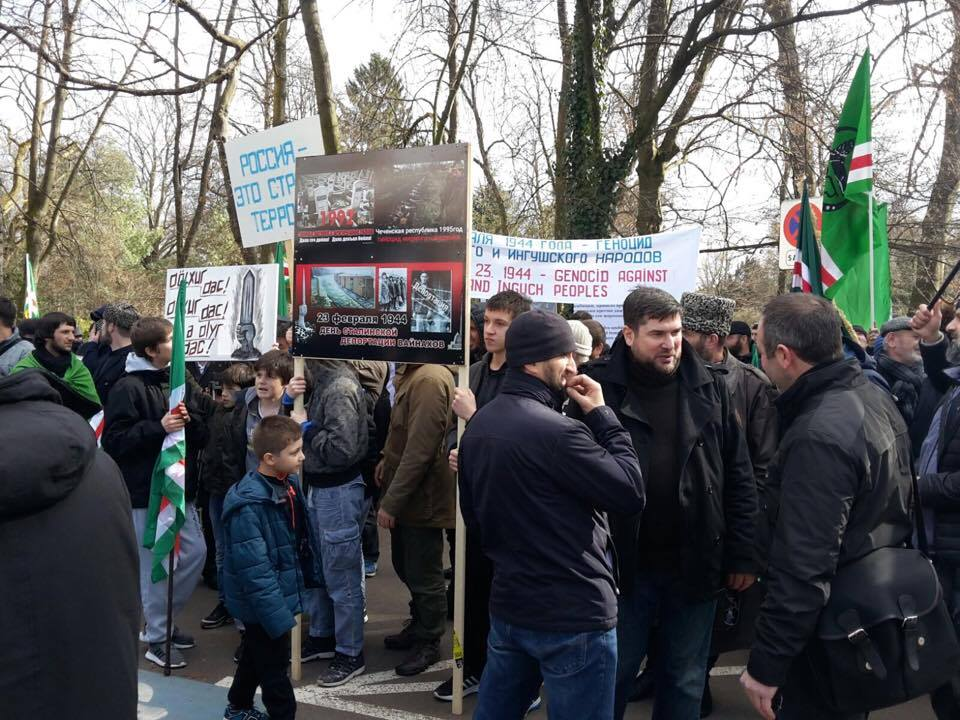
Commemoration of Chechen genocide anniversary committed by Stalin in 1944, in Strasbourg, France by diaspora members.

== History ==
Chechen immigrants came to France as political refugees in the early 2000s, fleeing from the war in their home. Today, there are between 30,000 and 60,000 Chechens in France, making it the largest community among the Chechen diaspora in Europe.

The Chechen diaspora in France live mainly in Nice and Strasbourg, both cities with the highest proportion of Chechen people in the country. There are also significant Chechen communities in Orléans, Saint-Étienne, Rennes and Toulouse.

== Notable people ==
- Zelimkhan Khadjiev, wrestler
- Milana Terloeva, author and reporter
- Baysangur Chamsoudinov, MMA Fighter
- Ramzan Jembiev, MMA Fighter

== See also ==
- 2020 Dijon riots
- Murder of Samuel Paty
