= German Sign Language family =

European sign language family

German Sign Language
- Geographic distribution: Europe
- Linguistic classification: One of the world's sign language families
- Subdivisions: German Sign; Polish Sign; Israeli Sign

Language codes
- Glottolog: dgsi1234

The German Sign Language family is a language family of sign languages, including German Sign Language, Polish Sign Language and probably Israeli Sign Language.

Anderson (1979) suggested that Swedish Sign, German Sign and British Sign share one origin in a "North-West European" sign language.

== See also ==
- Swiss German Sign Language
