= Chechen diaspora =

Chechen people who live outside of Chechnya

The Chechen diaspora (Chechen: Нохчийн диаспора, romanized: Noxçiyn diaspora) is a term used to collectively describe the communities of Chechen people who live outside of Chechnya; this includes Chechens who live in other parts of Russia. There are also significant Chechen populations in other subdivisions of Russia (especially in Dagestan, Ingushetia and Moscow Oblast).

Outside Russia, Chechens are mainly descendants of people who had to leave Chechnya during the 19th century Caucasian War (which led to the annexation of Chechnya by the Russian Empire) and the 1944 Stalinist deportation to the Soviet Central Asia in the case of Kazakhstan. More recently, tens of thousands of Chechen refugees settled in the European Union and elsewhere as the result of the First and Second Chechen Wars, especially in the wave of emigration to the West after 2002.

== Geography ==
Distribution of Chechens in Russia, 2010

== Statistics by country ==
Country	Official figures	%	Current est. Chechen population	Further information
Russia	1,674,854 (2021 census)	1.28%	—	
Turkey	12,626 (1965 census, Chechen speakers)	0.04%	Approx. 100,000	Chechens in Turkey
France	—N/a	—N/a	approx. 67,000	Chechens in France
Kazakhstan	32,252 (2013 annual statistics)	0.2%	—	—
Austria	—N/a	—N/a	approx. 30,000 − 40,000	Chechens in Austria
Belgium	—N/a	—N/a	approx. 17,000	—
Jordan	—N/a	—N/a	approx. 12,000 − 30,000	Chechens in Jordan
Germany	—N/a	—N/a	approx. 50,000	—
Egypt	—N/a	—N/a	approx. 5,000	—
Syria	—N/a	—N/a	approx. 4,000	Chechens in Syria
Ukraine	2,877 (2001 census)	0.01%	—	—
Kyrgyzstan	1,875 (2009 census)	0%	—	—
Georgia	1,271 (2002 census)	0%	—	—
Uzbekistan	1,006 (1989 census)	0.01%	—	—
Denmark	—N/a	—N/a	approx. 1,000	—
United States	—N/a	—N/a	approx. 1,000	—
Finland	636 (2017 annual statistics, Chechen speakers)	0.01%	—	—
Azerbaijan	456 (1989 census)	0.01%	—	—
Poland	338 (2011 census)	0%	—	—
Latvia	136–189 (2023 statistics)	−0%	—	—
Moldova	108 (2004 census)	0%	—	—
Lithuania	72 (1989 census)	0%	—	—

== See also ==
- Chechen refugees
- Chechen Americans
