= Crimean Tatar dialects =

Although distant from the Turkic language Urheimat, due to its unique history, Crimea has served as a contact zone between the Kipchak and Oghuz branches of the Turkic language family. Centuries of interaction and migration—involving Kipchak Turks from the Golden Horde and the Crimean Khanate to the north, and Oghuz speakers from the Ottoman Empire to the south—resulted in a north-to-south dialect continuum. Traditionally, this complex continuum is simplified into three dialects based on degree of Kipchak to Oghuz influence: northern, central, and southern. The standard language is derived from the central dialect.

== Middle dialect ==
The middle dialect was traditionally spoken in the urban heartland of the Khanate from Bakhchysarai to Staryi Krym, and its surrounding countryside, known as the foothills.

Standard Crimean Tatar and the middle dialect it is derived from are classified as a language of the Cuman (Russian: кыпчакско-половецкая) subgroup of the Kipchak languages and the closest relatives are Karachay-Balkar, Karaim, Krymchak, Kumyk, Urum and extinct Cuman. The middle dialect, although thought to be of Kipchak-Cuman origin, combines elements of both Cuman and Oghuz languages.

The Cuman language arrived in Crimea with the first Turkic invasions of Crimea by Cumans and Pechenegs in the 11th Century. The Cuman language as it developed in Crimea is thought to have been the lingua franca of the Crimean Khanate.

== Southern dialect ==
The southern or coastal dialect was traditionally spoken in the coastal strip of Crimea corresponding to the territory of the Ottoman Eyalet of Kefe. From 1475 to 1774 The Ottoman Empire directly administered the former Genoese and Byzantine possessions along the south-coast, resulting in the spread of Ottoman Turkish culture and peoples, and subsequent Turkification. As a result of this history, the southern dialect is actually classified as an Oghuz language, due to its high similarity to Anatolian Turkish. Some have gone so far as to classify it as a dialect of Ottoman Turkish rather than Crimean Tatar. It has been described as extinct for several decades.

== Northern dialect ==
The Northern, or Steppe, Desert dialect (çöl, şimaliy) was traditionally spoken by Crimean Tatars in North Crimea. It has Nogai influence and even there are people who say that this dialect is part of Nogai language and related to Kazakh, Karakalpak, and Nogai proper. This dialect was spoken by former nomadic inhabitants of the Crimean steppe. It is thought that the Steppe Crimean Tatars of the Crimea and the Nogais of the Caucasus and Volga are of common origin from the Nogai Horde, which is reflected in their common name and very closely related languages. In the past some speakers of this dialects also called themselves Qıpçaq (that is Cumans).
