= German Sign Language =

Sign language predominantly used in Germany

- Native to: Germany, Belgium, Luxembourg
- Native speakers: Between 80,000 and 395,000 (2014)
- Language family: German Sign Language family: German Sign Language

Language codes
- ISO 639-3: gsg
- Glottolog: germ1281
- Areas where German Sign Language is a national language Areas where German Sign Language is in significant use alongside another sign language

German Sign Language, GSL (German: Deutsche Gebärdensprache, DGS) is the sign language of the deaf community in Germany, Luxembourg, and the German-speaking community of Belgium. Estimates regarding the precise number of active DGS signers vary considerably; Gallaudet University estimated approximately 50,000 primary users as of 1986, while broader contemporary estimates range up to 80,000. The language has evolved naturally through continuous use within deaf communities over several centuries.

== Recognition ==
Germany historically maintained a dominant oralist tradition following the Second International Congress on Education of the Deaf in Milan (1880), which led to widespread institutional suppression of sign language in educational settings. German Sign Language was first legally recognized under Federal Law via Section 6 of the Federal Disability Equality Act (Behindertengleichstellungsgesetz – BGG) in May 2002. Under this statute, deaf individuals possess a legal right to utilize DGS when interacting with federal administrative authorities free of charge.

Broadcast media inclusion remains limited. Public television coverage with signing is primarily restricted to major news broadcasts and summaries. One dedicated monthly/weekly program produced entirely in DGS is Sehen statt Hören (Seeing Instead of Hearing), a documentary-style news magazine produced by Bayerischer Rundfunk (BR) and syndicated across ARD regional state broadcasters.

In 2018, the Luxembourgish Chamber of Deputies voted unanimously to grant official recognition to German Sign Language.

== German and German Sign Language ==
German Sign Language is typologically independent of spoken German. While spoken German relies predominantly on a subject–verb–object (SVO) word order in main clauses, DGS employs a primary subject–object–verb (SOV) structural strategy. As a result, the two languages exhibit distinct syntactic and morphological structures, though spoken German has influenced DGS vocabulary through contact borrowing.

An artificial signing framework that forces sign production directly onto spoken German syntax is known as Signed German (Lautsprachbegleitende Gebärden or Lautbegleitende Gebärden, "sound-accompanying signs"). Used primarily in educational contexts, Signed German is an instructional tool rather than a natural, community-developed language. Another manual representation system for German phonology is cued speech, termed Phonembestimmes Manualsystem (Phonemic Manual System).

== Manual alphabet and fingerspelling ==
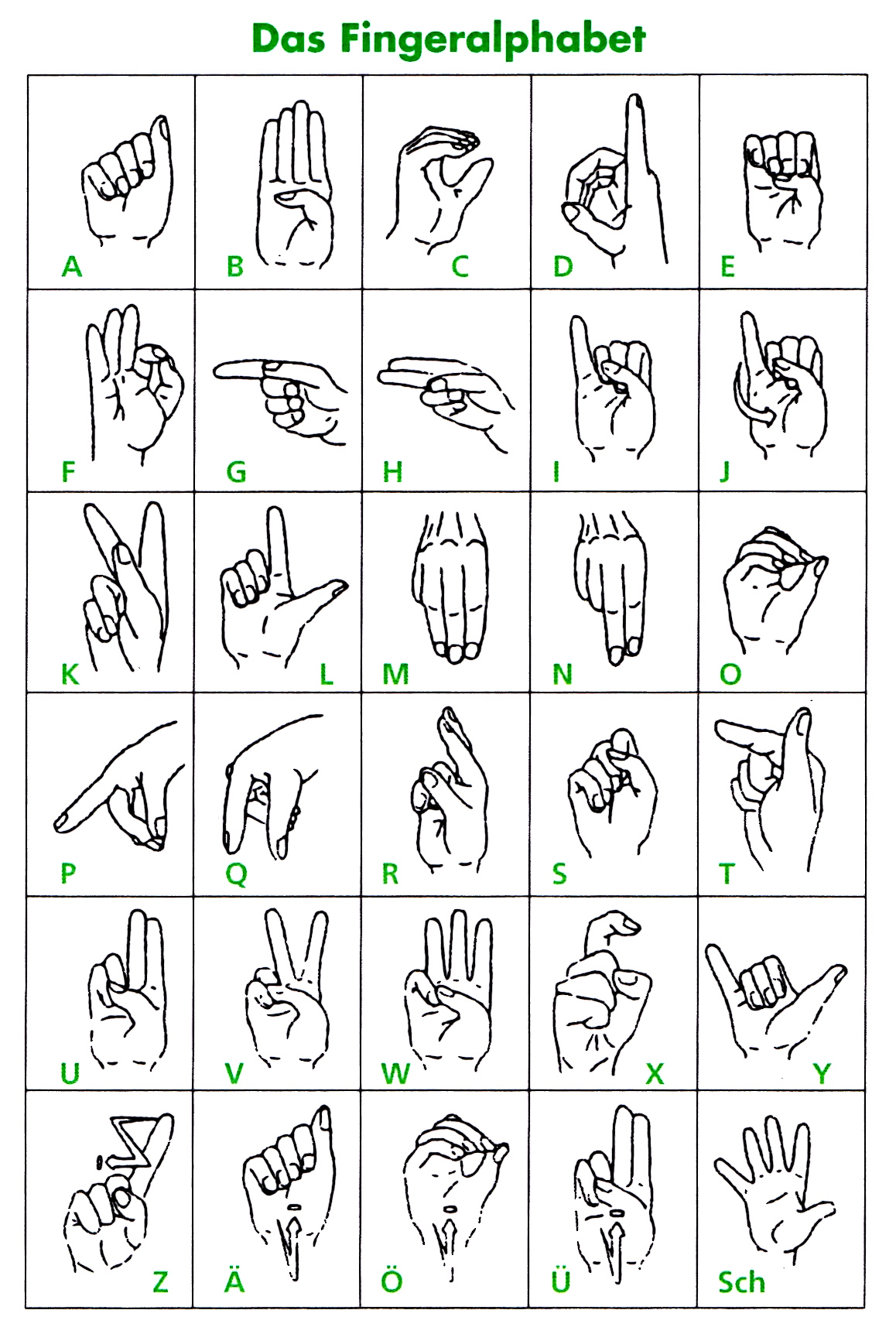
DGS manual alphabet

German Sign Language employs a one-handed manual alphabet ('Fingeralphabet') derived from the 18th-century French manual alphabet. It is closely related to manual alphabets used across Europe and North America. It differs from the American Sign Language (ASL) manual alphabet in the configuration of the letter T and the addition of a designated sign for SCH (a 'five' handshape). Additional letters representing German umlauts (Ä, Ö, Ü) and the letter ß are formed by executing a downward spatial shift of the base signs for A, O, U, and S.

== Dialects and related languages ==
Regional variants of German Sign Language exist, notably around major urban centers such as Hamburg, Berlin, and Munich. Sign varieties in regions corresponding to former East Germany demonstrate distinct vocabulary divergences from western dialects.

Polish Sign Language descended historically from German Sign Language. Israeli Sign Language also shares ancestral ties, having originated from the signing methods used by German Jewish educators who established a school for deaf children in Jerusalem in 1932. DGS is not structurally related to Austrian Sign Language or Swiss Sign Language; both belong to the French Sign Language family, despite limited lexical borrowing from DGS due to geographic proximity.

== Notation systems ==
Everyday signers do not use a standard written script for DGS. In academic research and linguistic documentation, DGS is recorded using the Hamburg Notation System (HamNoSys). SignWriting also maintains a user base within educational and transcription contexts in Germany.

== Grammar ==
The structure of German Sign Language can be formally categorized across conventional linguistic divisions: phonology, morphology, morphosyntax, and syntax.

=== Phonology ===
Signs are composed through simultaneous combinations of features across four primary parameters: handshape, hand orientation, location, and movement. Altering a single feature within a parameter can yield a distinct sign, establishing minimal pair contrasts. DGS utilizes 32 distinct handshapes, including the six universal basic handshapes observed across signed languages.

Two-handed signs adhere to strict phonotactic rules:

- Rule of symmetry: If both hands move simultaneously, they must share identical handshapes and movement patterns.
- Rule of dominance: If the hands assume different handshapes, only the dominant hand executes movement while the non-dominant hand remains static as an articulation base.

Uninflected lexical signs in DGS consist of at most two syllables. Syllables are structured around two structural timing slots: Hold (H) and Movement (M). Syllabic patterns occur as M (minimal syllable), HM, MH, or HMH (maximal syllable). The syllable structure H in isolation is phonotactically prohibited.

Lexical signs frequently incorporate non-manual features such as eye movements, mouth gestures, facial expressions, head movements, and torso posture. Approximately 25% of lexical signs require mandatory non-manual components. Mouth movements matching spoken word components are termed mouthing.

=== Syntax ===
==== Clause structure ====
===== Unmarked word order =====
The basic unmarked word order in DGS is subject–object–verb (SOV).

[PRON]_{2} ARBEIT SUCH-
you work search
subject object verb
'You are looking for a job.'

[PRON]_{1} BROT _{1}GEB-_{2}[cl:Brot]
I bread _{I-}give_{-you(-something-bread-shaped)}
Subject Object Verb
'I give you (the) bread.'

Indirect objects systematically precede direct objects within the clause structure.

[PRON]_{1} {[POSS]_{1} VATER_{3}} BROT _{1}GEB-_{3}[cl:Brot]
I {my father} bread _{I-}give_{-him(-something-bread-shaped)}
Subject {indirect object} {direct object} verb
'I give my father (the) bread.'

In verbal complexes containing auxiliary or modal verbs, the auxiliary element follows the lexical verb.

[PRON]_{2} ARBEIT SUCH- MÜSS-
you work search must
Subject object {"full verb"} "auxiliary"
'You have to look for a job.'

[PRON]_{1} RADFAHR- KÖNN-NICHT
I ride-a-bike cannot
Subject {"full verb"} "auxiliary"
'I can't ride a bike.'

[PRON]_{1} KOMM- VERSUCH-
I come try
Subject {"full verb"} "auxiliary"
'I'll try to come.'

[PRON]_{1} WOHNUNG PUTZ- KEINE-LUST-HAB-
I apartment clean can't-be-bothered
Subject Object {"full verb"} "Modalverb"
'I can't be bothered cleaning the apartment.'

Animate referents unindexed by verb agreement can be marked using the Personal Agreement Marker (PAM). PAM marks spatial loci and functions as an auxiliary sign placed after the main verb. The Benefactive Marker (BEM) follows an identical distribution.

[PRON]_{1} LIEB- [PAM]_{2}
I love you
Subject {"full verb"} "auxiliary"
'I love you.'

[PRON]_{1} ARZT_{3} LIEB- [PAM]_{3}
I doctor love him/her
Subject Object {"full verb"} "auxiliary"
'I love the doctor.'

[PRON]_{1} BUCH KAUF- [BEM]_{2}
I book buy for-you
Subject object {"full verb"} "auxiliary"
'I bought a book for you.'

Temporal adverbials establish clause-level topics and occupy clause-initial position.

GESTERN FRAU_{3} {[POSS]_{1} SCHWESTER_{4}} BUCH _{3}GEB-_{4}[cl:Buch]
yesterday woman {my sister} book _{she}-give_{-her(-something-book-shaped)}
Time Subject {Indirect object} {Direct object} Verb
'Yesterday a/the woman gave my sister a/the book.'

Locative expressions follow temporal adverbials at the beginning of the clause.

GESTERN {UNIVERSITÄT [LOK]_{A}} [PRON]1 {MANN NETT} KENNENLERN-
yesterday {university there} I {man nice} meet
Time Location Subject Object Verb
'I met a nice man at the university yesterday.'

This spatial ordering adheres to the Figure–Ground Principle, placing large, stationary references before smaller, movable figures.

WALD_{A} HAUS STEH-_{in-A}[cl:Haus]
forest house _{house-shaped-object-}is-situated-_{there}
Ground Figure Verb
'There is a house in the forest.'

Sentence-level adverbs occur clause-initially.

HOFF [PRON]_{3} HUND KAUF-
hope s/he dog buy
{Sentence adverb} Subject Object Verb
'Hopefully s/he'll buy a dog.'

Verb-modifying adverbs lacking manual expression occur in separate trailing adverbial clauses.

{[POSS]_{1} CHEF} TANZ-, SCHÖN
{my boss} dance beautiful
Subject Verb {Adverbial clause}
'My boss dances beautifully.'

Wh-interrogatives systematically occur clause-finally following the verb.

[PRON]_{2} BESTELL- WÜNSCH- WAS
you order desire what
Subject {"full verb"} "auxiliary" Wh
'What would you like to order?'

[PRON]_{2} D-G-S LERN- WÜNSCH- WARUM
you DGS learn desire why
Subject object {"full verb"} "auxiliary" Wh
'Why do you want to learn DGS?'

[PRON]_{2} {SOZIAL WISSENSCHAFT} STUDIER- ANFANG- WANN
du {social sciences} study-at-university begin when
Subject Object {"full verb"} "auxiliary" Wh
'How long have you been studying social sciences at university?'

Negative lexical elements occupy clause-final position when emphasized.

[PRON]_{1} {[POSS]_{2} GELIEBTE(R)} KENNENLERN- NOCH-NICHT
ich {your partner} meet not-yet
Subject Object Verb Negation
'I haven't met your partner yet.'

[PRON]_{1} ESS- WÜNSCH- NICHTS
I eat desire nothing
Subject {"full verb"} "auxiliary" negation
'I don't want to eat anything at all.'

Unemphasized negation remains in its default pre-verbal or pre-auxiliary position.

[PRON]_{1} NICHTS ESS- WÜNSCH-
I nothing eat desire
Subject object {"full verb"} "auxiliary"
'I don't want to eat anything.'

Determiners (demonstratives, quantifiers, relative indicators) follow the noun head.

BUCH [DEM]_{A}
book this
Noun Determiner
'this book'

Attributive adjectives follow the noun head directly.

BUCH NEU
book new
Noun Adjective
'a/the new book'

DGS lacks a overt copular verb (to be). Predicative adjectives are typically separated from the noun head by a demonstrative or determiner.

BUCH [DEM]_{A} NEU
book this new
Noun Determiner Adjective
'This book is new.'

BUCH NEU [DEM]_{A}
book new this
Noun Adjective Determiner
'this new book'

Possessive adjectives occupy a medial position between the possessor and the possessed entity.

MANN_{3} [POSS]_{3} AUTO
man his car
Possessor Possessive Possession
'the man's car'

LETZTE-WOCHE {[POSS]_{1} VATER_{3} [POSS]_{3} HAUS [LOK]_{A}} [PRON]_{2} {[POSS]_{1} MUTTER_{4}} GELD _{2}GEB-_{4} WÜNSCH- WARUM
last-week {my father his house there} you {my mother} money _{you-}give_{-her} desire why
Time Location Subject {Indirect object} {Direct object} {"full verb"} "auxiliary" Wh
'Why did you want to give my mother money at my father's house last week?'

===== Marked sentences =====
Displaced elements (topicalized or focused phrases) require accompanying non-manual markers, such as raised eyebrows or head tilts.

{eyebrows raised} {} {head shake}
{FRAU [DEM]_{A}} {[PRON]_{1}} MÖG-
{woman that} I _{don't-}like
{Topicalised object} Subject Verb
'That woman, I don't like.'

[PRON]_{1} ITALIEN LIEBHAB-
I Italy adore
Subject Object Verb
'I love Italy.'

{eyebrows raised} {} {} {}
LAND [PRON]_{1} ITALIEN LIEBHAB-
country I Italy adore
Topic Subject Object Verb
'My favourite country is Italy.'

{eyebrows raised} {} {} {}
ESSEN [PRON]_{1} ITALIEN LIEBHAB-
food I Italy adore
Topic Subject Object Verb
'My favourite food is Italian.'
