= Macedonians in Hungary =

Macedonians who fled to Hungry after the Greek Civil War

Macedonians in Hungary Македонци во Унгарија Makedónok Magyarországon
Total population
- 5,000 (est.)

Regions with significant populations
- Budapest

Languages
- Primarily Macedonian and Hungarian

Religion
- Macedonian Orthodox Church

Related ethnic groups
- Macedonians

Macedonians in Hungary (in Macedonian: Македонци во Унгарија, Hungarian: Makedónok Magyarországon) refers to the ethnic Macedonian minority residing in today's Republic of Hungary. After the Greek Civil War, many Macedonians were evacuated to Hungary. Many left from the Socialist Republic of Macedonia in the 1950s and 1960s. A substantial minority remained of the 7,253 who fled Greece. An estimated 5,000 Macedonians lived in Hungary in 1995. Most of the Macedonian population is present in the country's capital - Budapest.

== See also ==
- Hungary–North Macedonia relations
- Ethnic groups in Hungary
- Macedonians
- Macedonian language
- Republic of North Macedonia
