= Sieradians =

Ethnographic group of Polish people

Sieradzanie (Polish)
- The historical coat of arms of the Sieradz Voivodeship.

Regions with significant populations
- Poland (Łódź Voivodeship)

Languages
- Polish (standard dialect, Lesser Poland dialect)

Religion
- Roman Catholicism

Related ethnic groups
- Poles

Sieradians (Note: Polish: Sieradzanie) is an ethnographic group of Polish people that originate from the historical region of Sieradz Land, located within borders of the Łódź Voivodeship, Poland. The group does not express much cultural separateness from other Poles. Historically, the group has been heavily inflected by the neighboring groups of Silesians, Greater Poland people, and Lesser Poland people.
