= Walloons in the Netherlands =

The history and presence of the Walloon people, i.e. francophone Belgians, in the Netherlands goes back to the foundation process of the Dutch state. Even more so, the region now known as Wallonia was part of the historical Southern Netherlands, a region now divided between the Netherlands, Belgium and the French Nord-Pas-de-Calais.

== Walloons in the Meuse-Rhine Region ==
However, even after the foundation of the previously mentioned nations cross-border migration continued towards the Netherlands. Particularly, this was the case in the border area now of the Netherlands (Limburg province), Belgium (Limburg and Liège provinces) and Germany (North Rhine-Westphalia). In 1840, 10 years after the independence and incorporation of Wallonia into Belgium, the population of the Dutch Limburgian capital Maastricht comprised 8.6% Belgian-born persons with 40% of these persons originating from Wallonia fuelling the competition between the Dutch and French languages in the city.
