= Swiss-German Sign Language =

Sign language of Switzerland

- DSGS; Schweizerdeutsche Gebärdensprache; Langue des Signes Suisse-Allemande; Lingua dei Segni Svizzero-Tedesca; Germani Helvetti Language
- Native to: Switzerland, Liechtenstein
- Signers: 5,500 (2010)
- Language family: possibly French or German SL: Swiss-German Sign Language
- Writing system: SignWriting

Language codes
- ISO 639-3: sgg
- Glottolog: swis1240
- ELP: Swiss-German Sign Language

Swiss-German Sign Language (German: Deutschschweizer Gebärdensprache, abbreviated DSGS) is the primary deaf sign language of the German-speaking part of Switzerland and of Liechtenstein. The language was established around 1828. In 2011 it was estimated that 7,500 deaf and 13,000 hearing people use DSGS. There are six dialects which developed in boarding schools for the deaf in Zürich, Bern, Basel, Lucerne, and St. Gallen, as well as in Liechtenstein.

== Name ==
In Switzerland, the language is called Gebärdensprache (sign language) if a distinction from other languages is not required. Some sources call it Natürliche Gebärden or Natürliche Gebärdensprache, or Swiss Sign Language (Langage gestuel suisse). The former just means 'natural sign', like those for "sleep" or "eat", in contrast to Abstrakte Gebärden 'conceptual sign', and so the term is no longer used. Most English sources today use the term German-Swiss Sign Language or Swiss-German Sign Language.

== Classification ==
Wittmann (1991) suspects that Swiss-German Sign Language may be part of the French Sign Language family, but it is not close and this is not easy to demonstrate.

In Switzerland, the parentage of this language is still in research. Research on whether DSGS could be a derivative of the German Sign Language (DGS) is planned, but it was observed that DSGS signers are often more open to borrowing loan signs from LSF-SR, the French Sign Language dialect of the Suisse Romande, and less from the DGS.

== Literature ==
Two books have been published in SignWriting.

== Manual alphabet ==
The manual alphabet is similar to that of German Sign Language and American Sign Language, but with the following differences:

- For F, the upright fingers are parallel/in contact
- For T, the index finger lies atop the tip of the thumb (an X with the thumb underneath), as commonly found in other alphabets
- Informally, X uses the thumb, like C with just the index finger
- Ä is like A, but the thumb moves out and back a couple times
- Ö is like O, but it opens to a C shape and closes again a couple times (formally, the index finger remains in contact with the thumb)
- Ü is like U, but the fingers bend down (as the index is in an X or T) a couple times
- SCH is as in DGS
- There is also a CH, which is a C formed with the fingers of H (thumb, index and middle)
- There is no ẞ, as that is rendered SS in Switzerland.
