= Chechens in Austria =

Total population
- ~30,000 – 40,000 (2019)

Languages
- Austrian German, Chechen, Russian

Religion
- Sunni Islam

Chechens in Austria are Austrian citizens of Chechen descent and Chechen refugees living in Austria.

== Notable Chechens of Austria ==
- Mairbek Taisumov — MMA fighter, signed in the UFC
