= Irreligion in Montenegro =

Irreligious Montenegrins
Total population
- Population in Montenegro: 620,029; Not religious or spiritual: 7,667 (2011)

Regions with significant populations
- Podgorica, Herceg Novi, Kotor, Tivat

Religions
- Irreligion (Including agnosticism, atheism, deism, skepticism, freethought/freethinker, secular humanism, ignosticism, apatheism, Nonbeliever, nontheism, rationalism)

Religion in Montenegro (2011)
1. Eastern Orthodoxy (72.1%)
2. Catholic (3.44%)
3. Other Christian (0.43%)
4. Islam (19.1%)
5. Other religions (1.04%)
6. Atheist/Agnostic (1.31%)
7. Undeclared (2.61%)

Irreligion in Montenegro refers in its narrowest sense to agnosticism, atheism, secular humanism, and general secularism. Increase of the number of irreligious people is usually interpreted by the modernization marked with tendency of secularization and the progress of science and technology that directly affect human society.

The majority of Montenegro's population, 98.69%, declares to belong to a religion, though observance of their declared religion may vary widely.

On the census from 2011, atheists, those who declared no religion, comprised about 1.24% of the whole population, and agnostics 0.07%.

Religiosity is lowest in the Bay of Kotor region and the capital city of Podgorica.

Municipalities with highest share of atheists are Herceg Novi (2.43%), Kotor (2.03%), Podgorica (1.99%) and Tivat (1.7%). In contrast, Rožaje has the fewest atheists, who make up only 0.01% of its population.

== See also ==
- Religion in Montenegro
