= Montenegrins =

South Slavic ethnic group

Crnogorci Црногорци

Total population
- 300,000

Regions with significant populations
- Montenegro: 256,436 (2023 census) (Note: The term Montenegrins in a wider sense can also be used to denote all the peoples from Montenegro (population of 623,633), regardless of their ethnic and religious affiliation.)
- Diaspora
- Argentina: c. 80,000 (2024)
- Germany: c. 30,000 (2014)
- France: c. 30,000
- Serbia: 20,238 (2022)
- Luxembourg: c. 12,000 (2014)
- Chile: c. 7,000 (2015)
- Italy: 4,588 (2010)
- Canada: 4,160 (2016)
- Croatia: 3,127 (2021)
- Netherlands: 2,721 (2022)
- Slovenia: 2,667 (2002)
- Switzerland: 2,593 (2014)
- United States: 2,528 (2000)
- Bolivia: c. 2,000 (2017)
- Paraguay: c. 2,000 (2018)
- Bosnia and Herzegovina: 1,883 (2013)
- Australia: 1,554 (2013)
- Sweden: 1,551 (2022)
- United Kingdom: 1,027 (2011)
- North Macedonia: 1,023 (2011)
- Norway: 764 (2023)
- Denmark: 684 (2023)
- Albania: 511 (2023)
- Russia: 181 (2010)
- Belgium: 129 (2010)
- Brazil: 112 (2024)

Languages
- Montenegrin, Serbian

Religion
- Predominantly Orthodox Christianity also Catholicism and Islam

Related ethnic groups
- Serbs and other South Slavs

Montenegrins (Montenegrin: Crnogorci / Црногорци, lit. 'People of the Black Mountain', pronounced [tsr̩nǒɡoːrtsi] or [tsr̩noɡǒːrtsi]) are a South Slavic ethnic group native to the country of Montenegro. They share a common culture, ancestry, history, and speak the Montenegrin language.

Montenegrins are mostly Orthodox Christians; however, the population also includes Catholics, Muslims and irreligious people. The Montenegrin language is the official language of Montenegro.

Historically, the Montenegrin nation comprised many tribes. Most tribes formed in the 15th and 16th centuries, about the time when the Ottoman Empire established its control of the medieval state of Zeta. Today, the tribes are mainly studied within the frameworks of social anthropology and family history, as they have not been used in official structures since the time (1852–1910) of the Principality of Montenegro; however, some tribal regions overlap with contemporary municipal areas. The kinship groups give a sense of shared identity and descent.

Outside Montenegro and Europe, Montenegrins form diaspora groups in (for example) the United States, Canada, Australia and Argentina. It is estimated that around 600,000 Montenegrin-descended people reside outside Montenegro. In 2023 a total of 44,017 Montenegrin citizens resided abroad according to the Statistical Office of Montenegro, of whom only 19.97% are ethnic Montenegrins.

== History ==
=== Middle Ages ===
Slavs settled in the Balkans during the sixth and seventh centuries. According to De Administrando Imperio, there existed three Serb polities on the territory of modern Montenegro: Duklja, roughly corresponding to the southern half; Travunia, the west; and Raška, the north. Duklja emerged as an independent state during the 11th century, initially held by the Vojislavljević dynasty; it was conquered and incorporated into the state of the Nemanjić dynasty. De Administrando Imperio does not mention which Slavic people lived in Duklja, but the state was considered to be one of the first Serb states, alongside Raška formed chiefly under the Vlastimirović and Vojislavljević dynasties respectively.

After two centuries of Nemanjić dynasty rule, southern Montenegro (Zeta) came under the rule of the Balšić noble family in the 14th century, followed later by the Crnojević noble family. By the 15th century, Zeta was more often referred to as Crna Gora (Venetian: Monte Negro). The Crnojevići were driven out from Zeta by the Ottomans and forced to retreat above the Bay of Kotor, where they built a monastery and a royal court in Cetinje, the future royal capital of Montenegro, before eventually fleeing to Venice.

=== Modern era ===
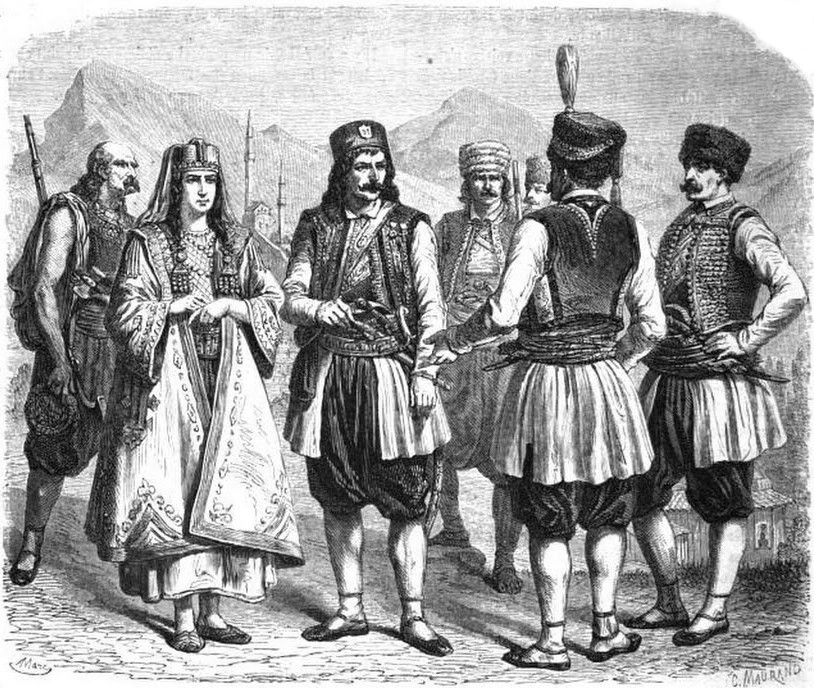
Montenegrins in 1860

For centuries following Ottoman conquests in the region, Montenegrins enjoyed de facto independence as a small and isolated theocratic state, ruled by the Metropolitans of Cetinje. Constant incursions and battle forced Montenegrin culture to become heavily warlike. Montenegrin society was divided into tribes, which met annually for a gathering (Zbor). The assembly was responsible for electing the Vladika, or Prince-Bishop, until the office was made hereditary in 1697. Montenegrin life at the time was shaped by warfare, isolation, and harsh circumstances on the barren mountain terrain, which was largely unsuitable for agriculture. Epic poetry formed the cornerstone of Montenegrin culture in the early modern era, and tales of battle, heroic deeds, and kinship were preserved in the form of poetic verse, most often recited by a guslar. Epic poetry played a central social role that transmitted tribal history and collective memory across generations.

Montenegrins on guard by Anton Karinger, 1869

The annexation of the Kingdom of Montenegro on 13 November 1918 gained international recognition at the Conference of Ambassadors in Paris, held on 13 July 1922. Less than a month later, Montenegro became part of the newly-formed Kingdom of Serbs, Croats and Slovenes.

Flag of Montenegro

Although Montenegrins comprised one of the smallest ethnic groups in Yugoslavia (2.5% in 1971), they were the most overrepresented ethnic group in the Yugoslav bureaucracy, military, and communist party organs. In the Yugoslav People's Army, 29.7% of general officers were ethnic Montenegrins as of 1953. Among party elites, Montenegrins made up 16% to 21% of senior officials throughout the existence of communist Yugoslavia, and comprised a similar portion of the state's diplomatic corps. Montenegrins were over-represented among Yugoslavia's elite, largely due to the pre-war strength of the Communist Party of Montenegro, the high proportion of Montenegrins among Partisan commanders and Central Committee members during the war, and a historically militaristic culture. During this period, ethnic Montenegrins also held about 15% of senior government jobs in Yugoslavia. Montenegrin overrepresentation also occurred on a republic-level. For example, despite comprising less than 4% of the population of Kosovo, Montenegrins represented nearly 30% of state security personnel in the province. Montenegrins also had a disproportionately large representation among federal elected officials and judicial organs.

== Language ==
In the census held in 2023, 71.4% of ethnic Montenegrins in Montenegro declared Montenegrin as their native language, 22.9% declared Serbian and 2.9% declared Serbo-Croatian.

== Religion ==
Most Ethnic Montenegrins are Eastern Orthodox. A majority of them adhere to the Serbian Orthodox Church, while a minority of them adhere to the Montenegrin Orthodox Church; the latter is registered as a non-governmental organization and is canonically unrecognised by the Eastern Orthodox Church.

== Genetics ==
According to one triple analysis—autosomal, mitochondrial and paternal—of available data from large-scale studies on South Slavs and their proximal populations, the whole genome SNP data situates Montenegrins with Serbs in between two Balkan clusters. According to a 2020 autosomal marker analysis, Montenegrins are situated in between Serbs and Kosovo Albanians.

Y-DNA genetic study done in 2010 on 404 male individuals from Montenegro gave the following results: haplogroup I2a (29.7%), E-V13 (26.9%), R1b (9.4%), R1a (7.6%), I1 (6.1%), J2a1 (4.7%), J2b (4.4%), G2a (2.4%), Q (1.9%), I2b (1.7%), N (1.4%), H (1.4%), L (1.2%), and J1 (0.49%). A 2022 study on 267 samples from northeastern Montenegro found that the "most common haplogroups are I2 and R1b, both identified in 23.97% of samples, followed by E (22.47%), J2 (11.61%), I1 (6.74%), G2 (3.75%), R1a (3.37%), I1 (1.12%), G (1.12%), N (0.75%), C (0.37%), T1 (0.37%) and Q1 (0.37%)".

Montenegrins are among the tallest people in the world, with recent anthropometric studies indicating an average male height of between 182.9 and 184.09 centimeters.

== See also ==
- Culture of Montenegro
- Demographics of Montenegro
- Ethnic groups in Europe
- List of Montenegrins
- Montenegrin diaspora
- Montenegrin nationalism
- Montenegro
- Tribes of Montenegro
