= Montenegrins in Germany =

Montenegrins in Germany Crnogorci u Njemačkoj Црногорци у Њемачкој
- (Germany) (Montenegro)
- Distribution of Montenegrin citizens in Germany (2021)

Total population
- 30,000

Languages
- German, Montenegrin

Religion
- Montenegrin Orthodox, Roman Catholic, Muslim and Jewish minority

Related ethnic groups
- Other Montenegrins, Serbs in Germany

Montenegrins living in Germany (German: Montenegriner in Deutschland) are supported and represented by various associations. They number around 30,000. Some Montenegrins immigrated during the 1960s and 1970s as Gastarbeiter ("guest workers") when Montenegro was still a part of Yugoslavia. A minority arrived as refugees during the Yugoslav Wars in the 1990s.

Some Montenegrins still want to migrate to Germany, especially from the northern parts of Montenegro. In 2015, approximately 6,000 attempted to travel into Germany to seek asylum but were unsuccessful. In 2016, 683 Montenegrins were granted work permits. In 2017, this number rose to 876. In 2018, Germany made it easier for Montenegrins to gain a work permit.

== See also ==
- Germany–Montenegro relations
- Montenegrin diaspora
- Immigration to Germany
