= Orthodox Parish of Saints Constantine and Helen in Zgorzelec =

Eastern Orthodox parish in Zgorzelec, Poland

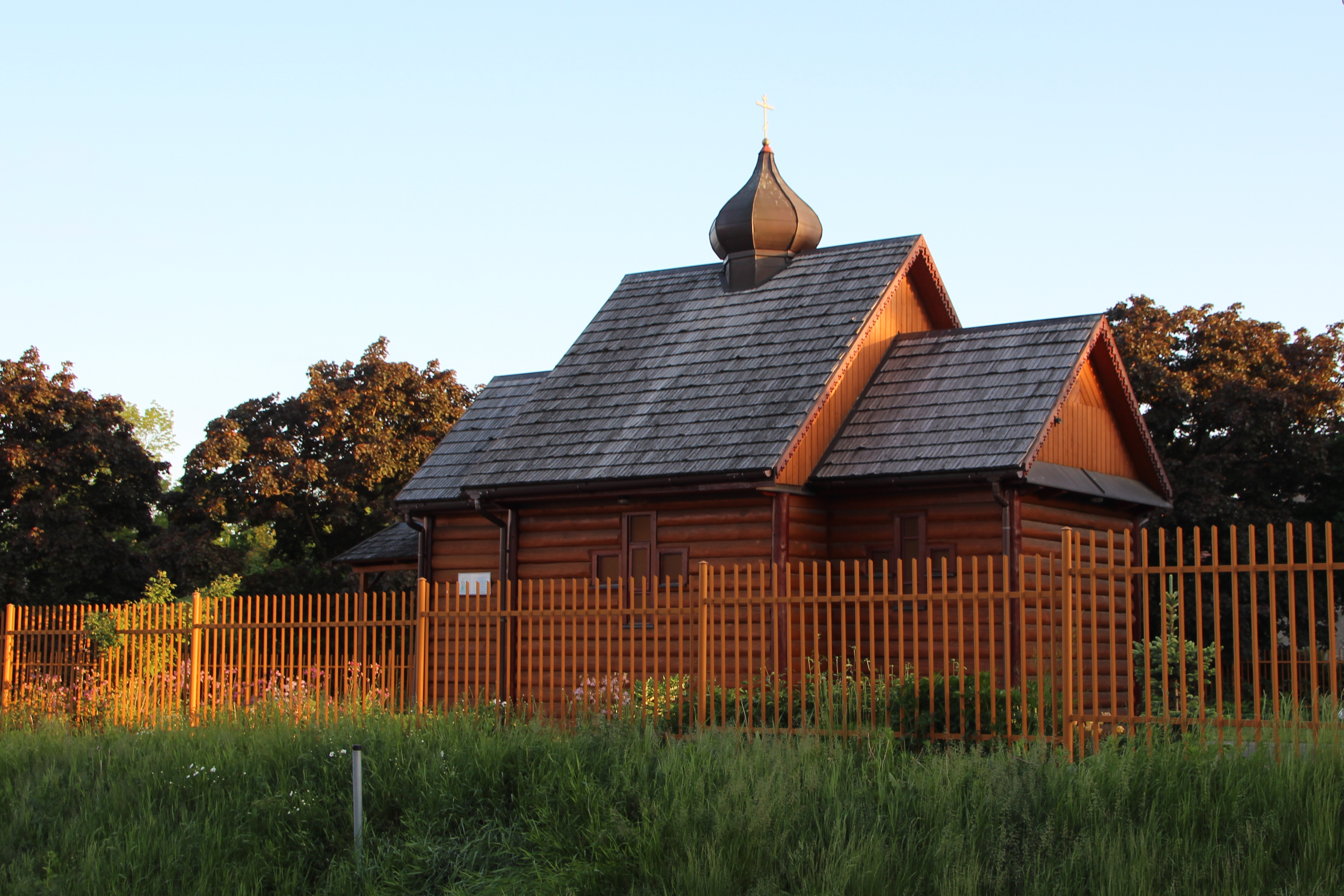
The Orthodox Church of Ss. Helen and Constantine along Lubańska Street in Zgorzelec was built in large part due to the financial support of the local Greek community.

The Orthodox Parish of Saints Constantine and Helen in Zgorzelec (Polish: Parafia Świętych Równych Apostołom Konstantyna i Heleny w Zgorzelcu; German: Heilige-Konstantin-und-Helena-Kirche) – is an Orthodox Christian parish in Zgorzelec, in the Archdiocese of Wrocław and Szczecin. The parish has been functioning since 2002.

== History ==
=== Spiritual predecessors ===
The first followers of the Orthodox church in the vicinity of today's Zgorzelec and Görlitz appeared in the 17th century. These were Greek merchants as well as refugees from the former lands of the Byzantine Empire. They rented a chapel in one of the local churches, in which they founded the Saint George's Orthodox church. It is unknown how long this Orthodox parish functioned.

The next Orthodox church dates to the World War I, when the German authorities imprisoned 6,000 members of the Hellenic Army. Army chaplains were among those imprisoned, and they adapted one of the barracks into an Orthodox church. A legacy of those prisoners still visible today is the Greek Army cemetery in Görlitz, among them the grave of Father Michailis Dimitrios.

=== Greek and Macedonian settlement in Zgorzelec ===
Greek and Macedonian refugees from the Greek Civil War were resettled in Zgorzelec in 1949. There were Orthodox clergy among those who had been relocated here, some of whom connected with the Polish Autocephalous Orthodox Church. One of them, Fr. Tsaldikas, was authorized in 1955 to begin holding Greek language services in Jelenia Góra. The local communist authorities however, would not allow for the creation of a new Orthodox parish in Zgorzelec.

=== Parish founding and church construction ===
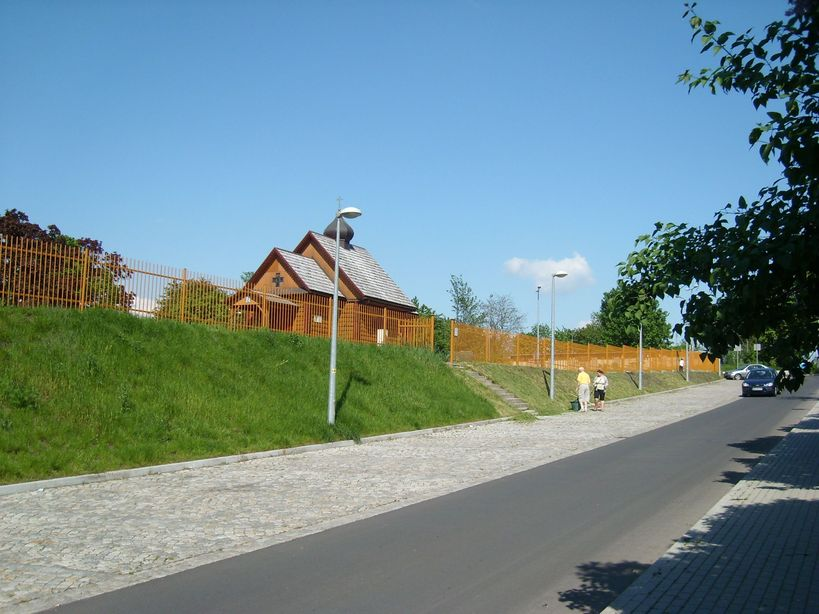
The wooden chapel of the Orthodox Parish of Saints Constantine and Helen in Zgorzelec.

Although over the decades the Greek community in Zgorzelec diminished as people returned to Greece, the many years of effort for the authorization of a new local Orthodox congregation came to fruition at the beginning of the 21st century.

Jeremiasz, the Orthodox archbishop of Wrocław and Szczecin consecrated the modest traditional wooden Orthodox chapel on May 29, 2002, while he formally erected the new parish on October 18 of that year. Fr. Marek Bonifatiuk was announced as the pastor.

The church was renovated at the end of 2003 to fix certain flaws from its initial construction, as well as to install a contemporary iconostasis which was constructed locally. The church building was moved between July 15–17, 2013 to a new larger brick structure. The new church will be composed of an upper and lower church; the patron of the lower church will be Saint George as an homage to the first Orthodox church in Görlitz from the XVII.

The parish membership stood at 10 members when it was founded; it had 63 members as of July 2013. Poles, Greeks, Macedonians, Russians, Ukrainians, Belarusians, as well as Bulgarians living in Zgorzelec County and Görlitz attend services at the church.

== Bibliography ==
- Kalendarz Prawosławny 2017, Wydanie Warszawskiej Metropolii Prawosławnej, ISSN 1425-2171, s.190
- Hierarchia i kler kościoła prawosławnego w granicach II Rzeczypospolitej i Polski powojennej w XIX–XXI wieku, ks. Grzegorz Sosna i m. Antonina Troc-Sosna, Ryboły 2012
