= Macedonian diaspora =

Community of Macedonian emigrants

Macedonian diaspora in the world (includes people with Macedonian ancestry or citizenship). North Macedonia + 100,000 + 10,000 + 1,000

The Macedonian diaspora (Macedonian: Македонска дијаспора, romanized: Makedonska dijaspora) consists of ethnic Macedonian emigrants and their descendants in countries such as Australia, Italy, the United Kingdom, Germany, New Zealand, Canada, the United States and others. A 1964 estimate put the number of Macedonian emigrants at over 580,000.

== History ==
The Macedonian diaspora is the consequence of either voluntary departure or forced migration over the past 100 years. It is claimed that there were six major waves of emigration. The Macedonian Slavic-speaking immigrants in the first half of 20th century were considered and identified as Bulgarians or Macedonian Bulgarians. Many Macedonian Bulgarians came to the United States. Several immigrants identified also as Macedonians, however the designation was used then mainly regionally. The sense of belonging to a separate Macedonian nation gained credence after World War II, following the establishment of the People's Republic of Macedonia within the People's Federal Republic of Yugoslavia and the codification of a distinct Macedonian language.

The first wave occurred after the failure of the Ilinden Uprising in 1903. Many people fled to other parts of Ottoman Empire, Bulgaria, Russia, the United States and Canada.

The "Pečalba" (seasonal work) tradition was common across the Macedonian region. Many people settled in the host countries. The pečalbari emigrated from the 1880s to the 1920s, mainly to Greece. Large settlements occurred in Canada, Brazil, Argentina, Turkey and the United States.

The period from World War I to the Great Depression, when Macedonians fled Serbian rule and moved to Western Europe for industrial labor jobs, mainly in such countries as France, West Germany, Belgium and the Netherlands, which was repeated in the early 1950s to late 1970s.

After World War II and the Greek Civil War, thousands of Macedonians fled, were evacuated or emigrated. Thousands of people fled from Greece after the failure of the DSE, the National Liberation Front and the Communist Party of Greece (KKE) to win the Greek Civil War, including a number of Slavic speakers of Greek Macedonia. An estimated 55,000 people were evacuated to Romania, the Soviet Union, Czechoslovakia, Poland and the rest of the Eastern Bloc.

During the 1960s, Yugoslavia lifted restrictions on emigration. Hundreds of thousands of Macedonians emigrated. Internal Yugoslav migration (Serbia) was also very prevalent, by 1991 an estimated 80,000 Macedonians were living throughout Yugoslavia. Primary destinations were Australia, Chile, France, Germany, Italy, New Zealand, Norway, Spain, Sweden, Switzerland and the United States.

After the breakup of Yugoslavia thousands of Macedonians emigrated. Many went to Germany, Italy, Switzerland, the UK and North America.

== Number of ethnic Macedonians around the world ==
	Country	Number of Ethnic Macedonians	Main Article	Description
1	Albania	4,697 (1989 census) – 35,000 (est.)	Macedonians in Albania	Although not necessarily classified as being a part of the "Macedonian diaspora", the Macedonians in Albania constitute a minority group in Albania.
2	Argentina	30,000 (est.)	Macedonian Argentine	Many Macedonians of Argentina are the descendants of the "pečalbari" (seasonal workers) who came to Argentina in the early 20th century. Many decided to stay in Argentina, setting up Macedonian colonies in the Pampas and other regions. Most Macedonians can be found in Buenos Aires, the Pampas and Córdoba. An estimated 30,000 Macedonians can be found in Argentina.
3	Australia	111,352 (2021 census) -200.000 (est.)	Macedonian Australians	The Macedonians in Australia comprise many refugees from the Greek Civil War. Although the majority are from the Republic of Macedonia having migrated to Australia from the 1960s to the early 1990s. The Republic of Macedonia claims that there are 200,000 Macedonians in Australia. Demographer Charles Price puts the number of Macedonians in Australia at over 150,000 people. In the 2021 Census, 41,786 Australian residents are listed as having been born in the Republic of Macedonia. In addition, 111,352 residents declared their ancestry as Macedonian, either alone or in combination with another ancestry. In 2001, the Macedonian language was spoken at home by 71,994 residents. The 2011 census recorded 93,570 people of Macedonian ancestry.
4	Austria	13,696 (2001 census)^{1} – 25,000 (est.)	Macedonians in Austria	Thousand of Macedonians emigrated to Austria during the years of the Yugoslav federation. Many were temporary workers. After the Breakup of Yugoslavia many returned to Macedonia but a large proportion of the minority remained. In recent years migration to Austria has increased. By 2001 there were 13,696 Macedonian citizens in Austria, however the Macedonian government puts the figure at 15,000.
5	Belgium	3,419^{1} – 15,406
6	Brazil	45,000 (est.)	Macedonians in Brazil	An estimated 45,000 people in Brazil are of Macedonian Ancestry. Many Pečalbari (seasonal workers) came to Brazil in the early 1900s looking for work. Many of them stayed and established themselves in Brazil. The Macedonians in Brazil can be found in Porto Alegre, Rio de Janeiro and Curitiba. Many of the descendants no longer speak the Macedonian language.
7	Bulgaria	1,143 people (2021 census)	Ethnic Macedonians in Bulgaria or Pirin Macedonians
8	Canada	37,705 (2006 census) – 200,000 (est.)	Macedonian Canadians	The Macedonian Community of Canada is one of the largest and oldest Macedonian diaspora groups in the world. Many refugees from the Balkan Wars and World War I emigrated to Canada in the early 20th century. They were joined by Aegean Macedonians in the 1920s and 1930s. Another wave of refugees arrived after World War II. Many emigrants from Aegean Macedonia began to arrive in the 1950s and 1960s joined by Yugoslav Macedonians.
9	Czech Republic	2,068 citizens of RM (2009 census), 13–15,000 (2001 estimate)	Macedonians in the Czech Republic	The Macedonians in the Czech Republic are mainly descended from the refugee children who were resettled in the former Czechoslovakia. It was estimated that 11,623 people were resettled in Czechoslovakia. Many later decided to return to the Socialist Republic of Macedonia, which sharply reduced the community's numbers. Although Many decided to stay in the Czech Republic.
10	Denmark	3,349 (2008 census)^{1} – 12,000 (est.)	Macedonians in Denmark
11	Finland	8,963
12	France	2,300 – 15,000(est.)	Macedonians in France	The French government estimates the number of Macedonians in France to be 2,300 while Macedonian figures put the number at over 15,000 persons.
13	Germany	62,295 (2006 figures)^{1} –117,969(est.)	Macedonians in Germany	Many Macedonians came to Germany in the 1960s and 1970s. Many went to work in the industrial centres of East Germany and the Ruhr. Later still many thousands emigrated to Germany after the Breakup of Yugoslavia. The first of eight Macedonian Orthodox Church communities was established in Hamburg in 1980. The Macedonian Soccer team FK Makedonija 1970 was founded in 1970. There are concentrations of Macedonians in Berlin, Bavaria, Hamburg and the Ruhr. 62,295 Macedonian citizens were living in Germany in 2006, although Macedonian sources claim the true number of Macedonians ranges from 75,000 to 85,000.
14	Greece	962 (2001 census) to 10,000–30,000 (1999 est.)	Slavic speakers of Greek Macedonia	As of 1 January 2010, there are 1,705 citizens from the Republic of Macedonia with a residency permit in Greece.
15	Hungary	5,000 (est.)	Macedonians in Hungary	After the Greek Civil War many Macedonians were evacuated to Hungary. Many left for the Socialist Republic of Macedonia in the 1950s and 1960s. Although a substantial minority remained of the 7,253 who fled Greece. An estimated 5,000 Macedonians resided in Hungary in 1995.
16	Italy	78,090 (2007 figures)^{1}		The largest population of Macedonian Muslims in the Macedonian diaspora can be found Italy. Many of them are from the Debar, Gostivar, Struga and Mavrovo regions of Macedonia. Next to the Macedonian Muslims there is also a large population of Macedonian Christians. The total number of Macedonian citizens in Italy has risen from 34,019 in 2003 to 78,090 in 2007.
17	Luxembourg	200
18	Netherlands	10,000 – 15,000 (est.)		Many Macedonians entered the Netherlands during the 1960s and 1970s. Most of these returned to Macedonia while a minority remained. They were joined by business migrants and students after the breakup of Yugoslavia. It is estimated that over between 10,000 and 15,000 Macedonians can be found in the Netherlands.
19	New Zealand	807 2006 census^{1} – 1,500 (est.)
20	Norway	2,000
21	Poland	2,000	Macedonians in Poland	Most of the Macedonians of Poland originate from the Child Refugees of the Greek Civil War. Estimates put the number of Macedonian refugees settled in Poland at 11,458. Most Macedonians are settled in Southern and Central Poland. Many Macedonians immigrated to Poland after the breakup of Yugoslavia.
22	Portugal	310		UN 2020 estimate, Macedonian-born only
23	Romania	731 – 6,000	Macedonians of Romania	A large group of Macedonians has been present in Romania since the end of the Greek Civil War when thousands of refugees were transferred there. Many chose to remain in Romania. Today the Macedonians in Romania are a fully recognised minority group.
24	Russia	1,000 (est.)		By the 21st century an estimated 1000 Macedonians remained in Russia.
25	Slovakia	4,600 (est.)^{1}
26	Spain	200 (est.)
27	Sweden	6,000 – 15,000 (est.)	Macedonians in Sweden	Macedonians began to immigrate to Sweden after World War II. Many of these were originally Slavic speakers of Greek Macedonia who were later joined by Macedonians from Yugoslavia, a large proportion of these were Macedonian Muslims. The Macedonian population settled heavily in the south-western region of Sweden. The Swedish Government officially recognizes the Macedonian minority present in Sweden. Macedonians in Sweden are well organized through many associations and they are recognized as a Macedonian minority through law. Throughout Sweden there are over 20 registered Macedonian associations. There are several Macedonian Orthodox Churches and Macedonian language newspapers in Sweden. In 2006 there were 3,669 Macedonian born in Sweden. The Swedish immigrant center puts the number of Macedonians at 6,000. Macedonian sources put the number of Macedonians in Sweden at over 15,000.
28	Switzerland	61,304 (2006 figures)^{1} – 63,000 (est.)	Immigration from the former Yugoslavia to Switzerland	Thousand of Macedonians emigrated to Switzerland during the years of the Yugoslav federation. Many were temporary workers. After the breakup of Yugoslavia thousands more came to Switzerland. In 1992 an association of Macedonian clubs and groups was founded, the "Združenie na Makedonskite Društva" (ZMD) has member from every Macedonian society in Switzerland. By 2000 large concentrations had been established in Biel/Bienne, Bern, Geneva and Zürich. By 2005 there were 61,304 Macedonian citizens in Switzerland.
29	United Kingdom	10,000 (est.)	Macedonians in the United Kingdom	An estimated 10,000 Macedonians live in the United Kingdom. The majority of them are concentrated in the Greater London region.
30	United States	51,733 (2006 figures) – 200,000 (est.)	Macedonian Americans	Macedonians emigrated to America as "Pečalbari" (seasonal workers) in the late 19th and early 20th century. It is estimated that after the failure of the Ilinden Uprising, over 50,000 Macedonians came to America. The first immigrants were primarily from the Lerin, Kostur, and Bitola regions. After World War I, many Macedonians returned to Europe only to be joined by Macedonians who were fleeing persecution under the Metaxas regime. By 1945, an estimated 40,000 to 50,000 Macedonians were in the United States. Post-war immigration was limited until the Breakup of Yugoslavia. Large Macedonian concentrations can be found in Detroit (20,000), Gary, Chicago, and northern New Jersey. The 1990 census recorded 20,365 Macedonians. By 2006, this number had increased to 42,812. The United Macedonian Diaspora was established by Macedonian Americans real Macedonians who live and work in USA with their establishment are also present in the United States
	(Socialist Federal Republic of Yugoslavia) Former Yugoslavia	65,000 (est.)		While Macedonia was part of the former Yugoslavia, thousands of Macedonians resettled in other constituent republics. Many settled there permanently although most were temporary migrants. By 1980 there were large Macedonian population in every major city of the former Yugoslavia. Over 60,000 Macedonians were scattered throughout the rest of Yugoslavia by 1991.
31	(Bosnia and Herzegovina) Bosnia and Hercegovina	2,278 (2005 census) – 10,000 (est.)		Many Macedonians emigrated to Bosnia and Herzegovina during the 1960s and 1970s. Many Macedonians such as Branko Crvenkovski and Stevo Teodosievski were born in Bosnia and Herzegovina. Their numbers have fluctuating from 657 in 1948, 2,297 in 1953, 3,642 in 1961 and 3,764 in 1971. In 1981 there were 2,753 Macedonians in Bosnia, this number fell to 2,278 in 2005. Most Macedonians left Bosnia and Herzegovina during the Bosnian War, many returned after the War.
32	Croatia	4,270 (2001 census) – 15,000 (est.)	Macedonians of Croatia	Macedonians have been emigrating to Croatia since the end of World War II. Their numbers have fluctuating from 1,387 in 1948, 2,385 in 1953, 4,381 in 1961 and 5,625 in 1971. In 1981 there were 6,362 Macedonians in Croatia, this number fell to 4,270 in 2001. They are an officially recognized ethnic minority in Croatia. It is claimed that up to 15,000 Macedonians live in Croatia.
33	Montenegro	819 (2003 census) – 2,500 (est.)	Macedonians in Montenegro	A small Macedonian population had existed in Montenegro since the early 1900s. By 1948 only 133 Macedonians remained in Montenegro, this number rose to 875 in 1981. 1,072 Macedonians were counted in the 1991 Yugoslav Census, this number had fallen to 819 by 2003. Macedonian was the mother language of 507 people. The Macedonians were concentrated in Podgorica, Herceg Novi and Tivat.
34	Serbia	25,847 (2002 census) – 50,000 (est.)	Macedonians in Serbia	Thousand of Macedonian joined the Partisans and fought in Serbia and the rest of Yugoslavia. Many decided to remain in Serbia. Tens of thousands of Macedonian migrants emigrated to Serbia during the years of the Yugoslav federation. Their numbers have fluctuating significantly from 17,917 in 1948, 27,277 in 1953, 36,288 in 1961 and 42,675 in 1971. In 1981 there were 48,986 Macedonians in Serbia, this number fell to 46,046 in 1991. In 2002 there were 25,847 Macedonians in Serbia. Large Macedonian centers were established in Vojvodina and Belgrade. Most notably in Pančevo, Kacarevo (19%), Jabuka (33%), Plandište (21.3%), Glogonj (12%) and Dužine (31%). By 1965 65% of Jabuka, 40% of Kacarevo and 39% of Plandište were Macedonian. Many Macedonians chose to leave Serbia after the collapse of the Yugoslav Federation. Macedonian was soon recognised as a Minority language and the Macedonians became a recognised minority. Today they enjoy full minority rights.
35	Slovenia	3,972 – 12,000 (est.)	Macedonians in Slovenia	During the years of the Yugoslav federation, many Macedonians migrated to the Socialist Republic of Slovenia. Most of them came from the east of the Socialist Republic of Macedonia and they settled mainly in the town of Kranj and the capital Ljubljana. Macedonian communities can be also found in larger towns such as Jesenice, Nova Gorica, Maribor and Celje. Around 450 Macedonians reside in the Celje region. The Macedonians are well established in Slovenia and currently have newspapers, churches, folkloric groups and many other Macedonian institutions in operation. The 1951 Yugoslav census recorded 640 Macedonians while the 1961 census recorded 1,009 Macedonians. By 1971 the number had grown to 1,613 and to 3,288 by 1981. The 1991 Yugoslav census recorded 4,371 Macedonians. The 2002 census recorded 3,972 Macedonians, while 4,760 people claimed that Macedonian was their mother language up from the 4,535 in 1991.

^{1}; This figure refers to country of birth only.

=== Cities with the most Macedonians ===
1. Melbourne, Australia: 46,233
2. Sydney, Australia: 28,916
3. Toronto, Canada: 25,245
4. Vienna, Austria: 14,074

== Diaspora organizations and political parties ==
Organizations representing ethnic Macedonians in the broader region of Macedonia outside of North Macedonia have been established. In Albania, the Macedonian Alliance for European Integration is a political party of ethnic Macedonians in Albania that has succeeded in getting Macedonians elected to local and national positions. In Bulgaria, United Macedonian Organization Ilinden–Pirin focuses on achieving human rights for ethnic Macedonians. It is part of the European Free Alliance. In Greece, Rainbow is a political party representing ethnic Macedonians. It has been participating in elections since 1994 and is also part of the European Free Alliance.

The Democratic Party of the Macedonians was established in Kosovo to represent the Macedonians of Gora. There is also an organization of Macedonian Gorani in Kosovo, led by Avnija Rahte and Ace Dimoski. The group has met with leadership from North Macedonia including Stevo Pendarovski and Zoran Zaev.

Several organizations have been established by ethnic Macedonians in the diaspora. The Macedonian Patriotic Organization (MPO) is the oldest association of Macedonian Americans and Macedonian Canadians, founded in 1922 by Macedono-Bulgarians. Its initial objective was the creation of an independent Macedonian state and now focuses on preserving the customs and traditions of Macedonians in North America. MPO's Mission Statement states "The mission of the Macedonian Patriotic Organization is to: Continue to work for human, civil and economic rights for all Macedonians of the world promote and preserve the ethnic traditions, customs and history of our people promote and develop the cultural and social growth of our youth promote and strengthen our Organization." MPO maintains a "Works for Macedonia" "The Gotse Delcheff Fund," which "allows the MPO to channel its charitable fund raising efforts into results for those in need of humanitarian assistance in Macedonia."

The Macedonian-Australian People's League existed from 1946 to 1957, reaching 53 branches in Australia. It decentralized its operations in 1957.

The United Macedonia Diaspora (UMD), the largest Macedonian diaspora organization, is an advocacy group in Washington, DC, founded in 2004. It has a global network and organizes initiatives in support of North Macedonia's constitutional name at independence, the ethnic Macedonian minorities throughout Southeast Europe, and NATO and EU integration, among other issues. It has been described as nationalist and also as ultra-nationalist.

The World Macedonian Congress (WMC) is a political organization is set up to be a parliament for ethnic Macedonians globally. Established in 1990, it is based in Skopje.

== See also ==
- Todor Petrov
- World Macedonian Congress
