= Greeks in Poland =

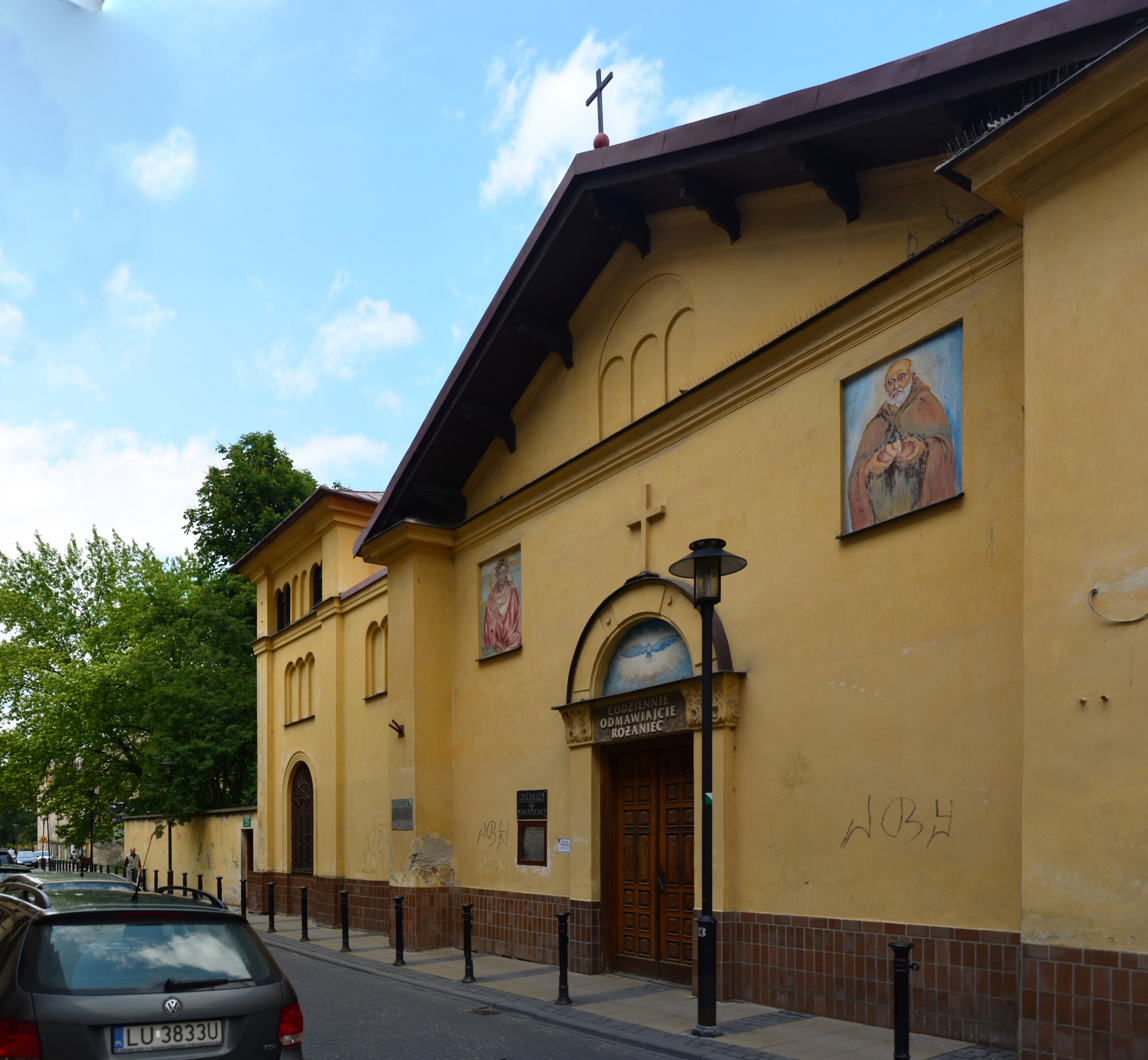
- Saint Josaphat church in Lublin, founded by Greeks in 1768

Total population
- 3600

Regions with significant populations
- Wrocław, Police, Zgorzelec, Świdnica, Ustrzyki Dolne and Bielawa.

Languages
- Greek, Polish

Religion
- Greek Orthodox Christianity

Related ethnic groups
- Greek diaspora

The Greeks in Poland (Greek: Έλληνες στην Πολωνία, romanized: Éllines stin Polonía; Polish: Grecy w Polsce) form one of the country's smaller minority groups, numbering approximately 3,600, yet their presence is attested since the Middle Ages.

== History ==
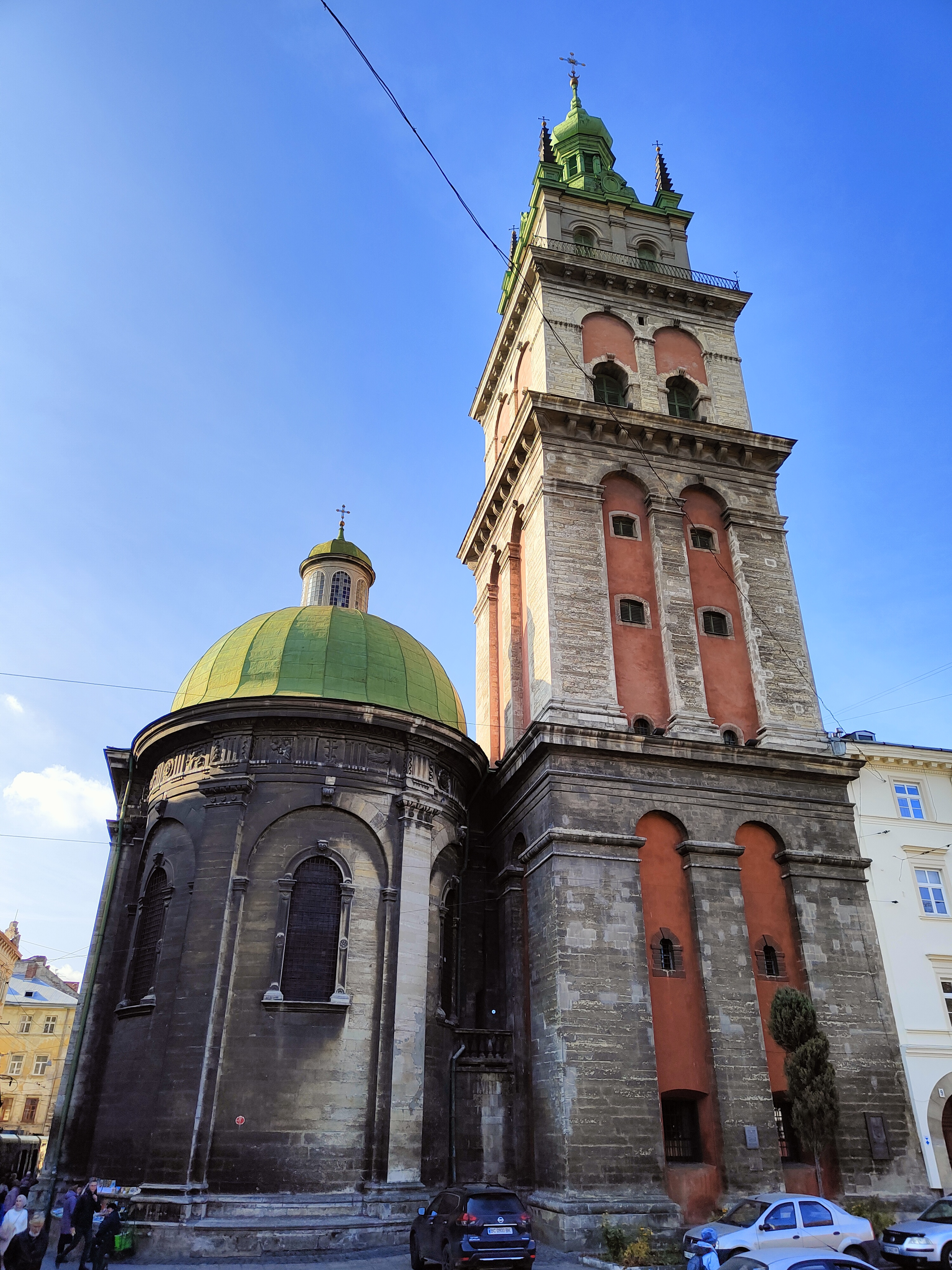
Korniakt Tower of the Dormition Church in Lwów (now Lviv), funded by Greek immigrant to Poland, wealthy merchant Konstanty Korniakt

Greeks, particularly merchants and traders, have been present in the Polish lands since the Bolesław I the Brave, funding a number of Orthodox Apostolic and in lesser extent Greek Catholic Uniat churches (e.g. in Lublin and Mohylów Podolski) and cemeteries throughout the Polish–Lithuanian Commonwealth. However most of these immigrants eventually assimilated into the diverse groups that trace their heritage from this polity such as Poles, Lithuanians, Belarusians, and Ukrainians.

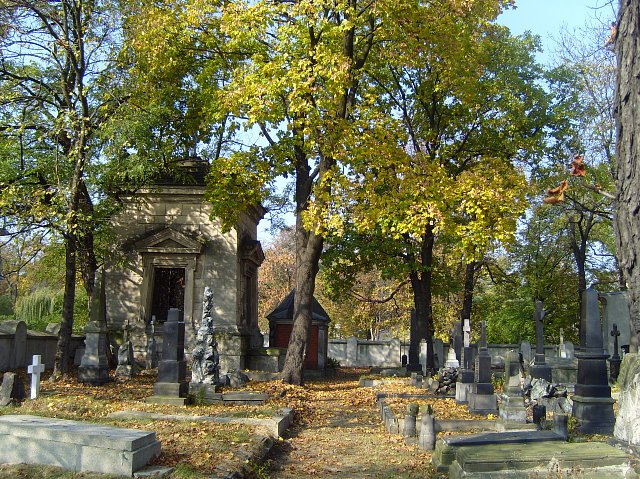
Greek Orthodox cemetery in Kalisz, founded by Greeks in 1786

In the 1921 Polish census, very few people declared Greek nationality, with the largest Greek populations of 18 and 16, based in Łódź and Warsaw, respectively.

Most self-identified Greeks in Poland today trace their heritage to the large number of Greek citizens who fled as refugees from the Greek Civil War and were admitted into Poland. They consisted largely of members of former communist partisan units from the Greek region of Macedonia. Most had been farmers before their flight from Greece. In total, from 1948 to 1951, 12,300 people from Greece came to Poland, of whom roughly one-quarter were children.

Most refugees arrived by sea through the port at Gdynia. The Polish government chose to settle them in the territories west of the Oder River near the border with East Germany, especially near Zgorzelec. The Greeks settled predominantly in the cities and towns of Zgorzelec, Bielawa, Dzierżoniów, Jelenia Góra, Legnica, Lubań, Niemcza, Świdnica, Wałbrzych and Wrocław in south-western Poland, and in Bielsko-Biała, Gdynia, Katowice, Kraków (in the Nowa Huta district), Szczecin and Warsaw. About 200 were also sent to Krościenko in the southeast, near the Bieszczady Mountains in a formerly ethnic Ukrainian area. Initially, the refugees were celebrated as anti-capitalist heroes and given significant government assistance in building new lives and integrating in Poland. Initially, they found employment on farms, for which they were well suited because of their rural background; however, they later gravitated towards urban areas.

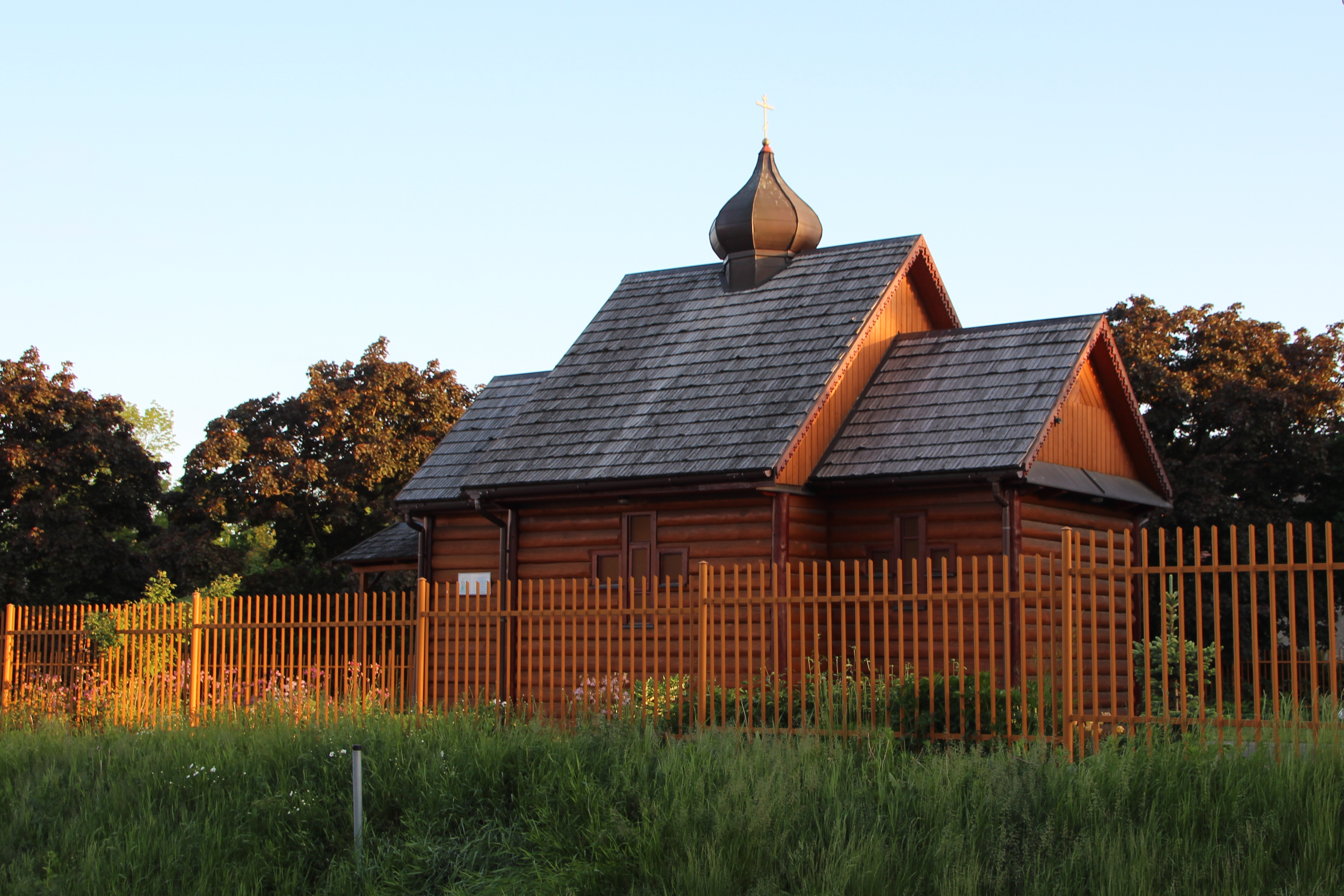
The Orthodox Church of Ss. Helen and Constantine along Lubańska Street in Zgorzelec was built in large part thanks to the support of the local Greek community.

Some refugees chose to return to Greece early on. By 1957, still roughly 10,000 remained in Poland. However, suspicions later fell on them of being Titoist agents. A large number were deported to Bulgaria in 1961. A 1985 agreement between the governments of Poland and Greece that enabled Greek refugees to receive retirement pensions at home, led to emigration back to Greece.

In 1950 the refugees from Greece were organized in the Community of Political Refugees from Greece (Polish: Gmina Demokratycznych Uchodźców Politycznych z Grecji), based in Zgorzelec. Two years later it moved to Wrocław and was renamed in 1953 Nikos Beloyannis Union of Political Refugees from Greece (Polish: Związek Uchodźców Politycznych z Grecji im. Nikosa Belojanisa). After the fall of the dictatorship in Greece it changed its name into Association of Greeks in Poland (Polish: Towarzystwo Greków w Polsce), but in 1989, an internal schism led to the creation of the Association of Macedonians in Poland (Polish: Stowarzyszenie Macedończyków w Polsce).

== Minority status ==
In his essay, published by the Helsinki Foundation for Human Rights, professor Slawomir Lodzinski states:

At present, the full legal protection is limited to this national minorities which are groups of Polish citizens, are “old”, “native” and on non-immigrant origin. This perspective has caused that the groups of Greeks [...] who have been recognized as national minorities from the 1950s, from the beginning of the 1990s are not treated as national minorities by the state.

Answering a question by Brunon Synak, President of the Kashubian-Pomeranian Association, at a meeting organized by the Council of Europe in 2002, Mr. Dobiesław Rzemieniewski, Head of the National Minorities Division in the Ministry of Internal Affairs and Administration, explained that Greeks are "not classified as national minorities since they do not meet the requirement of being traditionally domiciled on the territory of the Republic of Poland".

In 2021, political scientist and historian Stefan Dudra wrote an article "On the need to recognize the Greeks in Poland as a national minority", in the Polish journal Review of Nationalities, advocating for the government of Poland to recognize the Greeks as a national minority. Dudra concluded that:

The Greeks fulfil all the conditions set out in the Act of 2005 (Article 2, section 1, points 1-6) for the recognition of a given social group as a national minority. Among other things, they are a group smaller in number than the rest of the population of the Republic of Poland; they are significantly different from other citizens in terms of language, culture or tradition; they strive to preserve their language, culture and traditions; they are aware of their own historical ethnic community and are oriented towards expressing and protecting it, i.a., through the activities of socio-cultural associations; they are aware of their own historical ethnic community and are oriented towards expressing and protecting it, i.a., through the activities of socio-cultural associations. Their ancestors have inhabited the present territory of the Republic of Poland for at least 100 years (the Greeks have been present on Polish territory since the late Middle Ages, their ancestors inhabited Polish territory in all historical periods of the Polish state, preserving identity continuity) and they identify themselves with a nation organized in their own state. [...] Thus, they should be recognized as a national minority and listed in the Act of 2005.

== Notable people ==
- Konstanty Korniakt (c. 1517–1603), merchant
- Peter Arkoudios (c. 1562–1633), scholar and priest
- Zofia Potocka (1760–1822), courtesan and noblewoman
- Apostolis Anthimos (born 1954), jazz and rock guitarist, drummer and keyboard player
- Eleni Tzoka (born 1956), singer

== See also ==
- Greece–Poland relations
- Poles in Greece
- Refugees of the Greek Civil War in Poland
- Macedonians in Poland
- Greek diaspora
- Immigration to Poland
