= Macedonian Argentines =

Македонци во Аргентина (Macedonian) Macedonio-argentinos (Spanish)
- Flag of the Macedonian Argentines

Total population
- 30,000 (estimate)

Regions with significant populations
- The Pampas, Córdoba, Chaco, Buenos Aires

Languages
- Macedonian · Rioplatense Spanish

Religion
- Macedonian Orthodox Church; Roman Catholicism

Related ethnic groups
- Macedonians

Macedonian Argentines are Argentine citizens of Macedonian descent who reside in Argentina. Most Macedonian Argentines are descendants of ethnic Macedonians from Yugoslav Macedonia and therefore were simply known or registered as "Yugoslavs" upon entering Argentina. Argentina is home to one of the largest Macedonian communities in the Americas.

== History ==
Some Macedonian Argentines are the descendants of the "pečalbari" (seasonal workers) who came to Argentina in the early 20th century from the Ottoman Empire. Many early immigrants decided to stay in the country, setting up colonies in the Pampas and other regions. According to Sebastián Ballina's study of the Bulgarian community of Berisso and Blagovest Nyagulov's history of the Bulgarian diaspora in Latin America, most of these early immigrants identified until after World War II as Macedonian Bulgarians, or simply as Bulgarians.

During the interwar period and World War II, some Macedonians immigrants joined leftist movements, including the Communist Party. Nikola Kazandzhiev was a member of the PCA with his most active year 1931. The leftist newspaper "Macedonian voice (1935–1939)" was published in Bulgarian. The first immigrant waves which identified themselves clearly as ethnic Macedonians arrived after the war from SFR Yugoslavia. This community promoted Macedonian culture. Most Macedonians today can be found in Buenos Aires, the Pampas and Córdoba. An estimated 30,000 Macedonians live in Argentina.

== See also ==
- Macedonian Americans
- Macedonian Canadians
- Macedonian diaspora
