= Dejan Kulusevski =

Swedish footballer (born 2000)

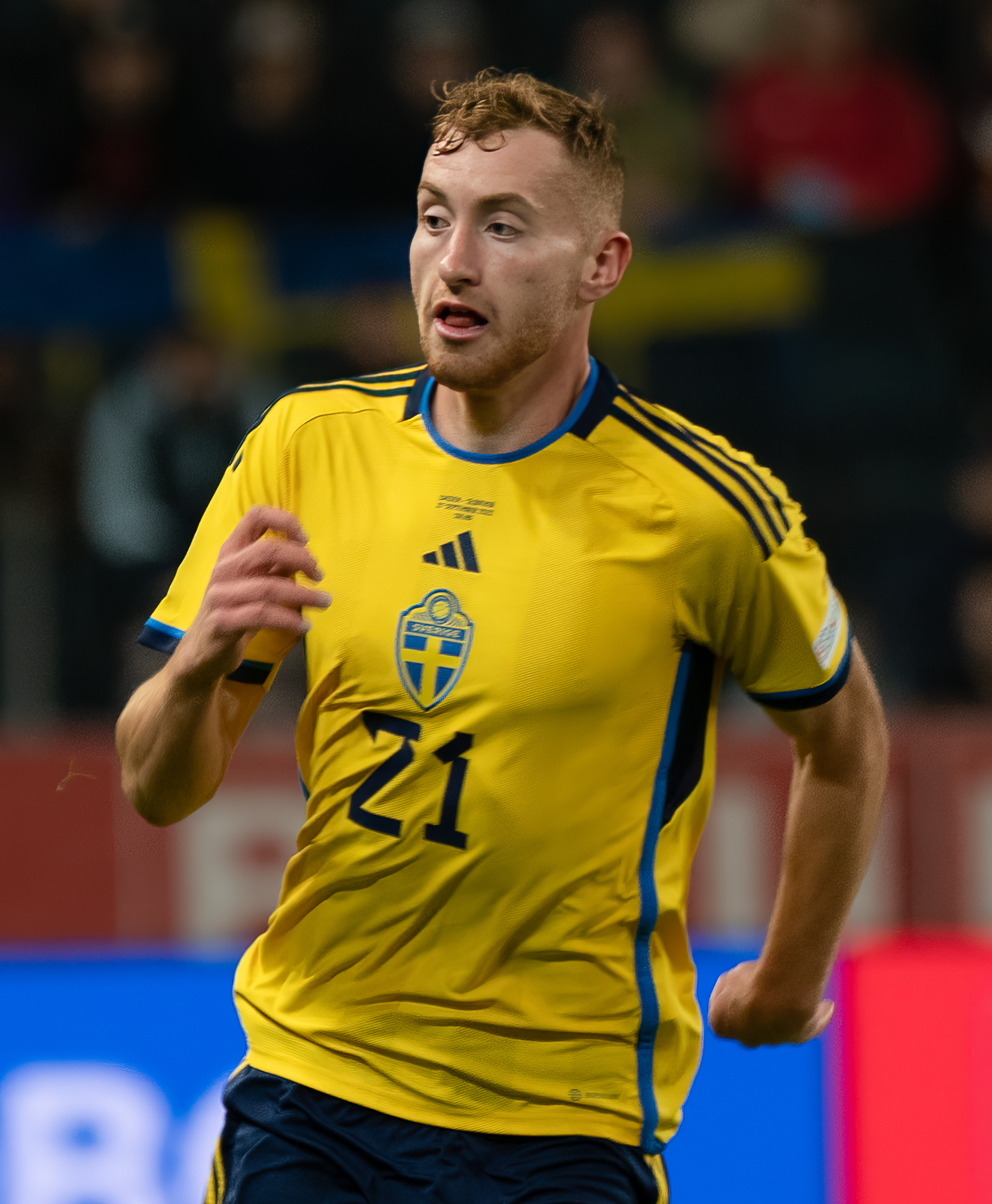
- Kulusevski playing for Sweden in 2022

Personal information
- Full name: Dejan Kulusevski
- Date of birth: 25 April 2000 (age 26)
- Place of birth: Stockholm, Sweden
- Height: 1.86 m (6 ft 1 in)
- Positions: Attacking midfielder; winger

Team information
- Current team: Tottenham Hotspur
- Number: 21

Youth career
- 2006–2016: IF Brommapojkarna
- 2016–2018: Atalanta

Senior career*
Years	Team	Apps	(Gls)
2018–2020	Atalanta	3	(0)
2019–2020	→ Parma (loan)	17	(4)
2020–2023	Juventus	55	(5)
2020	→ Parma (loan)	19	(6)
2022–2023	→ Tottenham Hotspur (loan)	48	(7)
2023–	Tottenham Hotspur	72	(15)

International career^{‡}
2015–2016	Macedonia U17	5	(6)
2015–2017	Sweden U17	19	(6)
2017–2018	Sweden U19	13	(2)
2019	Sweden U21	5	(2)
2019–	Sweden	47	(5)
- * Club domestic league appearances and goals as of 12:16, 9 November 2026 (UTC) ‡ National team caps and goals as of 23:55, 17 November 2026 (UTC)

Dejan Kulusevski (Macedonian: Дејан Кулушевски; born 25 April 2000) is a Swedish professional footballer who plays as an attacking midfielder or winger for Premier League club Tottenham Hotspur and the Sweden national team.

Coming through from the youth system, Kulusevski made his senior debut for Atalanta in 2019, before joining Parma on loan at the beginning of the 2019–20 season. He joined Juventus during the winter transfer window for €35 million, and was sent back to Parma on loan for the rest of the season. In January 2022, Kulusevski was sent on loan to Tottenham Hotspur in England. In June 2023, Tottenham signed Kulusevski permanently on a deal until 2028.

== Early and personal life ==
Kulusevski was born in Stockholm to a Swedish Macedonian father and a Macedonian mother. He represented both Sweden and Macedonia internationally at youth level, before opting to play for his birth country at senior level, making his full debut in 2019.

Kulusevski became engaged to fellow Swedish footballer Eldina Ahmić in May 2023, getting married on 15 June 2025. The couple have a daughter together named Leonie, born 25 April 2024. Beginning in the 2024–25 season, Kulusevski began using a goal celebration where he made a 'L' shape with his hand. While the gesture is commonly used to call somebody a 'Loser', Kulusevski revealed it was a tribute to his daughter, stating "That was all about Leonie, my biggest motivation".

His sister Sandra Kulusevska is engaged to Brighton and fellow Swedish footballer Yasin Ayari and have a daughter.

== Club career ==
=== Early career ===
Kulusevski was born in Stockholm and joined the youth activities of IF Brommapojkarna at the age of six.

=== Atalanta ===
He joined the Atalanta youth system on 7 July 2016 from Brommapojkarna, before making any senior appearance for the club. He made his Serie A debut on 20 January 2019, coming on as a substitute for Marten de Roon in a 5–0 away win against Frosinone. He made a total of three appearances for the club throughout the 2018–19 season, each as a substitute.

==== Loan to Parma ====
On 18 July 2019, Kulusevski signed to Serie A club Parma on loan until 30 June 2020. He scored his first Serie A goal in a 3–2 home win against Torino, on 30 September.

Following his form while on loan with Parma during the first part of the 2019–20 Serie A season, during which he scored four goals and provided seven assists in 17 league appearances, on 2 January 2020, Kulusevski joined fellow Serie A club Juventus on a four-and-a-half-year deal, for €35 million, which could possibly rise to €44 million with variables.

Kulusevski was sent back on loan to Parma for the remainder of the season. He finished the season with 10 goals and nine assists, and was awarded the Serie A Best Young Player for the season.

=== Juventus ===
Kulusevski scored on his Juventus debut on 20 September 2020 in a 3–0 league win at home against Sampdoria. On 19 May 2021, he scored the opening goal and later set-up Federico Chiesa's match-winning goal in a 2–1 victory over Atalanta in the 2021 Coppa Italia Final. In the next season, Kulusevski scored the winning goal in the Champions League match against Zenit Saint Petersburg with a header in the 86th minute on 20 October. Kulusevski's playing time was reduced under Massimiliano Allegri, making 20 appearances and scoring two goals.

=== Tottenham Hotspur ===
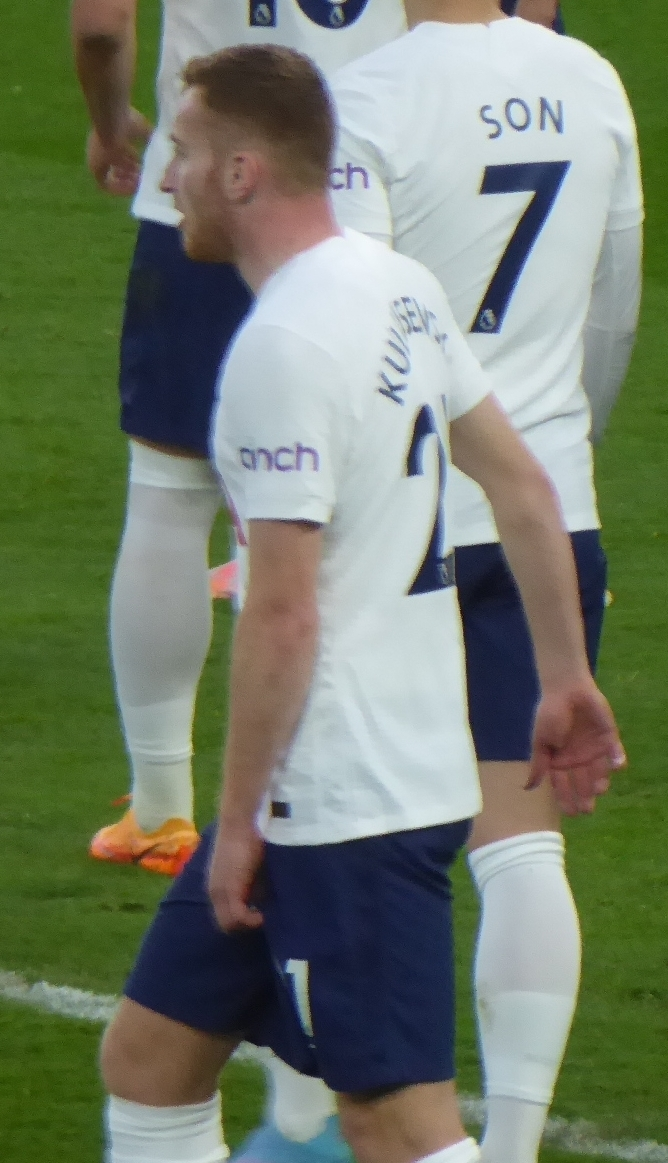
Kulusevski with Tottenham Hotspur in 2022

==== 2021-22 ====
On 31 January 2022, Kulusevski was sent on an 18-month loan to Premier League side Tottenham Hotspur; the loan deal was worth €10 million, and included an option for purchase, which would become an obligation under certain conditions for an additional fee of €35 million.

He made his first appearance for Spurs on 5 February in the FA Cup match against Brighton & Hove Albion, coming on a substitute in a 3–1 win. On 19 February, Kulusevski scored his first goal on his first start for Tottenham inside four minutes, he also assisted the 95th-minute winner for Harry Kane in a 3–2 win away against Manchester City. Only a week later, Kulusevski scored his second goal in a 4–0 win over Leeds United.

On 7 March, Kulusevski picked up 2 assists in the 5–0 win over Everton, bringing his tally to 5 goal contributions (2 goals and 3 assists) in 4 games. On 9 April, Kulusevski scored and assisted in a 4–0 away win vs Aston Villa. A month later on 1 May, Kulusevski came off the bench to provide 2 assists as Tottenham beat Leicester City 3–1. 3 weeks later on 22 May, Kulusevski scored a brace in a 5–0 win against Norwich City, as Tottenham clinched UEFA Champions League qualification on the final day.

The January additions of Dejan Kulusevski and Rodrigo Bentancur from Juventus were key factors in Tottenham's UEFA Champions League qualification. Kulusevski ended the 2021-22 Premier League season with 13 goal contributions (5 goals and 8 assists) in 14 starts.

==== 2022-23 ====
On 6 August, Kulusevski scored and setup the equaliser in a 4–1 win against Southampton in the first game of the season.

On 27 September, Kulusevski picked up a muscle injury in the UEFA Nations League as Sweden drew 1-1. This injury would keep out of the next 10 Tottenham games.

On 6 November, Kulusevski returned off the bench in the 2–1 loss against Liverpool and assisted Harry Kane inside just 2 minutes of his return. A week later, Kulusevski assisted the winner for Rodrigo Bentancur as Tottenham turned around a 3–2 deficit to win 4–3.

On 19 January, Kulusevski for the second consecutive season scored the opener at the Etihad Stadium vs Manchester City in a 4–2 defeat.

This would be his second and last goal of the season as Kulusevski struggled throughout season, "through a mixture of injuries, bad form and arguably poor management".

Kulusevski ended the 2022-23 season with 2 goals and 8 assists in 37 appearances.

On 17 June 2023, it was announced that Kulusevski had signed permanently with Tottenham Hotspur until 2028.

==== 2023-24 ====
On 26 August, Kulusevski scored the second in a 2–0 win against AFC Bournemouth. On 16 September, Kulusevski's 100th-minute winner gave Tottenham a 2–1 turnaround win over Sheffield United, sealing the latest ever winning comeback in Premier League history.

On 6 November, Kulusevski opened the scoring against rivals Chelsea where nine-men Tottenham eventually lost 4–1. A month later on 3 December, Kulusevski scored a 90th-minute equaliser in the 3–3 draw against Manchester City, taking his record to 3 consecutive seasons scoring at the Etihad Stadium, he also provided an assist for the opener. He was awarded Player of the match for his performance. 2 weeks later, Kulusevski scored and assisted as ten-men Tottenham beat Nottingham Forest 2–0, winning Player of the match again.

On 19 May 2024, Kulusevski scored a vital brace in a 3–0 win over Sheffield United on the final day, winning Player of the match and giving Tottenham a UEFA Europa League spot.

Kulusevski ended the 2023–24 season with 8 goals and 3 assists in 39 appearances for Spurs.

==== 2024-25 ====
On 18 September, Kulusevski assisted Djed Spence for the 88th-minute equaliser as Tottenham turned around a 1–0 deficit to win 2–1 against Coventry City in the EFL Cup third round.

On 29 September, Kulusevski scored the second in a 3–0 away win against Manchester United. He also created 9 chances in the match, the most of any player in the 2024-25 Premier League season. On 19 October, Kulusevski scored the equaliser against West Ham United in a 4–1 win. Later that month on 30 October, Kulusevski assisted both goals as Tottenham beat Manchester City 2–1 in the fourth round of the EFL Cup. A month later Kulusevski terrorised Manchester City again assisting in a 4–0 win at the Etihad Stadium, their biggest home defeat in over 20 years. This took him to 4 consecutive seasons with a goal contribution in the away fixture against Manchester City, and in total 3 goals and 3 assists in 4 appearances.

Kulusevski spent his first 3 1/2 seasons at Tottenham as a right winger, but during the 2024-25 campaign, Ange Postecoglou started playing Kulusevski as an attacking midfielder.

On 8 December, Kulusevski put Tottenham 2–0 up against rivals Chelsea where they eventually lost 4–3, this took him to consecutive goals in this fixture too. 4 days later, Kulusevski came off the bench to rescue a point against Rangers in a 1–1 draw in the UEFA Europa League. 3 days later, Kulusevski scored in the 5-0 demolition of Southampton. 4 days later, Kulusevski scored versus Manchester United again in a 4–3 win in the EFL Cup quarter-finals. 3 days later, Kulusevski scored in the 6–3 loss against Liverpool taking him to his fifth consecutive game with a goal.

On 12 January 2025, Kulusevski scored off the bench in extra time as Tottenham won 3–0 against Tamworth in the third round of the FA Cup. A week later, Kulusevski scored a clever lob against Everton as Tottenham were beaten 3–2.

A month later on 22 February, Kulusevski added the fourth in a 4–1 over Ipswich. Kulusevski suffered a foot injury before Tottenham's UEFA Europa League round of 16 tie against AZ Alkmaar keeping him out for 6 weeks.

Kulusevski returned as a substitute in a 4–2 defeat against Wolverhampton Wanderers on 13 April.

On 8 May, Kulusevski assisted Pedro Porro in a 2–0 win against FK Bodø/Glimt in the UEFA Europa League semifinal 2nd leg sending them to the final 5–1 on aggregate.

A week later on 15 May, the club said Kulusevski would be out for "at least a few months" after surgery for a knee injury suffered in the 2–0 defeat against Crystal Palace on 11 May.

Kulusevski ended the 2024-25 season with 10 goals and 11 assists in 50 games across all competitions.

==== 2025-26 ====
By August, it had become apparent that Kulusevski was unlikely to return until "around the turn of the year." He missed the entire 2025–26 season due to injury and was also ruled out of the 2026 World Cup.

==== 2026-27 ====
On 19 October 2026, 526 days after his injury, Kulusevski finally returned to the pitch when he came on as a late substitute for Mohammed Kudus in a 3–1 league win over Coventry City.

== International career ==
Born in Sweden to Macedonian parents from Ohrid, Kulusevski played for all Swedish youth national teams, as well as the Macedonia under-17 national team. He was called up to the Sweden national team for the first time in November 2019 for the UEFA Euro 2020 qualifying games against Romania and the Faroe Islands. For the senior national team, Kulusevski has said that his choice of allegiance was 'an easy one' since it was always his preference to represent Sweden.

Kulusevski made his senior international debut for Sweden on 18 November 2019, coming on as a substitute for Ken Sema in a 3–0 win against the Faroe Islands in the last game of the Euro 2020 qualifying stage. On 8 September 2020, he made his first start for Sweden, playing for 90 minutes before being substituted for Albin Ekdal in a 0–2 loss to Portugal in the 2020–21 UEFA Nations League. On 14 November 2020, Kulusevski scored his first international goal against Croatia in a 2–1 home win in the Nations League.

On 8 June 2021, Kulusevski tested positive for COVID-19 amid its pandemic in Sweden, and was ruled out of Sweden's opening UEFA Euro 2020 match against Spain on 14 June.

== Style of play ==
He has been deployed in several attacking roles, including attacking midfielder, box-to-box midfielder, winger on either flank, central midfielder, and also defensive positions. His primary role is as an attacking midfielder behind the striker, the mezzala role in Italian. He has also been deployed as a makeshift centre-forward. He is noted for his work rate, stamina, and ability to create scoring opportunities for teammates through assists and through balls. He has also been recognized for his technical ability, dribbling skills, and shooting ability, which contribute to both goal-scoring and chance creation.

Regarded as a promising and hard-working player in the media, his manager at Parma, Roberto D'Aversa, has compared Kulusevski to Mohamed Salah. He noted how the player "is always among the players who cover the most distance in every game", and "has the right mentality". Kulusevski himself named compatriot Zlatan Ibrahimović as an influence. Regarding his own playing style, he commented in a 2019 interview with Sportbladet: "I like to have the ball at my feet. I used to dribble a lot when I was a kid but I have got better at moving the ball more quickly. I have developed my defensive game, that was a weakness before, and that has made me a more complete player." He has also cited Belgian footballers Kevin De Bruyne and Eden Hazard as players he admires and seeks to emulate. He has also stated that Spanish striker Fernando Torres was his football idol growing up.

== Career statistics ==
=== Club ===
As of match played 7 November 2026

Appearances and goals by club, season and competition
Club	Season	League			National cup (Note: Includes Coppa Italia, FA Cup)		League cup (Note: Includes EFL Cup)		Europe		Other		Total	
Club	Season	Division	Apps	Goals	Apps	Goals	Apps	Goals	Apps	Goals	Apps	Goals	Apps	Goals
Atalanta	2018–19	Serie A	3	0	0	0	—		—		—		3	0
Parma (loan)	2019–20	Serie A	36	10	3	0	—		—		—		39	10
Juventus	2020–21	Serie A	35	4	5	3	—		6 (Note: Appearances in UEFA Champions League)	0	1 (Note: Appearance in Supercoppa Italiana)	0	47	7
Juventus	2021–22	Serie A	20	1	1	0	—		5	1	1	0	27	2
Juventus	2022–23	Serie A	0	0	0	0	—		0	0	—		0	0
Juventus	Total		55	5	6	3	—		11	1	2	0	74	9
Tottenham Hotspur (loan)	2021–22	Premier League	18	5	2	0	—		—		—		20	5
Tottenham Hotspur (loan)	2022–23	Premier League	30	2	2	0	1	0	4	0	—		37	2
Tottenham Hotspur (loan)	Total		48	7	4	0	1	0	4	0	—		57	7
Tottenham Hotspur	2023–24	Premier League	36	8	2	0	1	0	—		—		39	8
Tottenham Hotspur	2024–25	Premier League	32	7	2	1	5	1	11 (Note: Appearances in UEFA Europa League)	1	—		50	10
Tottenham Hotspur	2025–26	Premier League	0	0	0	0	0	0	0	0	0	0	0	0
Tottenham Hotspur	2026–27	Premier League	4	0	0	0	0	0	—		—		4	0
Tottenham Hotspur	Total		72	15	4	1	6	1	11	1	0	0	93	18
Career total			214	38	17	4	7	1	26	2	2	0	266	45

=== International ===
As of match played 17 November 2026

Appearances and goals by national team and year
National team	Year	Apps	Goals
Sweden	2019	1	0
Sweden	2020	7	1
Sweden	2021	12	0
Sweden	2022	7	1
Sweden	2023	8	1
Sweden	2024	10	2
Sweden	2025	0	0
Sweden	2026	2	0
Total		47	5

As of match played 17 November 2026

Scores and results list Sweden's goal tally first, score column indicates score after each Kulusevski goal.

List of international goals scored by Dejan Kulusevski
No.	Date	Venue	Opponent	Score	Result	Competition	Ref.
1	14 November 2020	Friends Arena, Solna, Sweden	Croatia	1–0	2–1	2020–21 UEFA Nations League A	
2	2 June 2022	Stožice Stadium, Ljubljana, Slovenia	Slovenia	2–0	2–0	2022–23 UEFA Nations League B	
3	9 September 2023	Lilleküla Stadium, Tallinn, Estonia	Estonia	2–0	5–0	UEFA Euro 2024 qualifying	
4	19 November 2024	Strawberry Arena, Solna, Sweden	Azerbaijan	1–0	6–0	2024–25 UEFA Nations League C	
5	19 November 2024	Strawberry Arena, Solna, Sweden	Azerbaijan	4–0	6–0	2024–25 UEFA Nations League C	

== Honours ==
Juventus

- Coppa Italia: 2020–21
- Supercoppa Italiana: 2020

Tottenham Hotspur

- UEFA Europa League: 2024–25

Individual

- Serie A Best Under-23: 2019–20
- Swedish Midfielder of the Year: 2020, 2023, 2024
- Swedish Forward of the Year: 2022
- Guldbollen: 2022, 2023
