= Macedonians in France =

Macedonians in France Македонци во Франција Macédoniens en France
Total population
- 2,300-15,000 (est)

Regions with significant populations
- Paris

Languages
- Primarily Macedonian and French

Religion
- Macedonian Orthodox

Related ethnic groups
- Macedonians

Macedonians (in French: Macédoniens) in France form a small minority mainly concentrated in the capital Paris. Most of the immigrants originated from the Skopje, Bitola, Sloeštica, Struga, Ohrid and Kicevo regions. More still emigrated to France after the breakup of Yugoslavia. The French government estimates the number of Macedonians in France to be 2,300 while Macedonian figures put the number at over 15,000 people.

The names of 33 Macedonian soldiers killed fighting for France in World War I are inscribed on a monument in the Peace Park of Colombelles, Normandy.

== Notable people ==
- Aleksandar Damčevski - footballer
- Evdokija Danajlovska - composer
- Blagoja Dimčevski - violinist from Toulouse
- Zilber Karevski - writer
- fr:Christophe Najdovski - politician
- Jordan Plevnes - Writer and Ambassador
- Stefani Sen Senar - writer from Paris
- Paskal Sotirovski (1923–2007), astrophysicist
- Hristijan Šanev - painter from Paris

== See also ==
- France–North Macedonia relations
- Macedonian diaspora
- Immigration to France
