= Macedonians in Sweden =

Macedonians in Sweden Македонци во Шведска Makedoner i Sverige
Total population
- 9,384 (2017) of which 7,731 born in Macedonia and 1,653 born in Sweden but with both parents born in Macedonia

Regions with significant populations
- Malmö, Gothenburg, Eslöv, Helsingborg, Trelleborg, Växjö

Languages
- Primarily Macedonian and Swedish

Religion
- Macedonian Orthodox

Related ethnic groups
- Macedonians, Macedonian diaspora

According to the official census of 2017, there are 9,384 ethnic Macedonians in Sweden.

== History ==
The official census of 2006, there are 3,669 ethnic Macedonians. In 2008, the Swedish immigrant center reported that there are 6,000 Macedonians in Sweden.

== Immigration ==
Macedonians began to immigrate to Sweden after World War II. Many of these were originally Slavic speakers of Greek Macedonia who were later joined by Macedonians from Yugoslavia. The Macedonian population settled heavily in the south-western region of Sweden. Many immigrants settled in towns like Stockholm, Malmö, Gothenburg, Eslöv, Helsingborg, Trelleborg, Örebro and Växjö. The Swedish government officially recognises the Macedonian minority.

== Organisations and culture ==
Macedonians in Sweden are well organised through many associations and they are recognised as a Macedonian minority through law. Throughout Sweden there are over 20 registered Macedonian associations, among the largest are:

- Makedoniska Riksförbundet i Sverige / Macedonian Union, Gothenburg
- Makedoniska kulturföreningen Goce Delcev / Kud Gotse Delchev, Gothenburg
- Kulturföreningen Makedonija / Kud Makedonija, Malmö

The Macedonian associations are partly financed by Swedish government. There are also special provisions established by the Swedish government for education in Macedonian. Each year the various organisations hold the Zimski Festival (English: Winter Festival). The Associations also organise beauty contests, poetry nights and discos. The organizations have also had involvement with Macedonians in Denmark. They also run Saturday schools and humanitarian activities. There are three women's groups in operation in Sweden;

- Goce Delčev from Gothenburg
- Kočo Racin from Borås
- Makedonija '91 from Halmstad.

== Religion ==
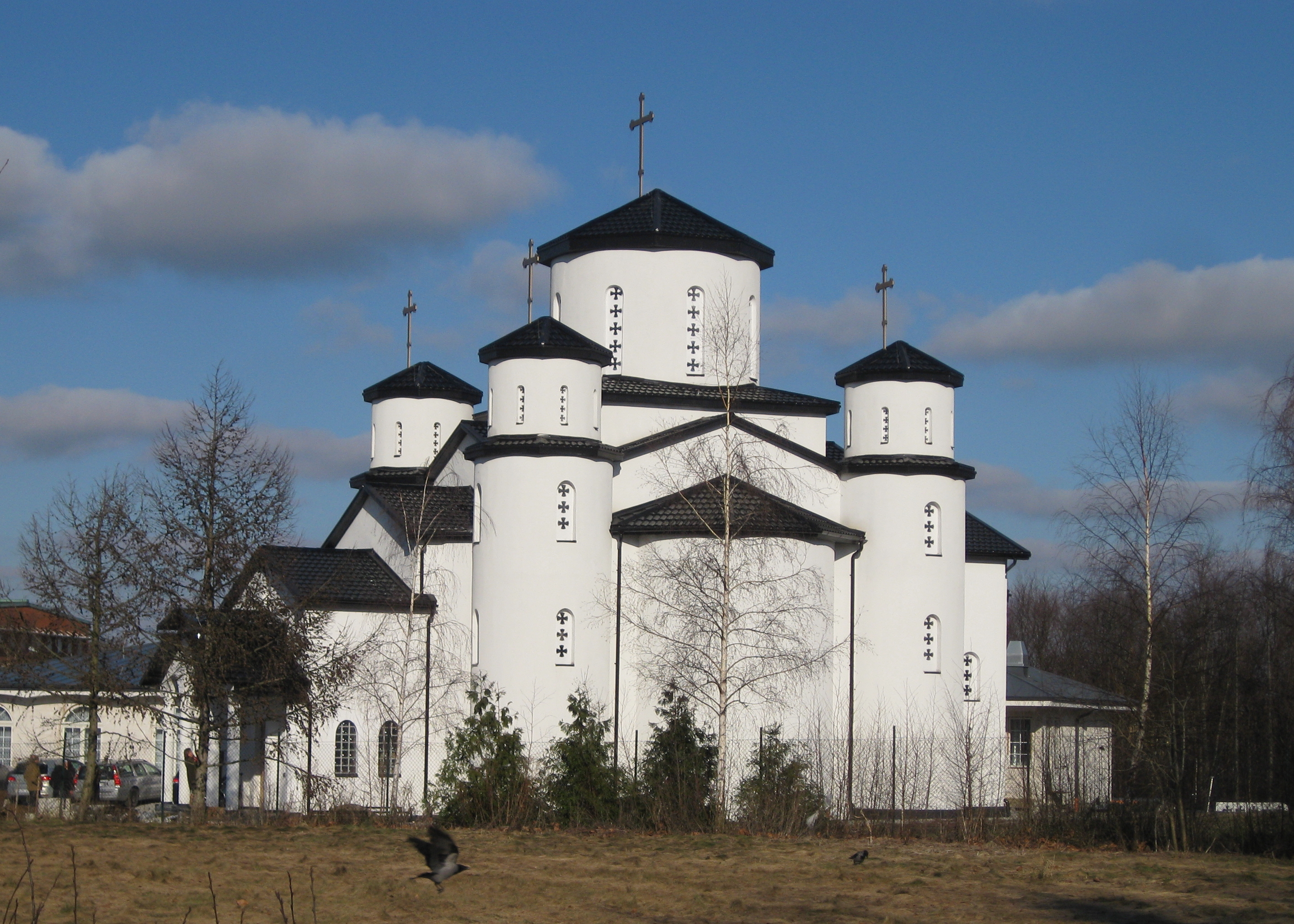
Macedonian orthodox church "St. Naum of Ohrid" in Malmö

The Macedonians in Sweden are predominantly of the Orthodox faith. On 14. January 1973 they established the first Macedonian Orthodox Church municipality (MPCO) in Europe dedicated to Naum of Ohrid. There are currently two Macedonian Orthodox Churches in Sweden, Makedoniska ortodoxa kyrkan Sveti Naum Ohridski in Malmö which have 4000 believers, and Makedoniska Ortodoxa Kyrkliga Församlingen in Gothenburg. Both of them are part of Macedonian Orthodox Church, led by the metropolitan of the European Diocese.

== Sport ==
Macedonian community have their own football club, named IF Vardar from Gothenburg, which is playing in Swedish league "Division 5A".

== Media ==
Many forms of media have been established by the Macedonians in Sweden. They have their own newspaper, called "Makedonski Vesnik" which was first published in 1978, by "Makedoniska Riksförbundet i Sverige", the Macedonian community in Sweden. The newspaper informs Macedonians in Sweden about topics related to them in Sweden and in North Macedonia. They have also founded their own radio station in Gothenburg, called Makedonski Glas radio (Swedish: Makedonisk Röst), which broadcasts in Macedonian.

== Notable people ==
- Dejan Kulusevski, footballer
- Dime Jankulovski, footballer
- Goran Slavkovski, footballer

== See also ==
- North Macedonia–Sweden relations
- Macedonian diaspora
- Immigration to Sweden
