= Greece–Poland relations =

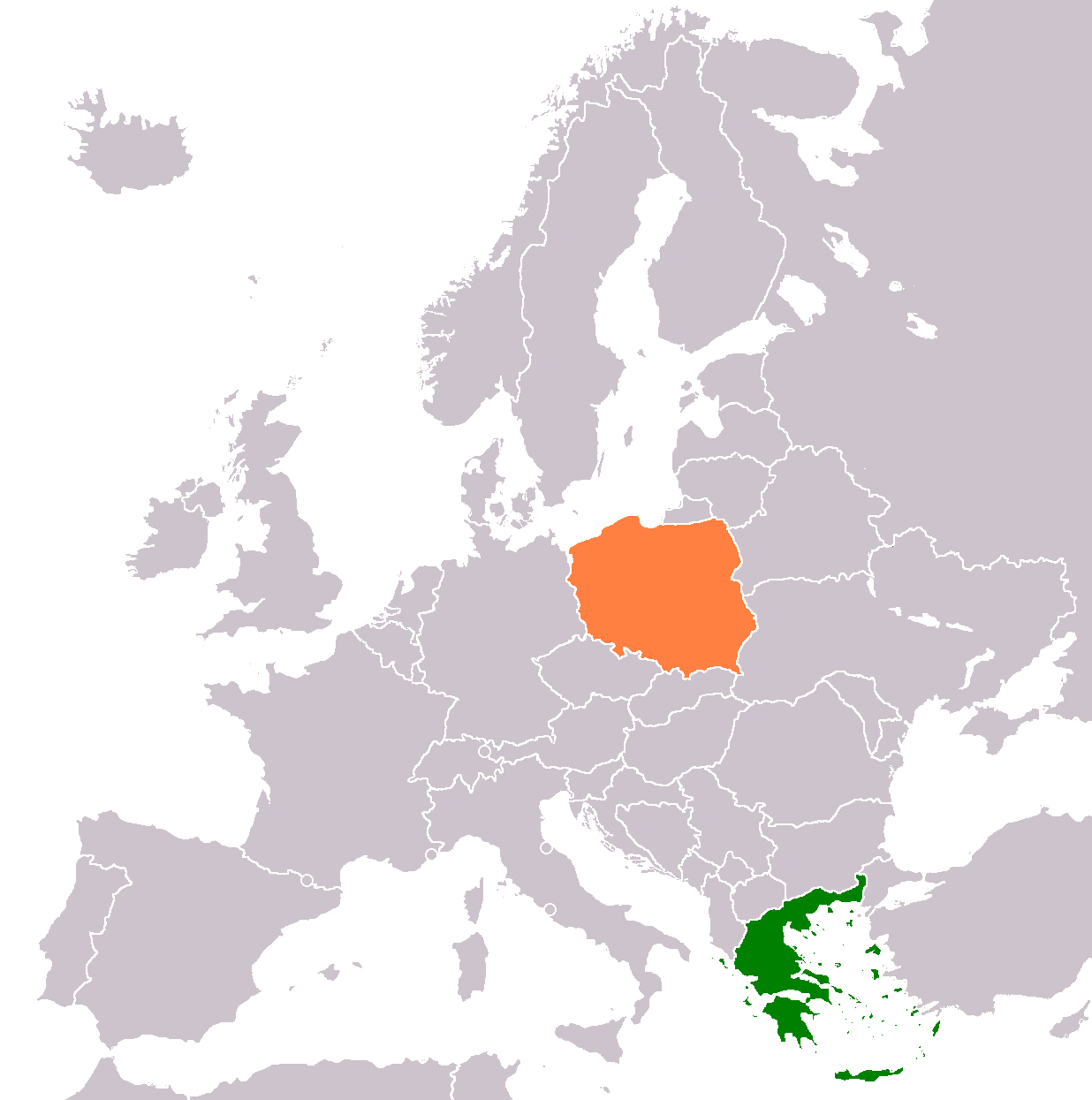
- Greece: Poland

Diplomatic mission
- Embassy of Greece, Warsaw: Embassy of Poland, Athens

Greece–Poland relations are relations between Greece and Poland. Both countries are full members of NATO, the European Union, Three Seas Initiative, OECD, OSCE, the Council of Europe and the World Trade Organization. There are circa 4,000 people of Greek descent living in Poland, and over 20,000 people of Polish descent living in Greece. Greece has given full support to Poland's membership in the European Union and NATO.

== History ==
=== Early contacts ===
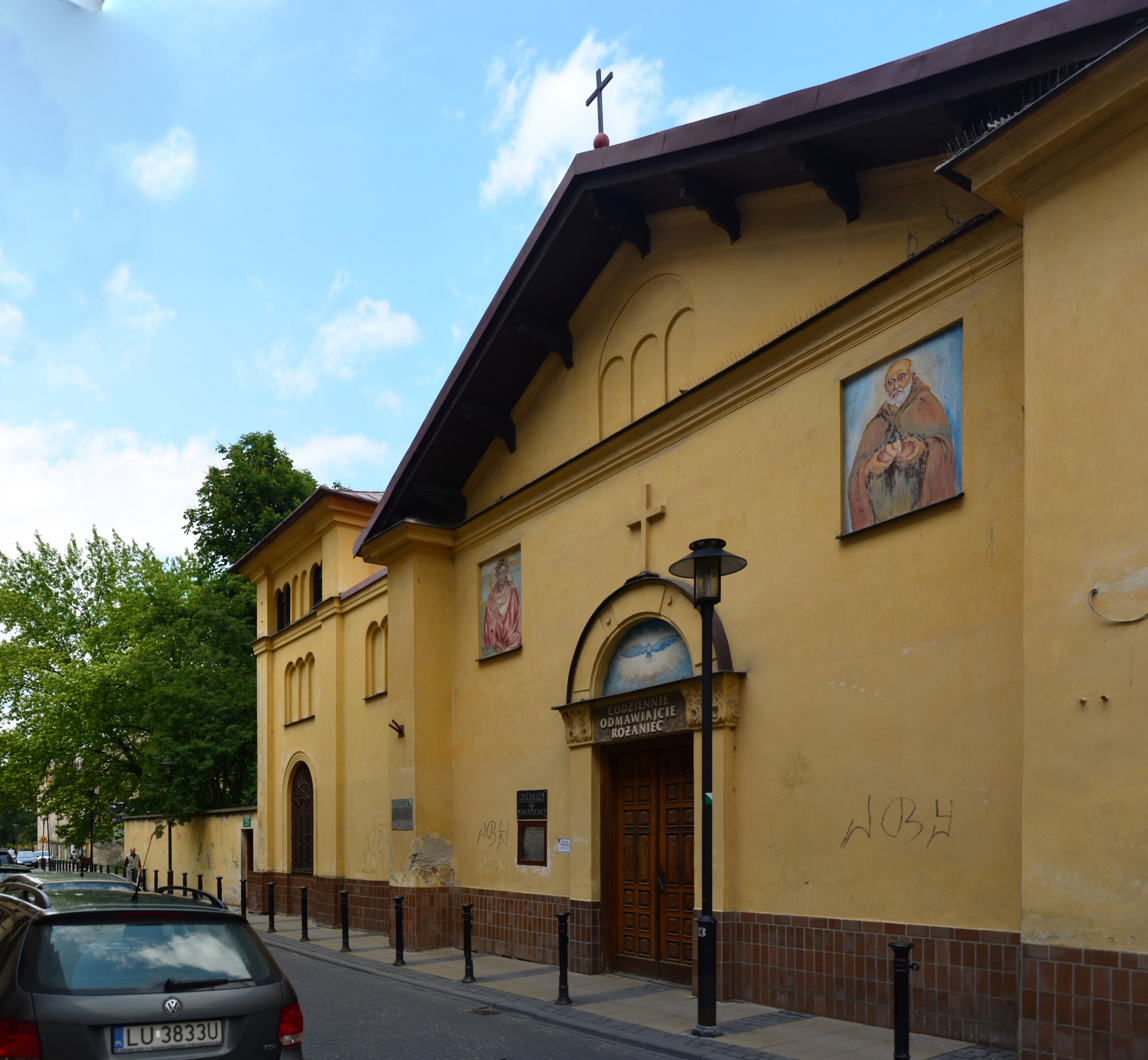
Saint Josaphat church in Lublin, founded by the Greek minority in Poland in 1768

Since antiquity there have been direct and indirect contact between Greece and Poland. Historic Greek cities in present-day Ukraine had contacts with the people of Poland. During the Middle Ages Polish authors, politicians and philosophers were influenced by Greek literature, democracy and sense of freedom. Greeks, many of whom were merchants, lived in Poland since the Late Middle Ages (see Greeks in Poland).

Since the 19th century both nations often shared a similar fate, and their history has sometimes intertwined. In the 19th century both were under the rule of foreign powers. Greece was ruled by the Ottoman Empire, and Poland was partitioned between Austria, Prussia (afterwards Germany) and Russia. Greece eventually regained independence during the Greek War of Independence in the 1820s, in which Polish volunteers also fought on the side of the Greeks, including the Battle of Peta and the defense of Missolonghi. Several Polish 19th-century uprisings remained unsuccessful, and Poland regained independence only after World War I in 1918.

=== Interbellum ===
In 1919 both countries officially established diplomatic relations. Both nations exchanged ambassadors in 1922. Several agreements were signed between Greece and Poland in the interbellum, including a trade and navigation treaty in 1930, and a friendship and conciliation treaty in 1932. In 1937–1939, both ethnic Poles and Greeks in the Soviet Union were subjected to genocidal campaigns carried out by the NKVD, known as the Polish Operation and the Greek Operation respectively.

=== World War II ===
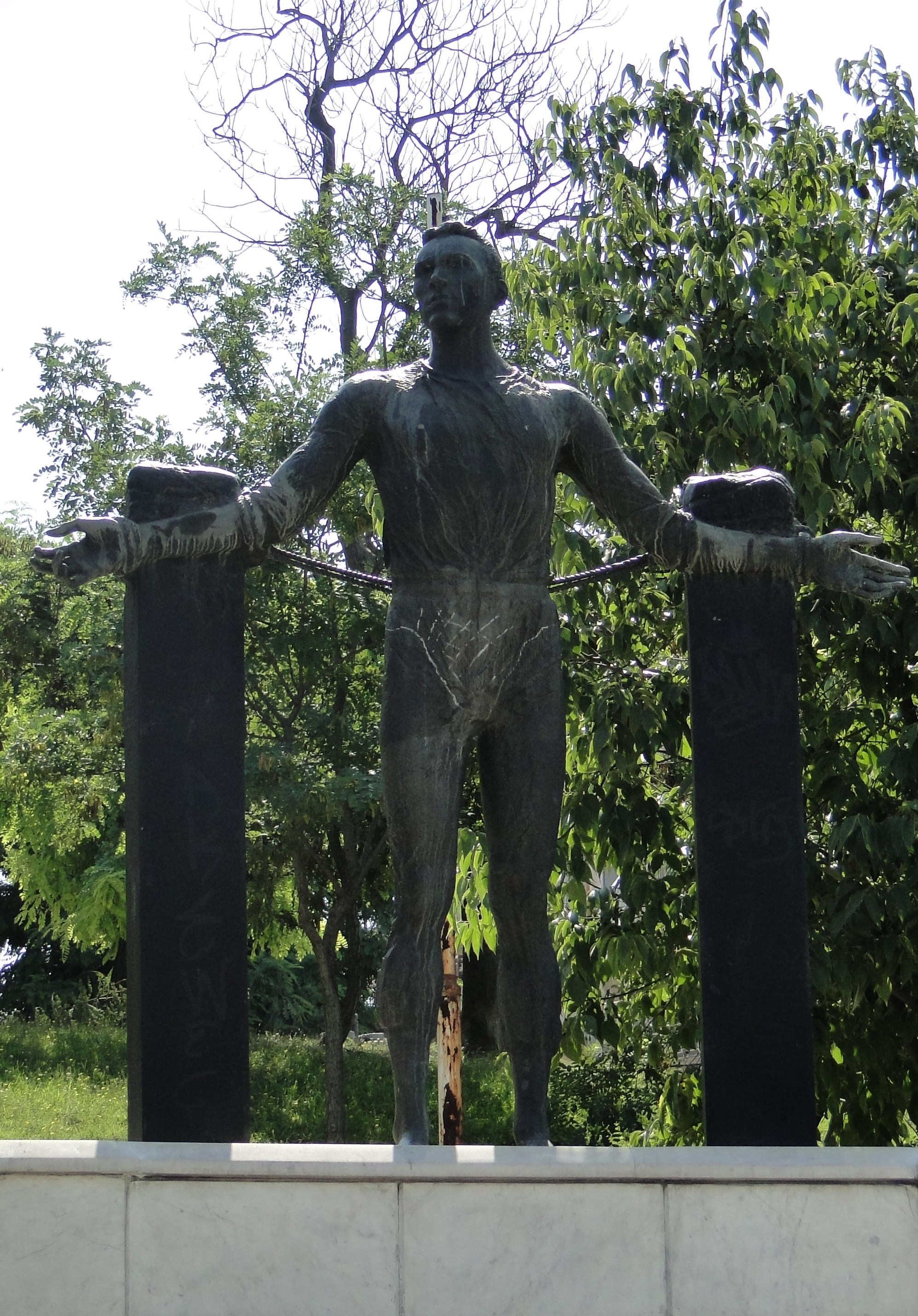
Jerzy Iwanow-Szajnowicz monument in Thessaloniki

During the German-Soviet invasion of Poland, which started World War II in 1939, Greece declared neutrality. Despite this, some of the escape routes of Poles who fled from occupied Poland to Hungary and Romania led through Greece. The Poles were then transported from Greek ports, aboard Polish, Greek and other ships, to Polish-allied France, where the Polish Army was reconstituted to continue the fight against Germany. Eventually, Greece, fearing Germany, refused to further allow Poles to evacuate aboard Greek ships, and difficulties arose, causing the escape route to be diverted to Bulgaria. By 1941 there were between 100 and 194 Polish refugees, among them Polish Jews, in Greece. In 1940–1941 the Polish Embassy in Athens and the Polish government-in-exile tried to evacuate the refugees from Greece, including Polish Jews to British Palestine, but Polish- and Greek-allied Britain did not agree.

Greece was eventually invaded as well, by Germany and Italy in 1941, and the Polish Embassy was closed. Jerzy Iwanow-Szajnowicz, a native of Poland who worked for Polish and British intelligence in occupied Greece, became a hero of the Greek resistance, commemorated with a monument in Thessaloniki. Many Greek Jews were deported by the Germans to concentration camps in occupied Poland. Greek prisoners of war were held by the Germans, alongside Polish and other Allied POWs, in the Stalag Luft III and Stalag VIII-B POW camps, and six Poles and one Greek were among the victims of the German-perpetrated Stalag Luft III murders. There is a memorial to the victims in Żagań, Poland. Greeks along with Poles were imprisoned in subcamps of the Gross-Rosen concentration camp in Iłowa and Jasień, and a subcamp of the Stutthof concentration camp in Police.

=== Post-war period ===
In 1946, Greece entered into a civil war which saw over 14,000 Greeks migrate and find refuge in Poland after the communists in Greece were defeated in 1949. The Greeks settled predominantly in the Polish cities and towns of Zgorzelec, Wrocław, Bielawa, Bielsko-Biała, Dzierżoniów, Gdynia, Jelenia Góra, Katowice, Kraków (in the Nowa Huta district), Legnica, Lubań, Niemcza, Szczecin, Świdnica, Wałbrzych and Warsaw.

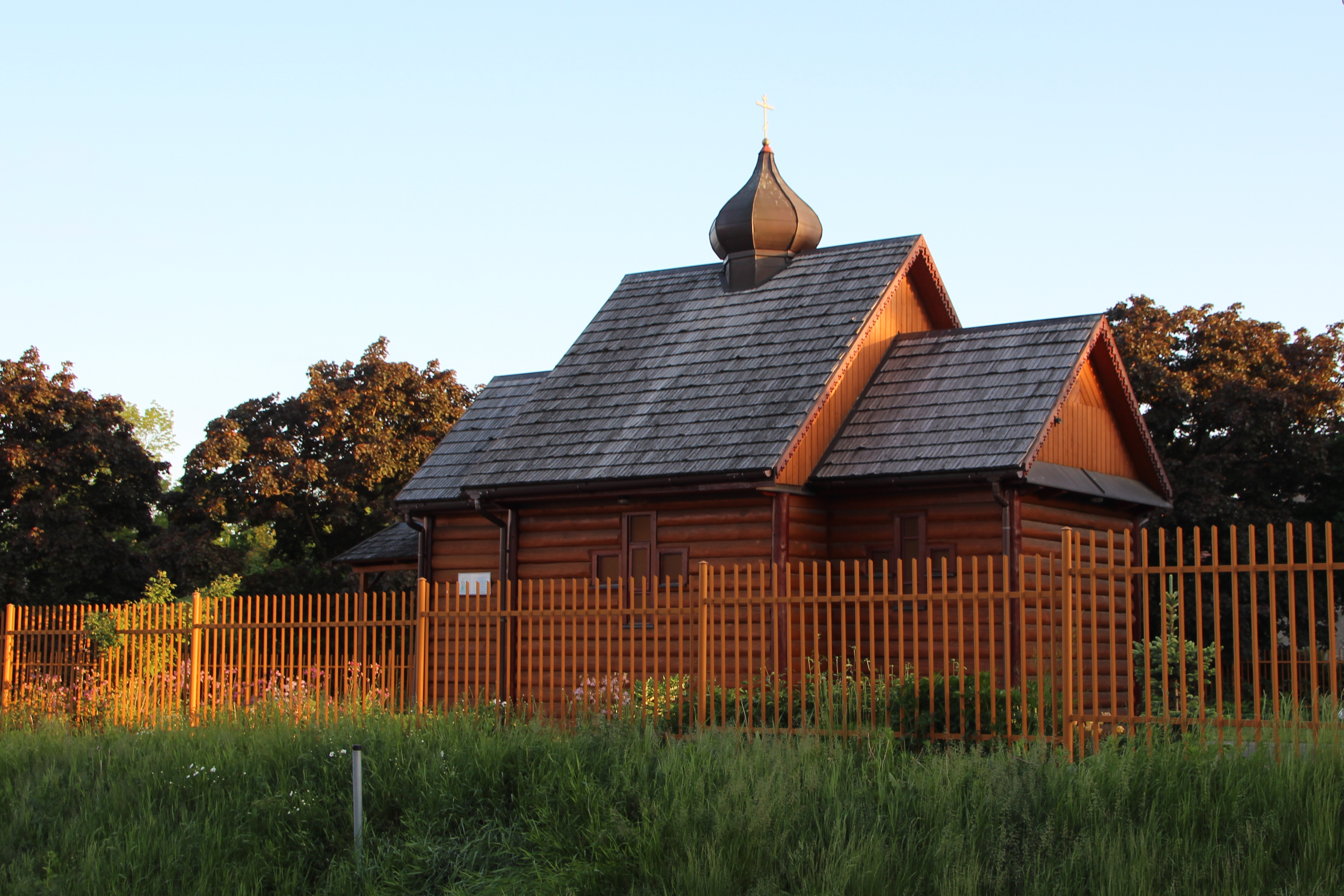
Saints Constantin and Helene church in Zgorzelec, co-funded by the Polish Greek minority

A cultural and scientific cooperation treaty was signed between Greece and Poland in Athens in 1976, and a double tax avoidance agreement was signed in Athens in 1987.

A new friendship and cooperation treaty was signed in 1998.

In 1981, Greece joined the European Union. Poland joined the union in 2004. Since Polish ascension into the union, over 20,000 Poles have migrated to Greece for employment, however, since the Greek government-debt crisis beginning in 2009, many Poles have returned and many Greeks have migrated to Poland in search of employment.

A Polish military contingent participated in a NATO mission to assist Greece in ensuring security during the 2004 Summer Olympics.

In May 2019, the Greek Ministry of Culture and Sports approved the establishment of the Polish Archaeological Institute in Athens.

In February 2021, the Sejm (Polish parliament) adopted by acclamation a resolution commemorating the 200th anniversary of the Greek War of Independence, after which Greece regained its sovereignty.

In August 2021, Poland sent a group of 143 firefighters and 46 vehicles to Greece to help extinguish the 2021 Greece wildfires. During the operation, Polish firefighters saved the town of Vilia from the fire.

In July 2023, Poland sent 149 firefighters and 49 vehicles to help extinguish the 2023 Greece wildfires, and even have secured Athens from any wildfire that might reach it.

== High-level visits ==
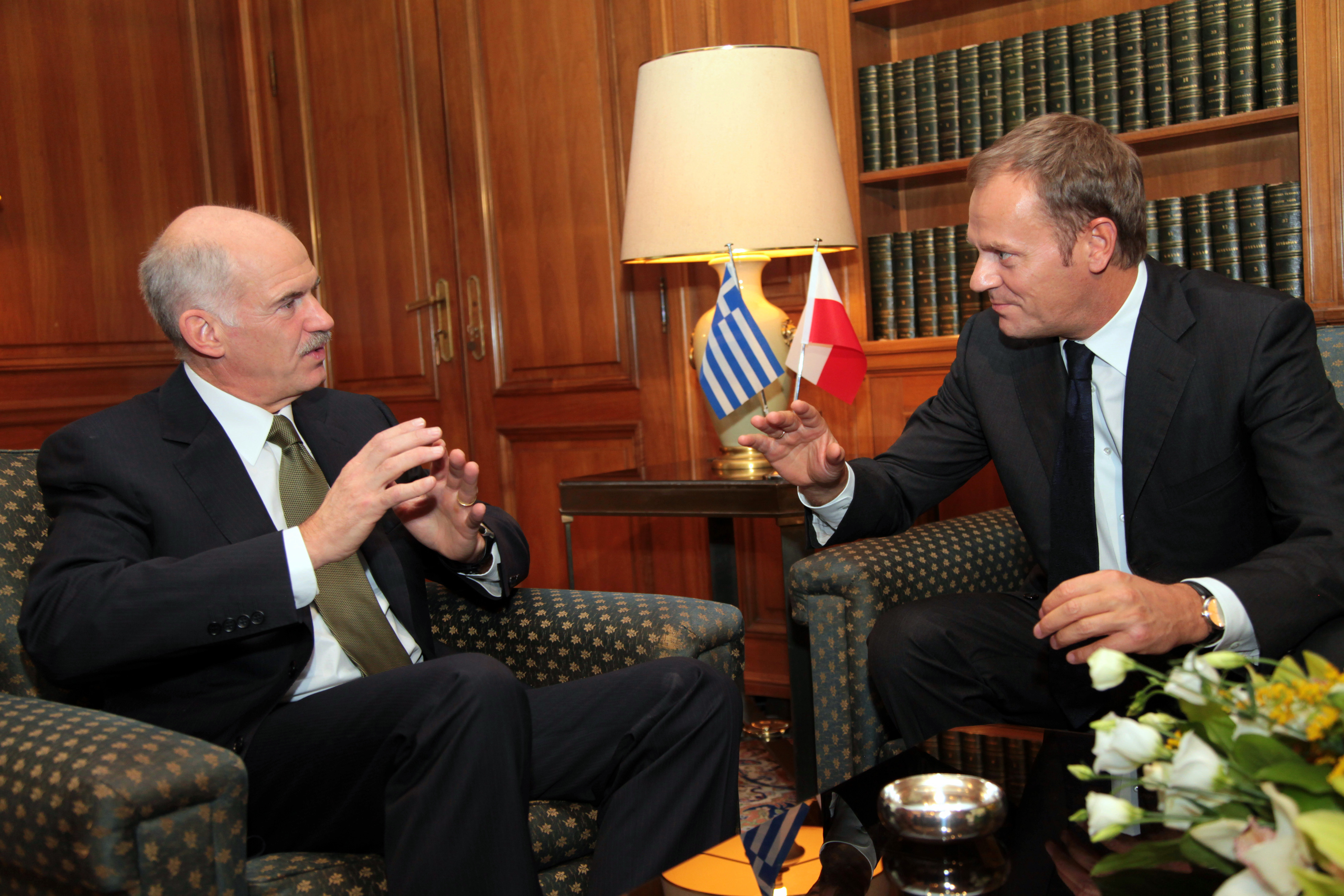
Prime Minister of Greece George Papandreou and Prime Minister of Poland Donald Tusk in Greece in 2009

High-level visits from Greece to Poland

- Prime Minister Kostas Simitis (2003)
- President Karolos Papoulias (2013)

High-level visits from Poland to Greece

- President Aleksander Kwaśniewski (2003)
- Prime Minister Leszek Miller (2003)
- Prime Minister Donald Tusk (2009)
- President Andrzej Duda (2017)

== Agreements ==
- Memorandum of Mutual Understanding on Cooperation in the Defence Industry (Warsaw, 29 June 2004);
- Agreement on economic, scientific, and technical cooperation in Agriculture and Food Economics (Athens, 7 September 1995);
- Agreement on Cooperation in Science and Technology (Warsaw, 9 November 1998);
- Agreement on the avoidance of double taxation (28 May 1987).

== Trade ==
From 2010 to 2024, there was an increase in the value of trade of goods between Greece and Poland, and the value of Polish exports of goods to Greece significantly exceeded the value of Greek exports of goods to Poland. In 2024, Greek exports of goods to Poland reached a value of approximately €1.122 billion, while Polish exports of goods to Greece reached a value of approximately €1.823 billion.

Since 2014, Greek exports of services to Poland have significantly exceeded Polish exports of services to Greece. In 2023, the value of Polish exports of services to Greece amounted to approximately €108.7 million, while the value of Greek exports of services to Poland amounted to approximately €738.8 million.

== Transportation ==
There are direct flights between Greece and Poland with the following airlines: Aegean Airlines, Ryanair, LOT Polish Airlines, Small Planet Airlines, SmartWings and Wizz Air.

== European Union and NATO ==
Greece joined the EU in 1981. Poland joined the EU in 2004. Greece joined NATO in 1952. Poland joined NATO in 1999. Greece fully supported Poland's applications to join the European Union and NATO.

== Resident diplomatic missions ==
- Greece has an embassy in Warsaw.
- Poland has an embassy in Athens.
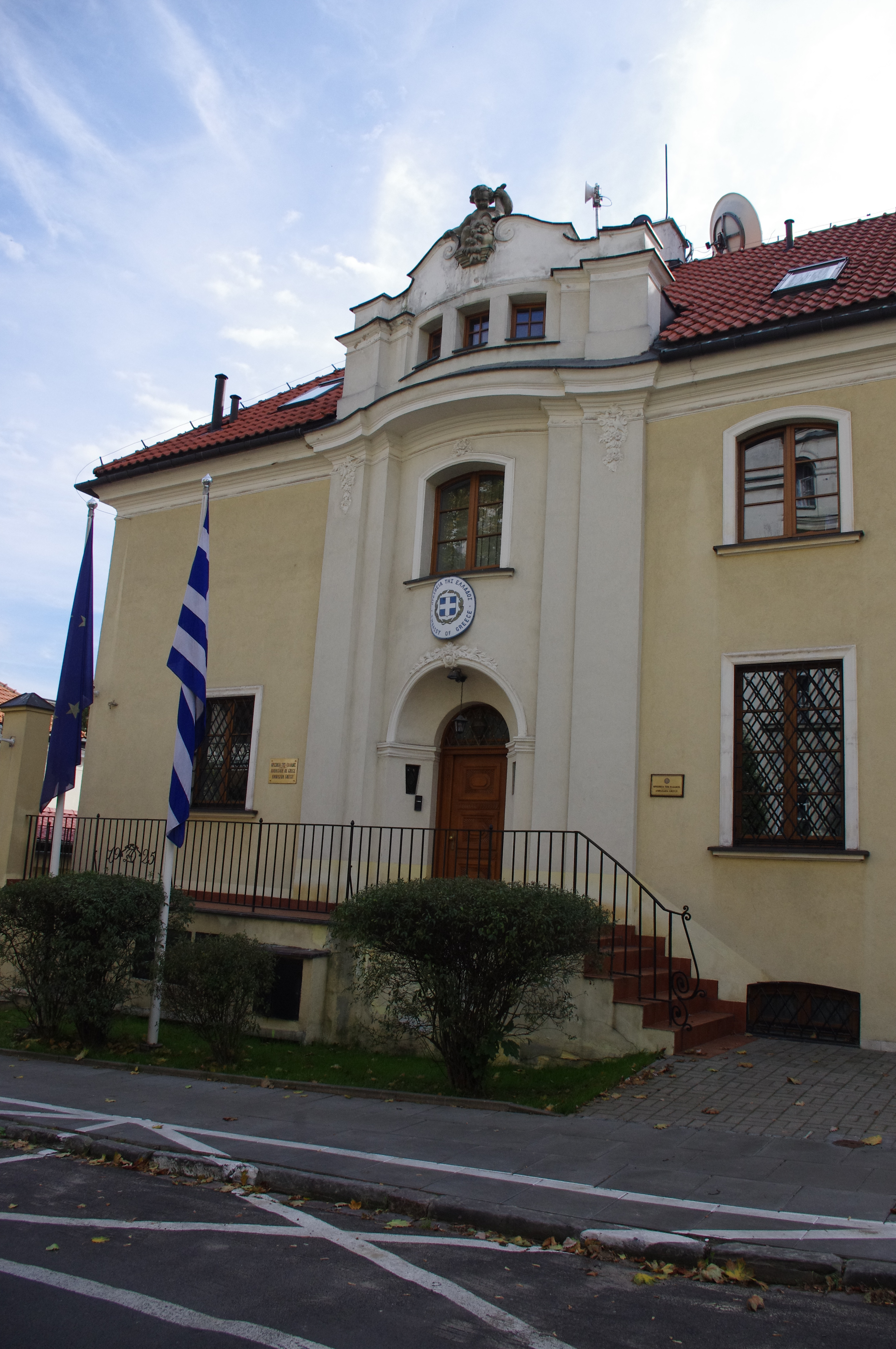
Embassy of Greece in Warsaw

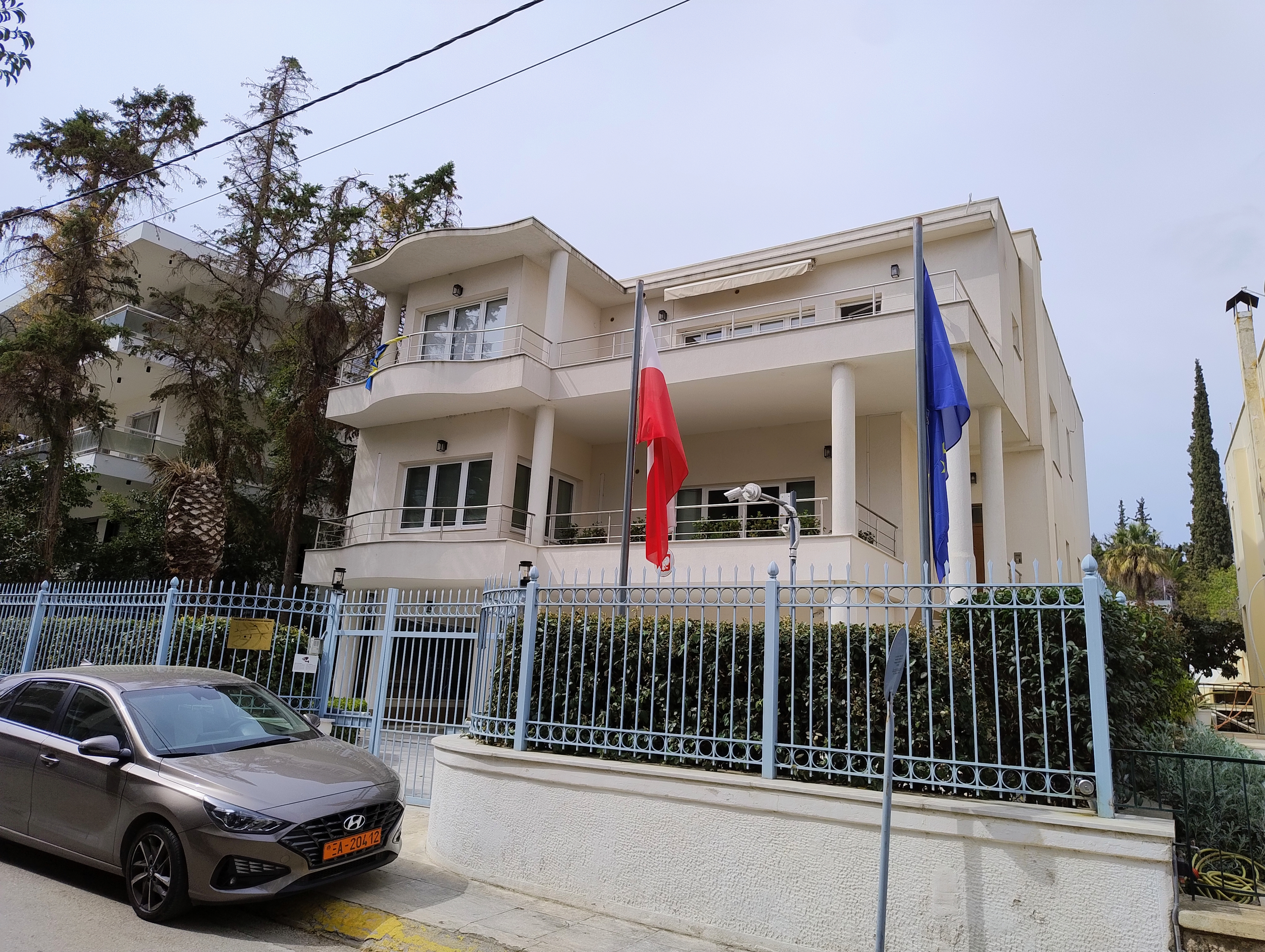
Embassy of Poland in Athens

== See also ==
- Foreign relations of Greece
- Foreign relations of Poland
- Poles in Greece
- Greeks in Poland
