= Germany–North Macedonia relations =

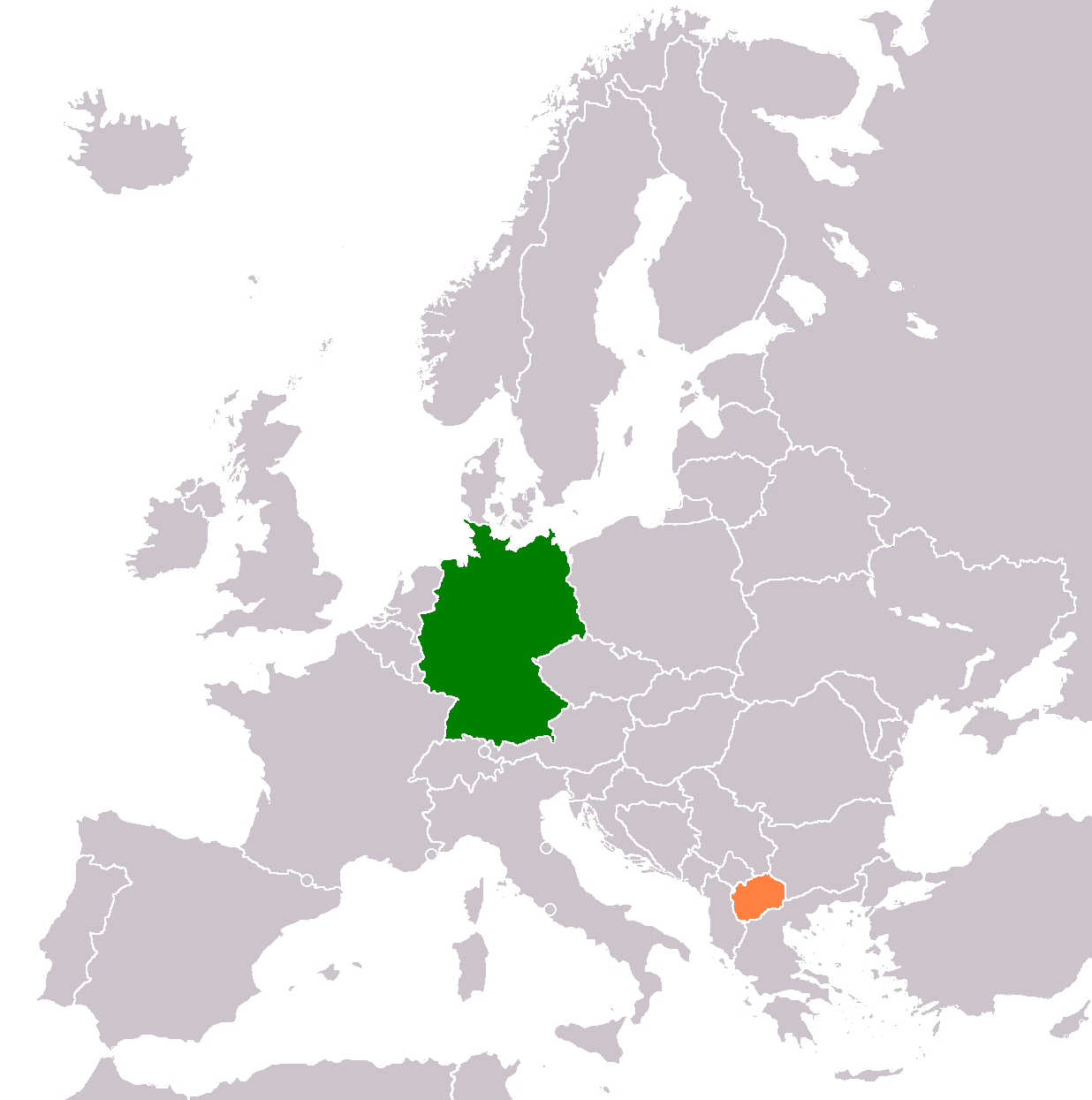

- Germany: North Macedonia

Germany–North Macedonia relations are the diplomatic relations between Germany and North Macedonia. The Foreign Office of Germany describes the relationship between Germany and North Macedonia as good. Both states are members of the COE, NATO and OSCE. Germany is EU member, North Macedonia is an EU candidate.

== History ==
From the end of the 14th century, the territory of present-day North Macedonia belonged to the Ottoman Empire. During the Great Turkish War (1683–1699), imperial troops were able to briefly capture Skopje, but were unable to hold on permanently. With the Decline of the Ottoman Empire in the 19th century, the great European powers and the Balkan peoples striving for independence under Turkish rule began to concern themselves with the territorial reorganization of southeastern Europe. The "Macedonian question" played an important role in this process. The problem became virulent with the Russian victory in the Russo-Ottoman War (1877–1878), which brought Russian troops within 60 kilometers of Istanbul. Since the major European powers were unwilling to accept Russia's major gain in influence, as recorded between the warring parties in the Peace of San Stefano, a European war was imminent. The German Chancellor Otto von Bismarck invited to the Congress of Berlin to settle the conflict peacefully. One result of this congress was that Macedonia remained part of the Ottoman Empire for the time being. This changed with the Balkan Wars of 1912 and 1913, in which the Balkan states almost completely divided the European part of the Ottoman Empire among themselves. The First Balkan War ended with the Treaty of London (1913), which divided Macedonia between Serbia, Greece and Bulgaria. In addition to the other major European powers, the German Empire also acted as a mediator in the treaty negotiations. Shortly after the conclusion of the treaty, the Second Balkan War broke out, as Bulgaria was not satisfied with what had been achieved (especially with regard to the division of Macedonia). It was defeated by its neighbors, with the result that Serbia and Greece were able to annex large parts of Macedonia.

Due to this defeat, Bulgaria turned to the Central Powers around Germany and fought alongside them in the First World War. Bulgaria's war aims were set out in the Treaty of Alliance between the German Empire and Bulgaria of September 6, 1915. A secret agreement, concluded in addition to the alliance treaty, contained territorial provisions for the enlargement of Bulgaria. In this treaty, the German Empire guaranteed Bulgaria, among other things, the acquisition and annexation of "Serbian Macedonia," which Bulgaria occupied between 1915 and 1918 and which subsequently reverted to Serbia and the newly formed Yugoslavia. With the defeat of the Central Powers, Bulgaria's hopes for territorial gains were dashed. On the contrary, the state had to cede further territories in the Treaty of Neuilly-sur-Seine. During the interwar period, the Internal Macedonian Revolutionary Organization (IMRO), which had its base of operations in Bulgaria, fought massively against the inclusion of Vardar Macedonia in Yugoslavia. The Weimar Republic, as the main revisionist power against the results of the war, appeared to it as a "natural ally" in this. Consequently, there were repeated contacts between the IMRO and German state agencies. However, the German side reacted reservedly to offers of cooperation, since although in principle the usefulness of a Macedonian Irredenta for German revisionist interests was seen, in the concrete situation German foreign policy did not want to stir up tensions in the Balkans and leave conflict management there to the victorious powers of World War I. In the political journalism and the interested German public of those years, the "Macedonian question" certainly played a role. The Macedonians' "struggle for freedom" was often romanticized and glorified. This solidarization was also related to the fact that one saw parallels to one's own fate, since many Germans, like the Macedonians, had to live under foreign rule as a consequence of the war.

In the Second World War, a similar constellation as in the First appeared: Bulgaria joined the three-power pact led by Nazi Germany in 1941 and was allowed to occupy the east and the center of Serbian Macedonia after the breakup of Yugoslavia in the course of the Balkan campaign in the same year. Unlike the Bulgarian motherland, the Jews in the occupied territories were not saved from the Holocaust. From occupied Macedonia 7100 Jews, including 2000 children, were deported to the Treblinka extermination camp. Only 196 of them survived. From the end of August 1944 Bulgaria withdrew from the occupied territories of Yugoslavia. After the conquest of Yugoslavia in 1941, western formerly Serbian Macedonia was annexed to the Italian, and since 1943 German, protectorate of Greater Albania. In the summer of 1944, the German Reich responded to the massive deterioration of its position in the Balkans by considering the creation of a formally independent Macedonian state. However, this Führer order was not carried out in the face of the advancing Red Army. In October 1944, German troops killed 80 unarmed inhabitants of the village of Radolišta (Ladorishti) in the Ladorisht massacre in "retaliation" for previous partisan attacks. The withdrawal of German troops from Greece took place through Skopje (November 1944) and brought some destruction to the city.

After the Germans left, the area became part of Yugoslavia again as the Socialist Republic of Macedonia. This Socialist Federal Republic of Yugoslavia fell into a deadly crisis with the fall of communism in the late 1980s. While Slovenia and Croatia had already declared their independence in June 1991 and were recognized by Germany on their own in the same year, developments in Macedonia were slower. The independence referendum (with a positive outcome) took place in September 1991, but recognition by the states of the European Community proved difficult because of major disputes between the newly formed country and EC member Greece (see Macedonia naming dispute). This also put a strain on German-Greek relations, as Germany argued for recognition of the Republic of Macedonia to stabilize the crisis region and provide the model for a peaceful exit from the disintegrating Yugoslavia. Despite massive Greek opposition, the German government recognized the country's independence in late 1993 and subsequently proved to be the most active supporter of the young state (for example, Germany provided the most development aid of any country and massively promoted trade and cultural relations). More recently, Germany assisted the Republic of Macedonia in dealing with refugee movements from Kosovo as a result of the Kosovo War (1999), as well as in containing the Albanian uprising in Macedonia in 2001 or its sustainable resolution by constitutional and democratic means (Ohrid Agreement).

== Migration ==
Around 100,000 Macedonians live in Germany.

== Economic relations ==
Germany is the most important trading partner for North Macedonia. Around 200 German companies are active in North Macedonia and are employing around 20,000 people in North Macedonia.

== Diplomatic missions ==
- Germany has an embassy in Skopje.
- North Macedonia has an embassy in Berlin.

== See also ==
- Foreign relations of Germany
- Foreign relations of North Macedonia
- Accession of North Macedonia to the EU
- NATO-EU relations
- Germany–Yugoslavia relations
- Macedonians in Germany
