= Macedonians in Germany =

Macedonians of Germany Македонци во Германија Mazedonier in Deutschland
- (Germany) (North Macedonia)
- Distribution of Macedonian citizens in Germany (2021)

Total population
- 117,969; 40,000+ (Bulgarian passports) TOTAL >130,000 etc.

Regions with significant populations
- Berlin, Nürnberg, Ingolstadt, Aalen, Hannover, Stuttgart, Mainz

Languages
- Primarily Macedonian and German

Religion
- predominantly Macedonian Orthodox; all other religions present in Macedonia

Related ethnic groups
- Macedonians

According to data from the Federal Statistical Office, 117,969 ethnic Macedonians were living in Germany at the end of 2020.

== History ==
According to the 2006 census, 62,295 citizens of North Macedonia reside in Germany, irrespective of ethnicity. According to the 2016 census, 95,976 ethnic Macedonians. They are concentrated mainly in Bavaria, Berlin, Hannover and Stuttgart.

== Organisation and religion ==
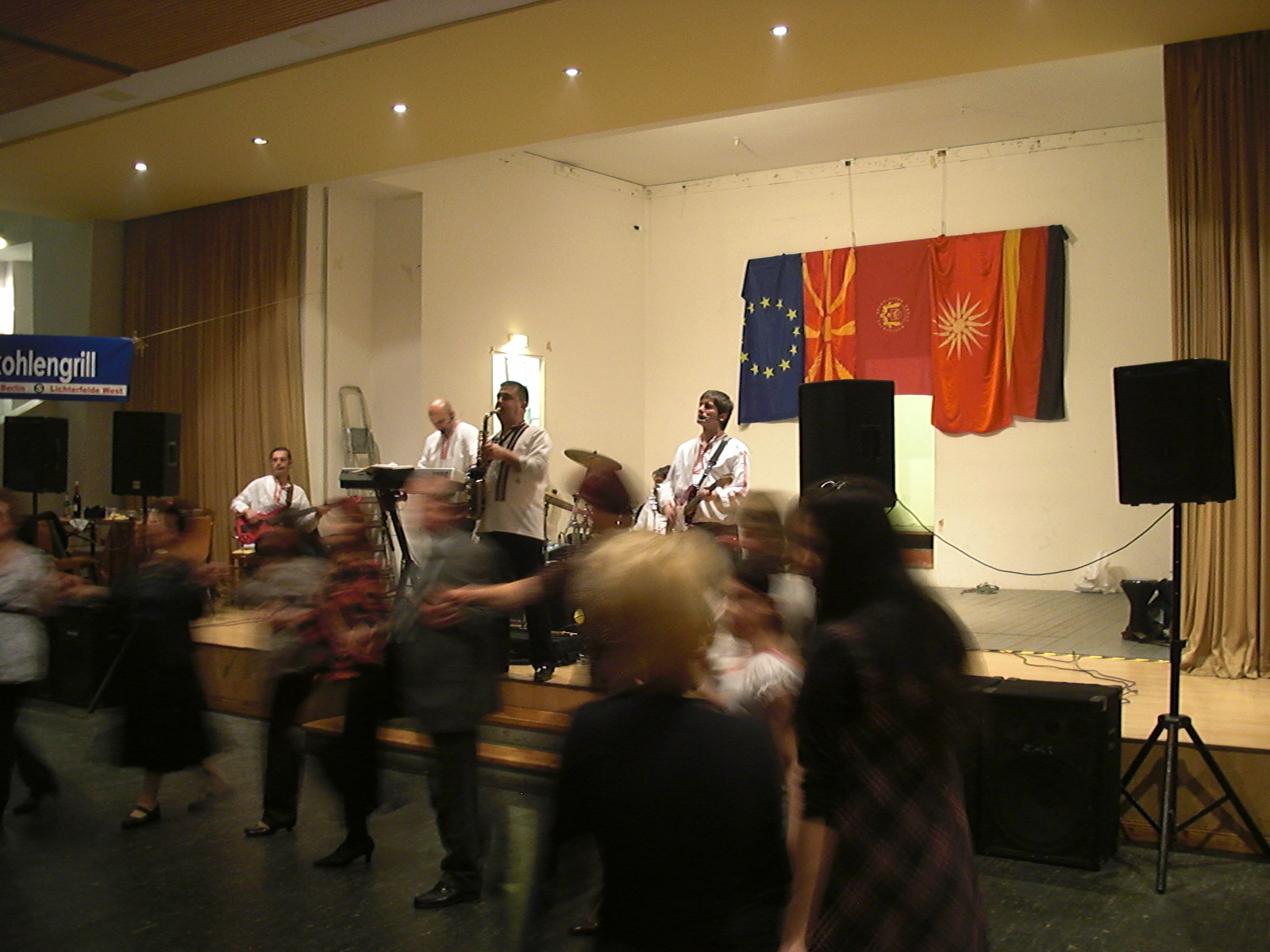
Macedonian cultural event in Berlin

Macedonians in Germany are predominantly Eastern Orthodox Christians, and are mostly organised within the framework of the Macedonian Orthodox Church or the MPCO. Most of these organizations were formed in the early 1990s. The original church community was formed in Hamburg around 1980, and soon after six other MPCO's were established in Germany. The MPCOs have their own churches where many Macedonians gather for Ilinden, Easter and Christmas. The biggest are:

- MPCO-"Sv.Kliment Ohridski" from Berlin
- MPCO-"Sveti Spas" from Laatzen / Hannover
- MPCO-"Sv. Atanasie" from Nürnberg
- MPCO-"Sv.Nikola" from Ingolstadt
- MPCO-"Sv.Kiril i Metodij" from Stuttgart
- MPCO-"Sv.Troica" from München
- MPCO-"Sv.Dimitrija" from Aalen
- MPCO-"Sveti Kiril i Metodij" from Dortmund

The MPCO's encourage the Macedonian Orthodox Church, traditional Macedonian folklore and customs from the motherland. They also encourage the upkeep of Macedonian heritage, language and traditions in Germany.

Other Christian minority groups in the Macedonian German community include Greek Catholics, Eastern Catholics, a few Uniates and some Protestants. Smaller numbers of Macedonians are Muslims who may or may not adhere to every aspect of Islam, and many more could be nonreligious/irreligious and agnostic/secularist.

== Sport ==
There are several Macedonian sports clubs in Germany. The best known is probably FK Makedonija 1970 from Berlin.

== Notable Macedonians from Germany ==
- Igor Kirov - Dancer and choreographer from Frankfurt am Main
- Oka Nikolov - Soccer player
- Alexander Veljanov - Singer, songwriter

== See also ==
- Germany–North Macedonia relations
- Macedonian diaspora
- Immigration to Germany
