= Democratic Party of the Macedonians (Kosovo) =

Political party in Kosovo

The Democratic Party of the Macedonians in Kosovo (Macedonian: Демократска партија на Македонците во Косово Albanian: Partia Demokratike e maqedonasve të Kosovës Serbian: Демократска странка Македонаца у Косову) - also known as DPM - is a Macedonian Gorani political party in the disputed territory of Kosovo that represents the Muslim Macedonian-speakers of the Gora region. The president of the party is Ismail Boyda who is also the president of the Macedonian Muslim Society. The goal of the party is more rights for the Macedonians in Gora where, according to the claims of the Association of Macedonians in Gora, Macedonians constitute 82%, and rights for Macedonians in the entire region of Kosovo.
