= Peter Arkoudios =

17th century Greek scholar and Catholic priest

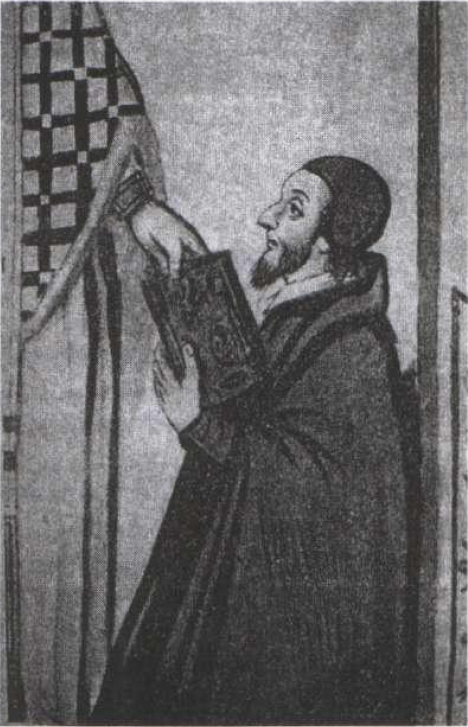

Peter Arkoudios (1562/63–1633) was a Greek scholar of the 17th century and a Roman Catholic priest.

== Biography ==
Born in Corfu in 1562/1563, Arkoudios studied at the Greek Pontifical College of Saint Athanasius in Rome and graduated with a doctorate of philosophy and theology in January 1591. He converted to Roman Catholicism from Greek Orthodoxy and was ordained a priest, showing great dedication to his new religion. Because of his knowledge and zeal he became loyal and very capable diplomat in many fine religious missions. Pope Gregory XIV and Pope Clement VII commissioned him to regulate the interests of the Catholic Church in Kingdom of Poland and the Grand Duchy of Lithuania to repel the rising of Protestant Reformation. Arkoudios showed great ability in service for twenty years and returned to Rome with great prices. His most important mission was the conversion of the Ipatii Potii, who was bishop of Vladimir and became one of the pillars of the Union of Brest. Arkoudios served Cardinal Vorgezi, nephew of Pope Paul V to achieve other promotions. He also served as a reviewer of books and after 1622 he participated as a theologian in the meetings of the Congregatio de propaganda fide. Retired in Greek High School, Arkoudios suffered an accident (1627), which caused complete paralysis, and worked on his books until his death. He died there in 1633. He was buried in the Church of St. Athanasius of Rome. After Arkoudios' death his library and manuscripts were bequeathed to the Greek Pontifical College of Saint Athanasius.

== Sources ==
- Constantine Sathas (1868). Modern Greek Literature: Biography of De Grammasi Dialampsanton Greeks, by the catalysis of the Byzantine Empire until the Greek national revolution (1453-1821). Athens: Printing children Andreou Koromila. Retrieved on October 15, 2009. https://archive.org/details/neoellnikphilol01sathgoog
- Gerhard Podskalsky, The Greek theology under Turkish rule: 1453-1821, trans. Ref. George Metallinos, ed. MIET, Athens, 2005 sel.212-217
