= Macedonians in Poland =

Macedonians in Poland Македонци во Полска
- (North Macedonia) (Poland)

Total population
- 2,000-11,458 est.

Regions with significant populations
- Warsaw, Kraków

Languages
- Primarily Macedonian and Polish

Religion
- Macedonian Orthodox

Related ethnic groups
- Macedonians

Macedonians (in Polish: Macedończycy) of Poland form a small minority of the country primarily concentrated in Southern and Central Poland. Most of the Macedonians of Poland originate from the child refugees of the Greek Civil War. Estimates put the number of Macedonian refugees settled in Poland at 11,458. Many Macedonians immigrated to Poland after the Breakup of Yugoslavia.

== History ==
A large group of refugees of around 10,000 found their way to the Lower Silesia area in Poland after the Greek Civil War. This group included both Greeks and Macedonians. In 1970, there were an estimated 5,000 Macedonian speakers in Poland.

The refugees from Greece after the Greek Civil War belonged to different ethnicities, including half reportedly of Macedonian ethnicity and speaking the Macedonian language. According to Alfred F. Majewicz and Tomasz Wicherkiewicz:

Polish administration supported the Greek refugees in Poland in forcible Hellenization of personal names of Aegean Macedonians, representatives of whom came to Poland together with the Greeks. (...) Polish authorities in close cooperation with the Organization of Political Refugees from Greece imposed limitations upon the schooling for Macedonians and successfully prevented them from creating their own organization which could be finally founded and officially recognized as late as 1989. There were also obstacles in access to literature in Macedonian and the Macedonian version of the Greek-language paper Dimokratis ceased to appear in the 1960s.

According to a 1961–62 estimate, there were roughly 5,000 Macedonians in Poland, mostly concentrated in the Oder-Neisse lands.

Many Greeks decided to return to Greece after the 1982 Amnesty Law allowed their return, whereas a large proportion of Macedonians ended up leaving Poland, for the Socialist Republic of Macedonia. A book entitled "Macedonian Children in Poland" (Macedonian: Македонските деца во Полска) was published in Skopje in 1987. Another book, "The Political refugees from Greece in Poland 1948–1975" (Polish: Uchodźcy Polityczni z Grecji w Polsce; 1948–1975) has also been published. In 1989 the "Association of Macedonians in Poland" (Polish: Towarzystwo Macedończyków w Polsce, Macedonian: Друштво на Македонците во Полска) was founded in order to lobby the Greek government to allow the free return of civil war refugee children to Greece.

== Minority status ==
At present, the full legal protection is limited to this national minorities which are groups of Polish citizens, are "old", "native" and on non-immigrant origin. This perspective has caused that the groups of Greeks and Macedonians who have been recognized as national minorities from the 1950s, from the beginning of the 1990s are not treated as national minorities by the state.

Answering a question by Brunon Synak, President of the Kashubian-Pomeranian Association, at a meeting organized by the Council of Europe in 2002, Mr. Dobiesław Rzemieniewski, Head of the National Minorities Division in the Ministry of Internal Affairs and Administration, explained that Greeks and Macedonians are "not classified as national minorities since they do not meet the requirement of being traditionally domiciled on the territory of the Republic of Poland".

Macedonian language studies have been held at the University of Silesia in Katowice since 1987/1988.

== See also ==
- North Macedonia–Poland relations
- Macedonian diaspora
- Immigration to Poland
- Refugees of the Greek Civil War in Poland
- Greeks in Poland
