= Hümeyra Şahin =

Second Lady of Turkey from 2022 to 2023

Second Lady of Turkey
- In office 22 July 2022 – 4 June 2023
- Vice President: Fuat Oktay
- Preceded by: Semiha Yıldırım
- Succeeded by: Tülay Yılmaz

Counselor to the President
- Incumbent
- Assumed office 2018
- President: Recep Tayyip Erdoğan

President of the Meridyen Association
- In office 2009–2012
- Preceded by: Fatma Bayram
- Succeeded by: Saliha Büyükdeniz

Personal details
- Born: 1976 (age 49–50) Istanbul, Turkey
- Spouse: Fuat Oktay (m. 2022)
- Education: Istanbul University (BA), Marmara University (MA), Rome Business School (MA)
- Occupation: Historian, author

Havva Hümeyra Şahin (born 1976) is a Turkish historian, who has served as a counselor to the president of Turkey, currently Recep Tayyip Erdoğan, since 2018. A member of the Presidential Culture and Art Policies Board, she married the vice president of Turkey, then Fuat Oktay, on 22 July 2022, which made her the second lady of Turkey. Because the office of prime minister of Turkey was abolished in 2018 after the 2017 Turkish constitutional referendum, she is the first second lady to be the spouse of a vice president. She served as the president of the Meridyen Association, an association related to social sciences, from 2009 to 2012.

She was born in Istanbul in 1976. After graduating from the Istanbul University Department of History in 1998, she completed her master's degree on Ottoman bureaucratic modernization at the Marmara University. She entered the master's program in arts and culture management at the Rome Business School. Her story book "Lacivert" was published in 2012. Hümeyra Şahin is also known for her columns in the newspaper Akşam.
