= Merilo =

Merilo is an Estonian surname. Notable people with the surname include:

- Andrus Merilo (born 1973), Estonian military commander
- Jaanika Merilo (born 1979), Ukrainian-Estonian politician, philanthropist and author
- Kärt Kross-Merilo (born 1968), Estonian actress

== See also ==
- Merilo Pravednoye, Kievan Rus' manuscript
