= Estonians in Ukraine =

Ethnic minority in Ukraine

Estonians in Ukraine (Estonian: Eestlased Ukrainas, Ukrainian: Естонці в Україні, romanized: Estontsi v Ukraïni) refer to an ethnic group in Ukraine. The first Estonian settlements appeared on the territory of modern Ukraine in the 1860s. According to the Ukrainian Census (2001), 2,868 Estonians lived in Ukraine, the majority in Crimea (2.92% of the whole population). Those Estonians from Crimea are known as Krimmi eestlased (Crimean Estonians).

== History ==
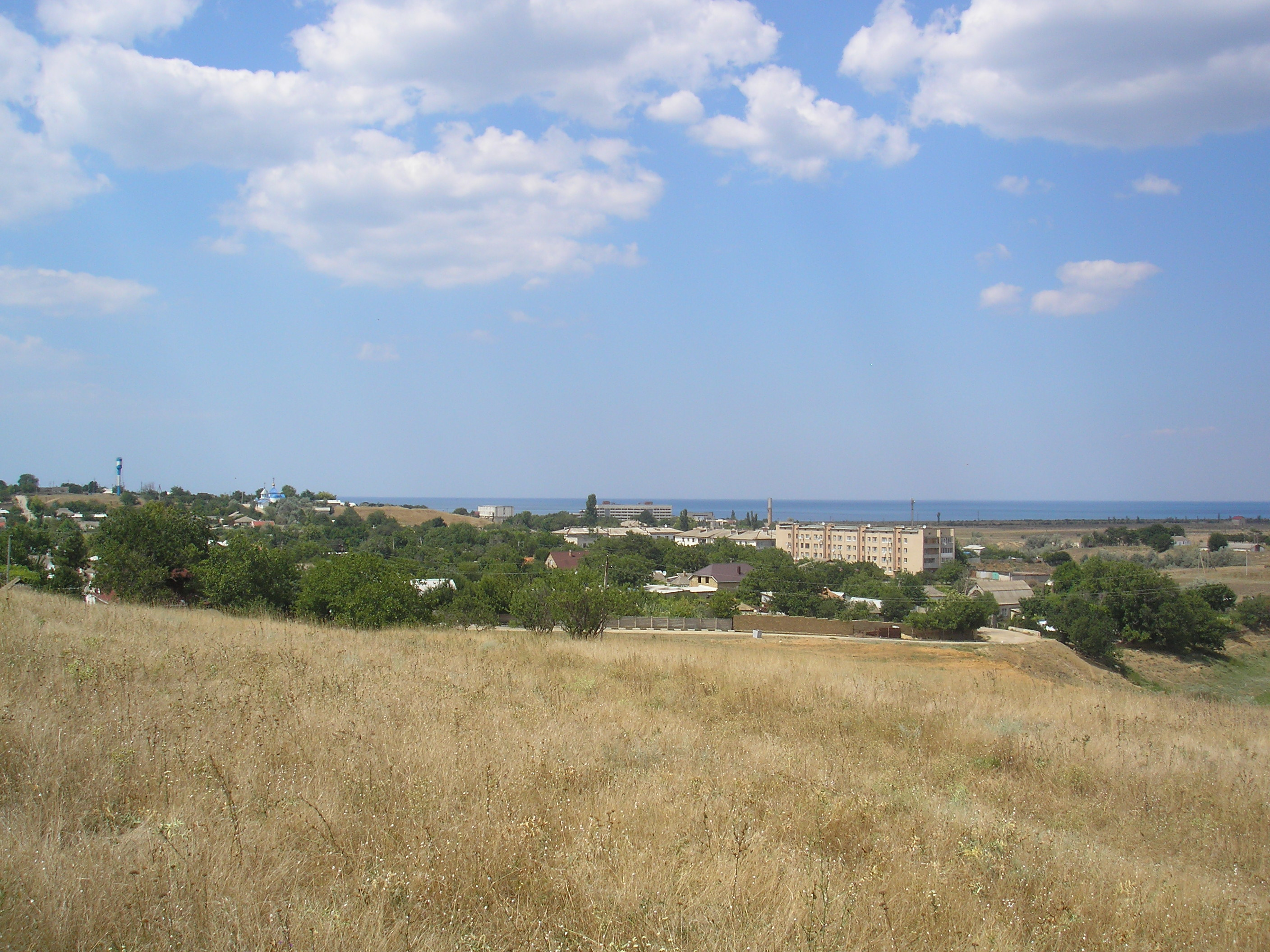
Beregovoe in August 2011.

The first settlements of Estonians on the territory of Ukraine appeared in the Crimea in the 1860s and were founded by the followers of Juhan Leinberg. The first Estonian immigrants arrived in Perekop in May 1861. The Imperial Russian Government allocated 36,000 acres of land in 40 villages for Estonians in Simferopol and other counties of Taurida Governorate. After the Russian Revolution and the Ukrainian War of Independence, the number of Estonians on the territory of Ukraine increased primarily as a result of military and labor migrations.

In the 1924, there were 5 Estonian first primary schools in Crimea, in which 131 students studied. According to the 1989 census of the Ukrainian SSR, the number of Estonians was 4,208 people, of which 30% indicated Estonian as their native language. In 1994, the Ukrainian Estonian Society was founded in Kyiv, with branches also appearing in Kharkiv, Odesa, and Lviv.

In 2016, a representative of the Estonian-Crimean community said that "during the last two years, the Estonian state has terminated relations with the Estonian community of Crimea and aid for the development of national culture and the preservation of the Estonian language" as a result of the Annexation of Crimea by the Russian Federation.

Before the annexation, Estonia had an agreement with Ukraine to send a teacher to the Estonian language Aleksandrovka School in Crimea.

== Estonian villages in Crimea ==
- Beregove, Bakhchysarai Raion (also known by its Estonian name of Rannaküla)
- Pervomaiske

== Associations ==
- Ukrainian Estonian Society (founded in 1994)
- Estonian Society of Sevastopol
- Estonian Cultural Society of Crimea (founded on September 8, 1997)

== Notable people ==
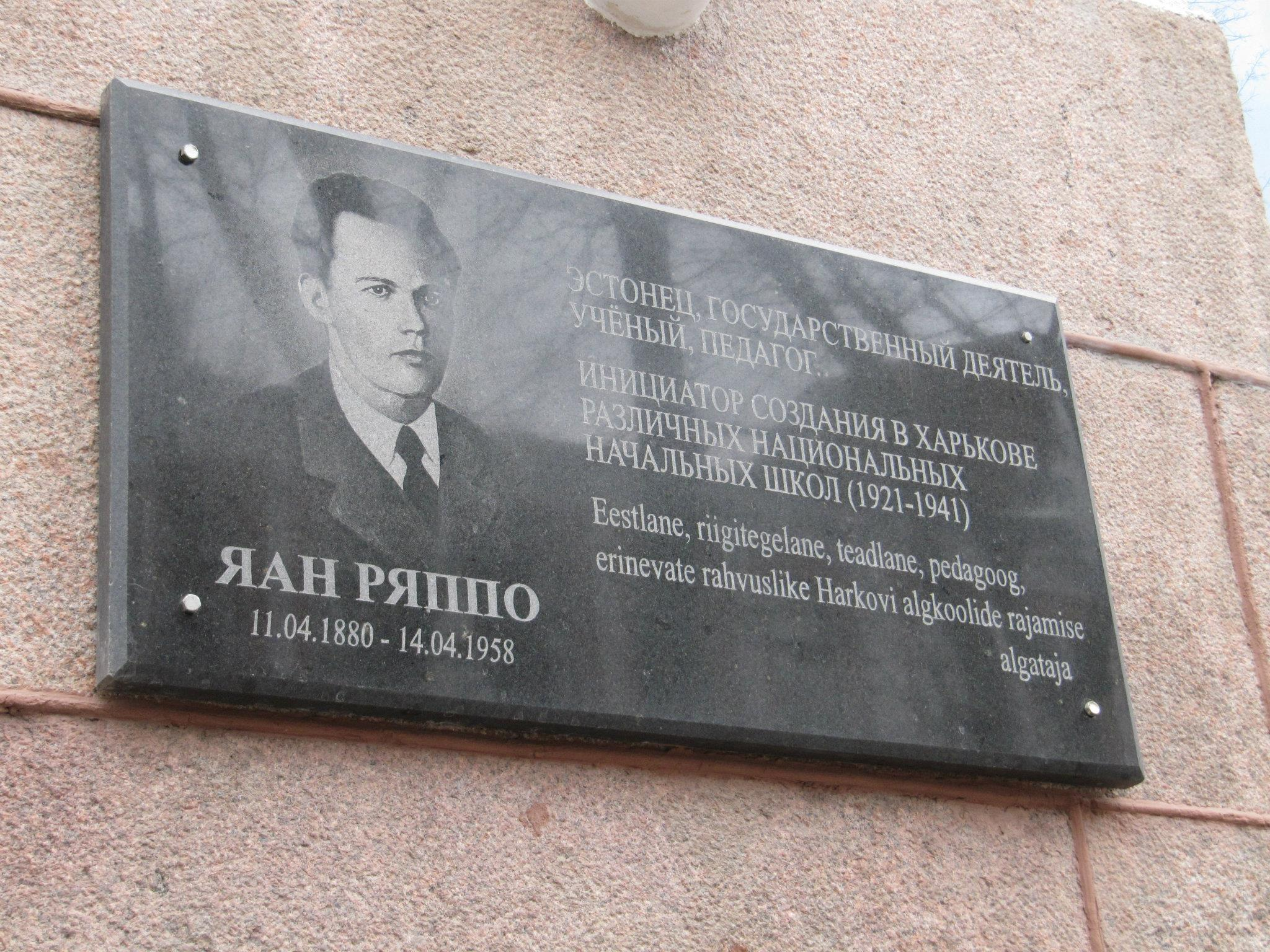
Memorial plaque to Jan Rappo on the facade of the H.S. Skovoroda Kharkiv National Pedagogical University.

- Jaanika Merilo, advisor to the Deputy Prime Minister of Ukraine
- Mykola Azarov, former Prime Minister of Ukraine
- Jaan Räppo, Estonian pedagogue and cultural figure.

== See also ==
- Estonia–Ukraine relations
- Ukrainian diaspora
- Ukrainians in Estonia
- Baltic Russians
