= Omoniyi Ibietan =

Nigerian writer, public official, author and academic

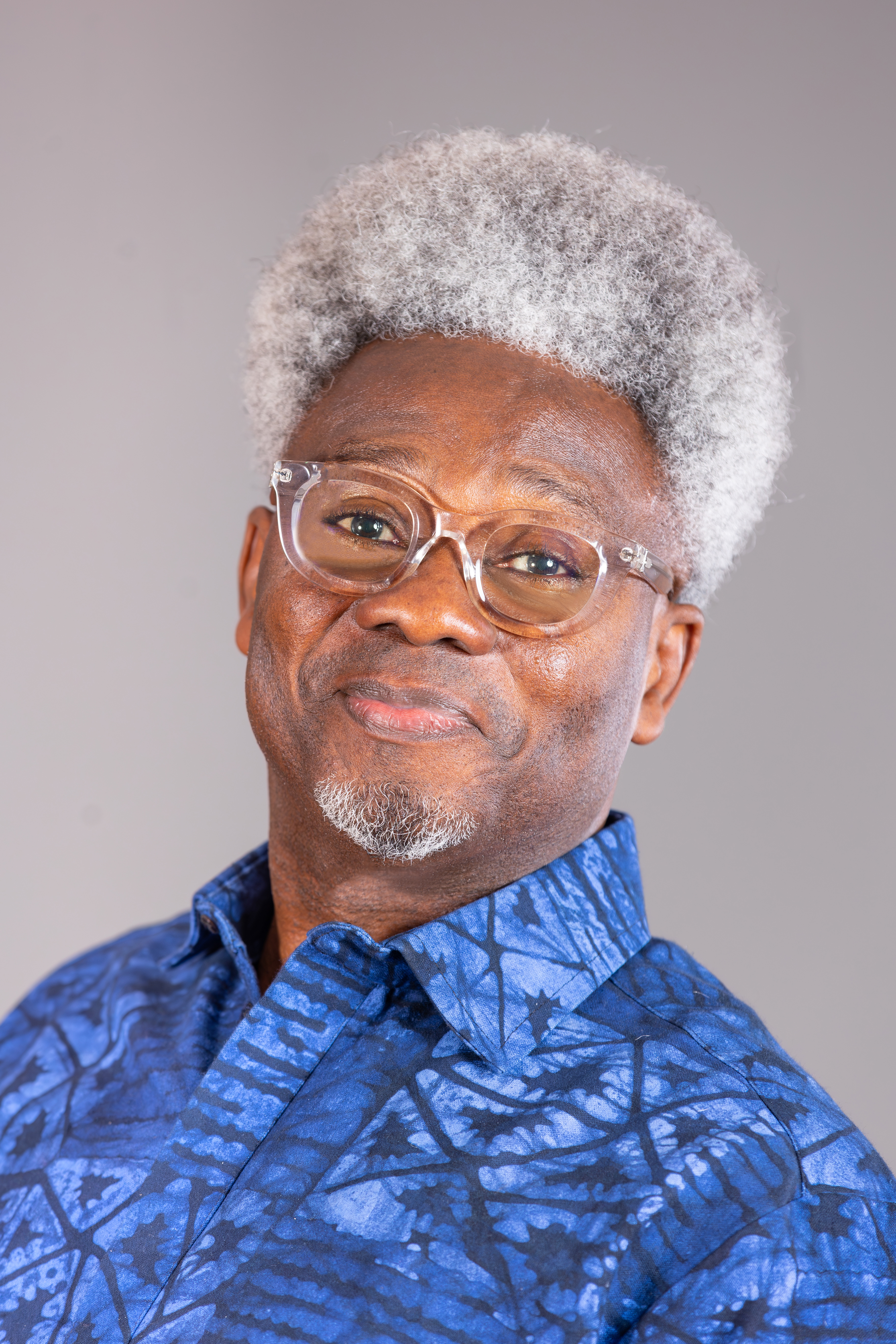
- Born: Kaduna, Nigeria
- Citizenship: Nigerian
- Occupations: Writer, author, journalist, academic

Omoniyi Ibietan (born 19 April 1970 in Kaduna, Nigeria) is a Nigerian writer, journalist, and author, who was also a Special Media Adviser to Nigeria's Minister of Information and Communication, Frank Nweke.

== Life ==
=== Career ===
Ibietan was appointed as the Head of Media Relations of the Nigerian Communications Commission (NCC) in 2022, in a career that has lasted over twenty years in journalism, academia, and public relations. Before his current role, Ibietan was the Head of Online Media at the NCC, and also worked at Nigeria's Federal Ministry of Information and Communication, where he was Special Media Adviser to Nigeria's Minister of Information and Communication. He has been involved in engaging the National Assembly (Nigeria) on behalf of the Nigerian Communications Commission as part of his duties.

He is the Secretary-General of the African Public Relations Association (APRA) following his election at the association's 35th annual general meeting in Abidjan, Côte d'Ivoire in May 2024, for which Nigeria's Minister of Information and National Orientation, Mohammed Idris Malagi, commended him.

Ibietan is a fellow of the Nigerian Institute of Public Relations (NIPR), a member of the African Council for Communication Education (ACCE), an Associate Registered Practitioner of Advertising (ARPA), and a member of the International Institute of Communications (IIC). He lectures postgraduate students at the Nigerian campus of Rome Business School, where he is also a faculty member.

In 2021, Ibietan was elected as chairman of the national convention of the National Association of Nigerian Students (NANS). Prior to this appointment, he was a leader at the National Association of Nigerian Students (NANS).

As a student leader and activist, Ibietan was appointed as the Secretary General of the Student Government, Kwara State College of Technology, a position he held until 1989

=== Writing ===
Ibietan is the author of the book titled Social Media, Social Demography, and Voting Behaviour in Nigeria. He was commended by the Executive Vice Chairman of NCC, Professor Umar Danbatta, at the book launch for his "passion to write a book on cyberpolitics."

=== Activism ===
Ibietan was quite involved in human rights activism as a student leader. His involvement in a protest against a student levy led to his suspension, which he challenged in court, leading the school to recall him to resist the West African School Certificate examinations.

=== Awards & Recognition ===
In July 2025, Ibietan was recognized as a top PR professional in the Changemakers category of the PR Power List 2025, which recognizes "individuals who are actively disrupting the norm and driving innovation" in public relations and communication.

=== Education ===
Ibietan studied at the University of Uyo, and the University of Ibadan, where he earned a bachelor of arts (BA) in Communication Arts and Communication, and an MA in Language Arts, respectively. He also earned a PhD in Communication from the North-West University in South Africa, as well as a mini-MBA in Telecommunications from Neotelis in Paris.
