= Susanna Antequera =

Spanish lawyer and lecturer

- Susanna Antequera Medina
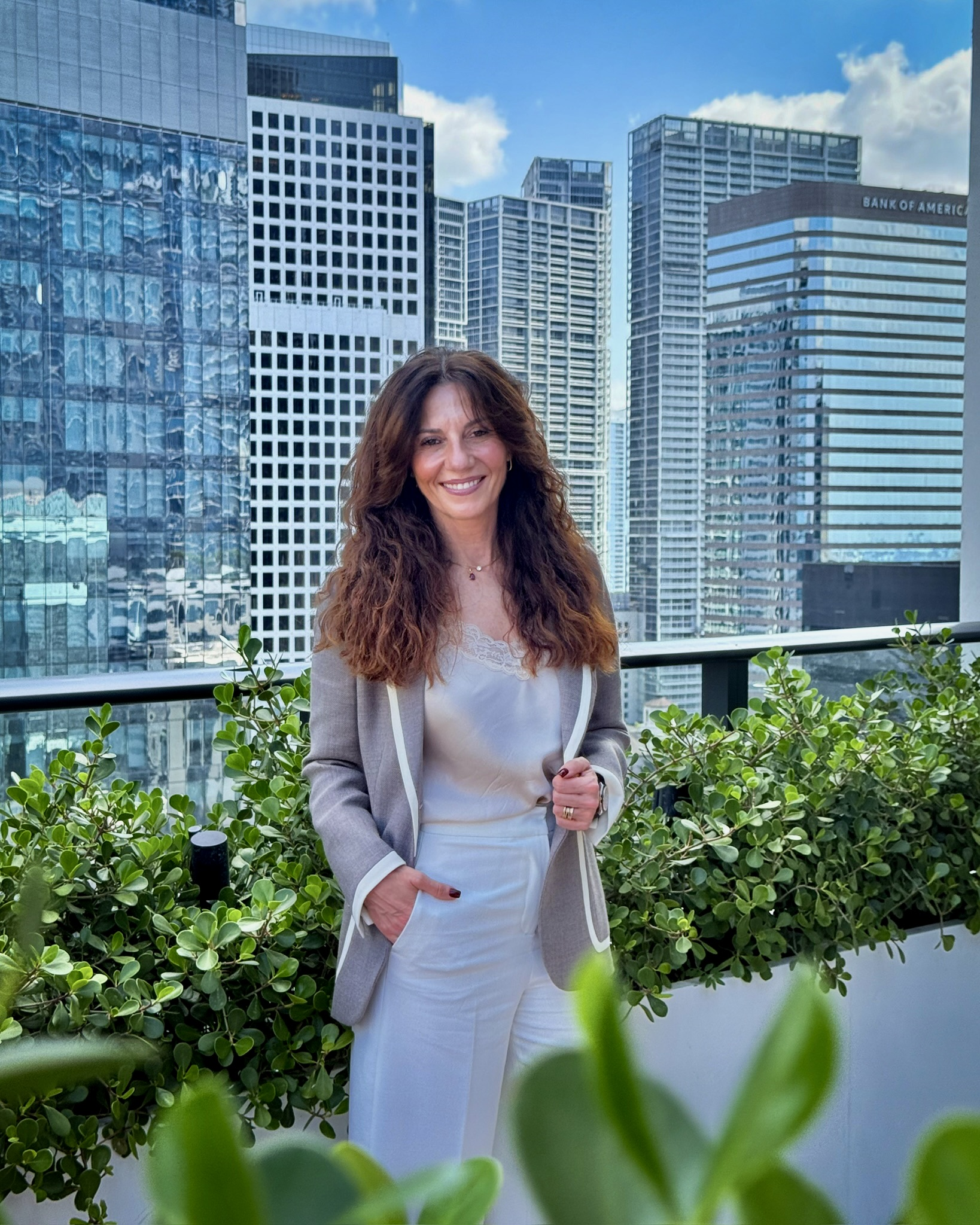
- Born: 1971 (age 54–55); Weinheim, Germany
- Citizenship: Spain
- Education: Bachelor's Degree in Law, Open University of Catalonia
- Occupations: Solicitor specialising in family law and family criminal law
- Organization: Antequera de Jáuregui Abogados de Familia

Susanna Antequera Medina (born in Weinheim in 1971) is a Spanish lawyer and lecturer who specialises in family and criminal family law. In 2016, she founded the law firm Antequera de Jáuregui Abogados de Familia, with offices in Barcelona, Madrid and Miami. She is also an associate professor at the Open University of Catalonia (UOC) and the ISDE Law School in Madrid and Barcelona. Throughout her career, she has received several recognitions.

== Education ==
Born in Weinheim, Germany, she moved to Catalonia at the age of seven and attended the private school Cervetó in Granollers, near Barcelona. She has a Law degree from the Open University of Catalonia. She specialised in family law and holds a Master's degree in Civil, Family and Commercial Mediation from Rey Juan Carlos University in Madrid, a Master's degree in International Family and Succession Law from Carlos III University in Madrid, and an Executive MBA from EAE Business School in Barcelona.

She is a member of various national and international associations, including the Spanish Association of Family Lawyers (AEAFA), the Madrid Association of Family and Children's Lawyers (AMAFI), the International Association of Family Lawyers (AIJUDEFA), the International Union of Lawyers (UIA) the Spanish Chamber of Commerce in Miami, the Women Leaders of America Platform, the US Chamber of Commerce for Women, Women in a Legal World, the Association of Professionals Against International Child Abduction, and the Spanish Society of Legal Psychiatry. She is a member of Forbes House Madrid.

== Career ==
She began her career working as a qualified officer in the court attorney sector, before joining law firms in Barcelona. In 2016, she set up her own firm, Antequera de Jáuregui Abogados, which specialises in family and criminal law, family businesses, and international family wealth management (family office).

She is renowned for representing well-known public figures in Spain and has achieved notable agreements to protect the welfare of children affected by family breakdown proceedings. In 2019, she made headlines by securing the first ruling that ordered a man to compensate his ex-wife for concealing the death of their child. Antequera co-founded the Law and Family Platform in 2019 with other renowned professionals. She participates as a speaker at international conferences and legal seminars, including: The IX World Congress on the Rights of Children and Adolescents in Córdoba, Argentina (2022); the III International Congress on Family Law in Seville (2022); the Women Evolution Conference in Barcelona (2025); and the Conference on Catalan Civil Law in Barcelona (2025).

She has appeared as a family law expert in the national and international press, as well as on radio and television.

== Acknowledgements ==
In 2016, she was recognised as one of the top fifty women in management by the Observatory for Women, Economy and Business, which is part of the Barcelona Chamber of Commerce. In 2018, she was featured in the book Biografias Relevantes de Nuestras Emprendedoras (Notable Biographies of our Female Entrepreneurs) in Catalonia for her leadership and empowerment of women.

In 2020, she was nominated for the Legal Practice Excellence Award by the Economist & Jurist Magazine. Also in 2020, she launched a charity initiative to recognise the courage of children affected by confinement during the pandemic, which received press coverage. In 2021, she was chosen to join the Advisory Committee of Experts of the Professional Association of Criminology of the Community of Madrid (CPCM).

In 2022, she was in the Top 100 Women Leaders in Spain and was chosen as the only Spanish lawyer to attend the World Congress on the Rights of Children and Adolescents, which was held in Córdoba, Argentina.

In 2025, she was included in Todo Juristas' list of the 100 Most Prominent Female Lawyers. Forbes Lawyers magazine considers her law firm to be one of the leading firms in Spain, and she was mentioned in a 2025 list of influential women. In spring 2025, she appeared on the cover of Ejecutiva Magazine, the leading latin magazine for businesswomen in South Florida.
