= Ukrainians in Estonia =

Ethnic minority in Estonia

Ukrainians in Estonia (Ukrainian: Українці в Естонії, romanized: Ukrayintsi v Estoniyi; Estonian: Eesti ukrainlased) are the third largest ethnic group in Estonia after Estonians and Russians and number 28,000. 4,000 out of them are citizens of Ukraine.

Most of the Ukrainians in Estonia live in Tallinn (2,92% of the whole population) and Harjumaa; some live in Tartu and Pärnu. The representatives of the Ukrainian ethnic minority have formed over 20 national-cultural organizations. Most of the Ukrainians in Estonia support the integration of non-Estonians into Estonian society, while retaining their own cultural and ethnic particularities.

== History ==
The first data on the number of ethnic Ukrainians on the territory of Estonia appeared only during the 1959 Soviet population census. In the 1922 census of the interwar Estonia, only the following nationalities were listed: Estonians, Russians, Germans, Swedes, Jews, Latvians, Lithuanians, Poles, Finns, and Ingrians — therefore, Ukrainians either identified themselves as Russians or were counted among “other nationalities.” According to the 1934 census, there were 92 Ukrainians in Estonia.

According to data from the Ministry of Internal Affairs of Estonia in 2011, there were more than 22,000 people from Ukraine living in the country, of whom over 4,000 held Ukrainian citizenship. The vast majority of them were blue-collar workers. Their compact settlements are found mainly in the largest cities of Estonia — Tallinn, Tartu, Pärnu, and Maardu. At the same time, a significant number of Ukrainians live in the northeastern region of Estonia (the cities of Narva, Sillamäe, Kohtla-Järve, and Jõhvi), where during the Soviet era, specialists in the chemical industry and miners from Ukraine were sent to work.

== Demographics ==
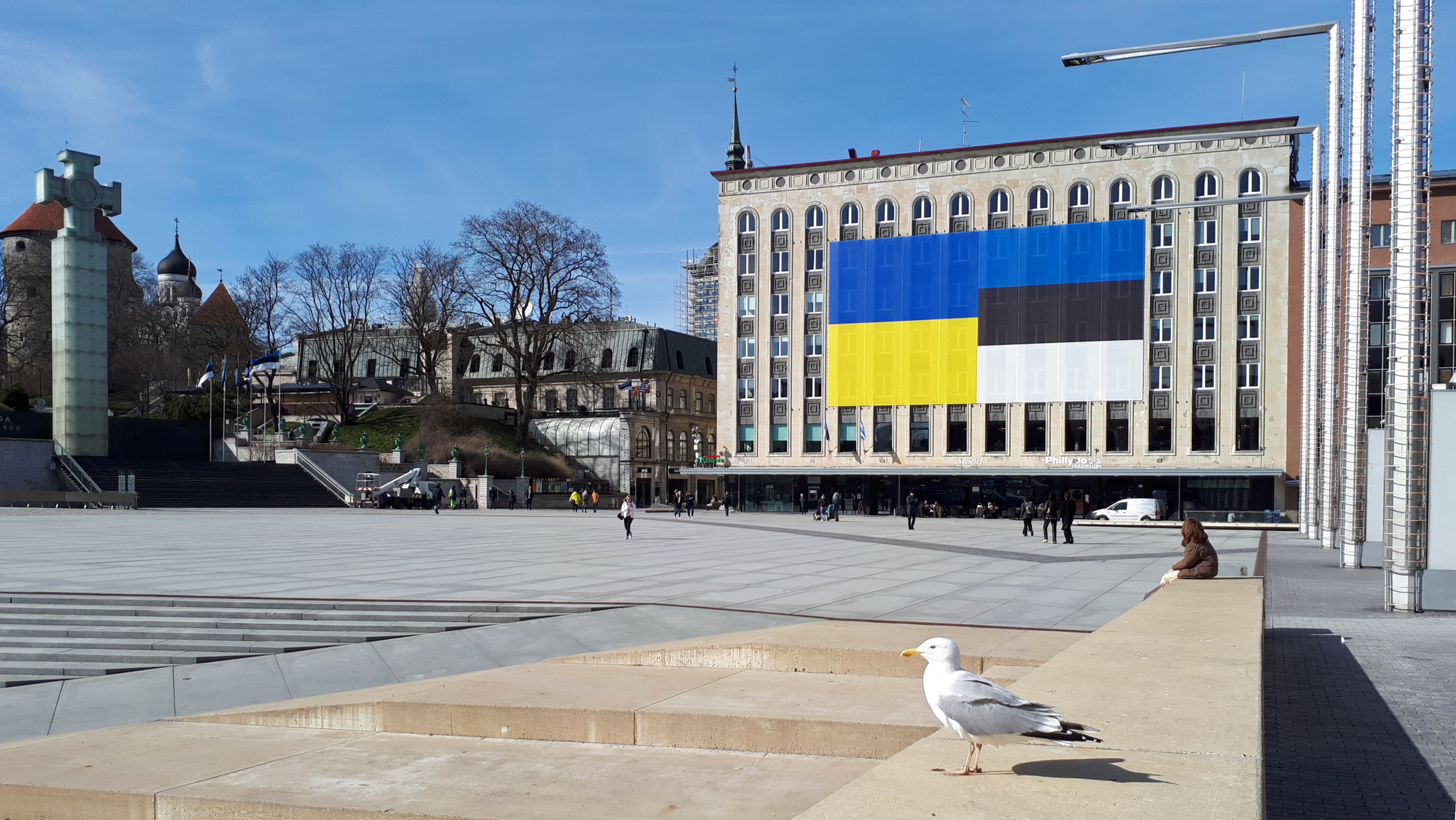
The flags of Ukraine and Estonia at Freedom Square, Tallinn, April 2022

According to the 2021 population census, the number of Ukrainians in Estonia amounted to 27,828 people (2.09% of the total population of Estonia; this number does not include refugees from Ukraine). In 2021:

- 15,450 Ukrainians (55.52% of all Ukrainians in Estonia) lived in Tallinn;
- 18,886 (67.87%) — in Harju County;
- 3,265 (11.73%) — in Ida-Viru County;
- 1,140 (4.1%) — in Narva;
- 1,107 (3.98%) — in Tartu;
- 1,079 (3.88%) — in Kohtla-Järve;
- 957 (3.44%) — in Maardu.

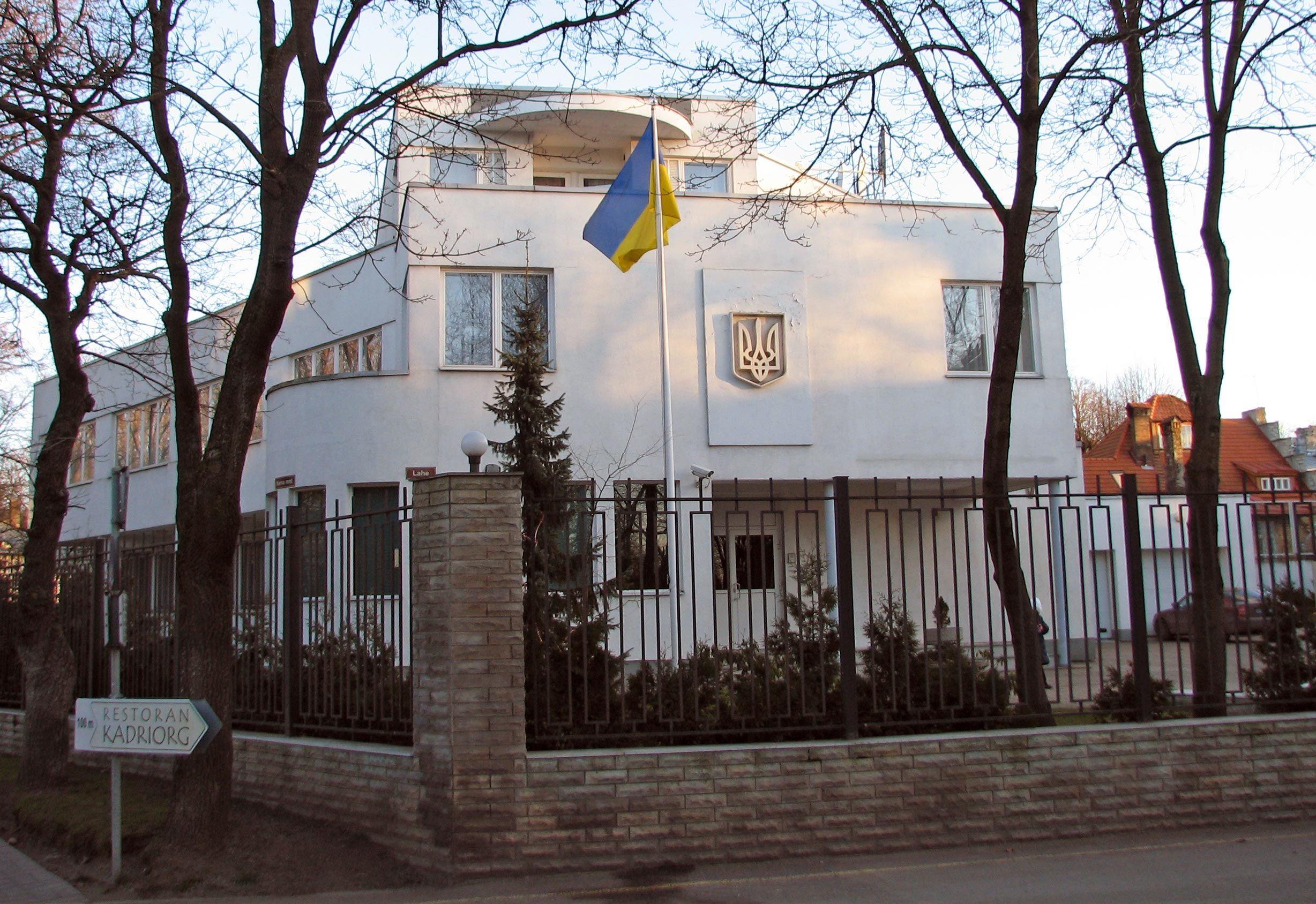
Embassy of Ukraine in Tallinn

As of January 1, 2022, the number of Ukrainians in Estonia was 27,826 people (2.1% of the country’s population). After the start of Russia’s full-scale invasion of Ukraine, according to official data as of November 1, 2022, more than 115,000 Ukrainian refugees (including both ethnic Russians and ethnic Ukrainians) arrived in Estonia, of whom 62,656 people remained in the country.

Share of Ukrainians in the total population of Estonia’s counties in 2017, according to the Estonian Statistics Department:
	Total population	Ukrainians			Total population	Ukrainians	
	Total population	person	%		Total population	person	%
Estonia	1,315,635	23,183	1.76%	Pärnu	82,535	852	1.03%
Valga	30,084	470	2.59%	Põlva	27,963	142	0.51%
Viljandi	47,288	243	0.51%	Rapla	34,085	208	0.61%
Võru	33,505	112	0.33%	Saare	33,307	72	0.22%
Ida-Viru	143,880	3,350	2.33%	Tartu*	145,550	1,223	0.84%
Jõgeva	30,840	176	0.57%	Harju*	582,556	15,078	2.59%
Lääne	24,301	238	0.98%	Hiiu	9,335	16	0.17%
Lääne-Viru	58,855	684	1.16%	Järva	30,379	297	0.98%

* including in 2017

Cities	Total population	Ukrainians	
Cities	Total population	%	
Tallinn	426,538	12,335	2,91
Tartu	93,124	957	0,91

The share of Ukrainians in the total population of Estonia’s counties in 2021, according to the population census:
	Total population	Ukrainians			Total population	Ukrainians	
	Total population		%		Total population		%
Estonia	1,331,824	27,828	2,09%	Pärnu	85,710	1,171	1,37%
Valga	27,651	451	1,63%	Põlva	23,991	133	0,55%
Viljandi	45,413	315	0,69%	Rapla	33,529	247	0,74%
Võru	34,180	139	0,41%	Saare	31,292	84	0,27%
Ida-Viru	132,741	3,265	2,46%	Tartu*	157,760	1,507	0,96%
Jõgeva	27,858	184	0,66%	Harju*	614,567	18,886	3,07%
Lääne	20,229	199	0,98%	Hiiu	8,497	16	0,19%
Lääne-Viru	58,709	818	1,39%	Järva	29,697	413	1,39%

* including in 2021 census

Cities	Total population	Ukrainians	
Cities	Total population		%
Tallinn	437,817	15,450	3,53%
Tartu	98,313	1,128	1,15%

The number of Ukrainians in Estonia, including in Tallinn, according to the All-Union population censuses of the USSR and the Statistics Department of Estonia
Year	Ukrainians in Estonia		Ukrainians in Tallinn	
Year	persons	% of total population of Estonia	persons	% of total Ukrainians in Estonia
1959	15,769	1,32	7 277	46,2
1970	↗ 28,085	↗ 2,07	↗ 13 309	47,4
1979	↗ 36,044	↗ 2,46	↗ 18 116	50,2
1989	↗ 48 271	↗ 3,08	..	..
2000	↘ 29,012	↘ 2,12	..	..
2011	↘ 22,573	↘ 1,74	↘ 15,108	66,9
2012	↗ 23,285	↗ 1,76	↘ 14,956	64,2
2013	↘ 22,972	↘ 1,74	↘ 14,841	64,6
2014	↘ 22,951	→ 1,74	↗ 14,851	64,7
2015	↘ 22,562	↘ 1,72	↗ 14,873	65,9
2016	↗ 23,256	↗ 1,77	↗ 15,037	64,7
2017	↘ 23,183	↘ 1,76	↗ 15,179	65,5
2018	↗ 23,310	↗ 1,77	↗ 12,514	65,8
2019	↗ 23,665	↗ 1,79	↗ 12,717	65,5
2020	↗ 24,897	↗ 1,87	↗ 13,559	63,5
2021	↗ 27,254	↗ 2,05	↗ 15,265	61,9
2022	↗ 27,826	↗ 2,09	↗ 15,449	60,6
2023	↗ 55,675	↗ 4,08	↗ 28,775	51,7

=== Country of birth, citizenship, and native language ===
Countries of birth of Ukrainians in Estonia according to the population censuses of 2000, 2011, and 2021:
Countries	2000		2011		2021	
Countries	persons	% of total Ukrainians	persons	% of total Ukrainians	persons	% of total Ukrainians
Estonia	7,890	27,2%	6,324	↗ 28,0	6,087	↘ 21,9
Ukraine	17,766	61,2%	14,015	↘ 62,1	19 388	↗ 69,7
Russia	2,134	7,4%	1,342	↘ 5,9	1,351	↘ 4,9
Other countries	1,222	4,2%	892	↘ 4,0	1,002	↘ 3,6
Total	29,012	100	22 573	100	27 828	100

Citizenship and native language of Ukrainians in Estonia according to the population censuses of 2000, 2011, and 2021:
Year/native language	Total Ukrainians	Estonian citizenship	Russian citizenship	Citizenship of another countries	Without citizenship
2000 / Total	29,012	8,423	5,217	2,521	12,851*
2000 / Ukrainian	11,923	3,010	2,269	1,665	4,979*
2000 / Russian	16,486	5.016	2,927	836	7,707*
2000 / Estonian	481	352	6	14	109*
2000 / Belarusian	27	4	5	1	17
2000/ Other or undetermined	95	41	10	5	24*
2011 / Total	22,573	8,383	4,083	4,023	6,084
2011 / Ukrainian	7,601	2,161	1,314	2,278	1,848
2011 / Russian	14,461	5,822	2,753	1,714	4,172
2011 / Estonian	456	379	9	17	51
2011 / Other or undetermined	55	21	7	14	13
2021 / Total	27,828	7,927	3,094	12,429	4,378
2021 / Ukrainian	11,904	1,857	897	7,871	1,279
2021 / Russian	15,133	5,519	2,183	4,407	3,024
2021 / Estonian	570	462	5	47	56
2021 / Other or undetermined	221	89	9	104	19

*Including those whose citizenship was not determined.

=== Second nationality and second native language ===
In the 2021 Estonian population census, the term “people of two nationalities” (Estonian: kaherahvuselised inimesed) was introduced for the first time. According to these data, 710 Ukrainians — i.e., 2.6% of all Ukrainians in the country — reported a second nationality. At the same time, 2,260 Russians and 1,180 Estonians indicated Ukrainian as their second nationality.

Ukrainians who indicated their second nationality in the 2021 census:
First nationality	Second nationality (Note: The nationality “Estonian” was not included as a possible second nationality in the census data)				
First nationality	Belarusian	Polish	Jewish	Finnish	Total
Ukrainian	280	260	120	50	710

Number of residents of Estonia who indicated “Ukrainian” as their second nationality in the 2021 census:
First nationality	Second nationality — Ukrainian (persons)
Russian	2,260
Estonian	1,180
Total	3,440

In the 2021 census, the concept of a “second native language” (Estonian: teine emakeel) was also introduced. A total of 3,910 residents of Estonia listed Ukrainian as their second native language.

Residents of Estonia who indicated Ukrainian as their second native language (2021):
Nationality	Second native language — Ukrainian (persons)
Russian	3,810
Estonian	100
Total	3,910

== Education ==
Ukrainians in Estonia aged 10 and older (2021 — aged 15 and older) by level of education according to population censuses
Education Level	2000		2011		2021	
Education Level	persons	Percentage of total Ukrainians aged 10+ / 15+	persons	% of total Ukrainians aged 10+ / 15+	persons.	% of total Ukrainians aged 15+
No education	1,045	3,8%	319	1,5	31	0,1
Primary	2,192	7,9%	783	3,6	334	1,3
Basic	3,767	13,5	2,080	9,5	1,423	5,6
Secondary	6,980	25,0	4,012	18,3	4,365	17,1
Vocational, special and applied	9,145	32,8	10,476	47,9	11,274	44,1
Higher	4,028	14,5	3,804	17,4	7,623	29,8
Doctor of Science, Candidate of Science	26	0,1	92	0,4	157	0,6
Unknown	681	2,4	315	1,4	365	1,4
Total	27,864		21,881		25,572	

== Ukrainian organizations in Estonia ==
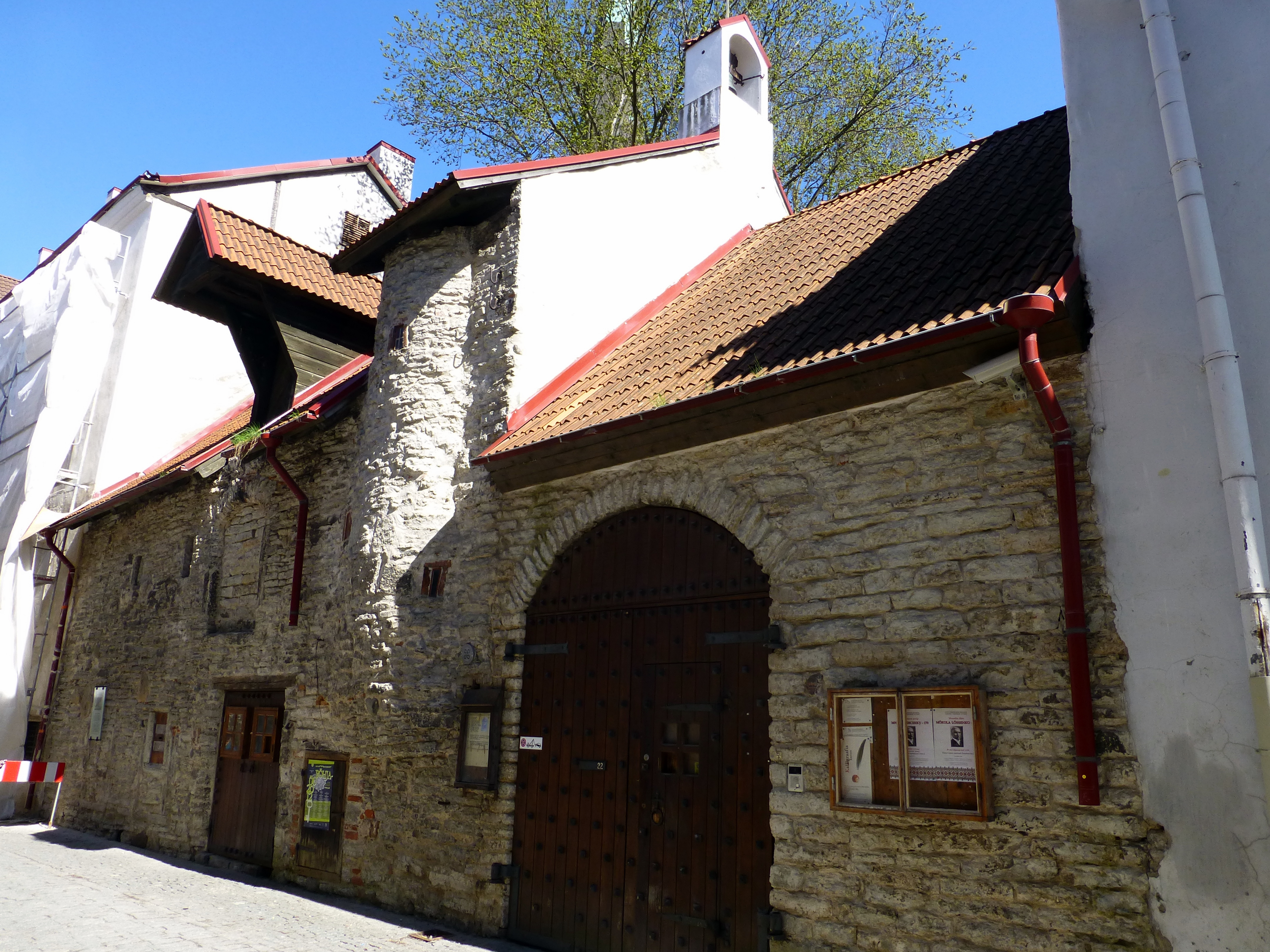
Ukrainian Greek Catholic Church in Tallinn

Representatives of the Ukrainian diaspora in Estonia are united in more than twenty Ukrainian national and cultural societies. Some of them are part of the Congress of Ukrainians in Estonia and the Association of Ukrainian Organizations in Estonia, while others operate independently. These societies function as autonomous regional organizations, each bringing together about fifty to seventy members.

The main focus of the activities of the Ukrainian diaspora organizations in Estonia is cultural and educational. To preserve national culture, native language, traditions, and customs of the Ukrainian people, concerts, exhibitions, and lectures on Ukrainian history are organized, as well as literary and musical evenings dedicated to anniversaries of prominent Ukrainian figures and significant dates in Ukraine’s history.

For many years, the Ukrainian Community of Estonia, founded in 1988 (Chairperson — Vera Konyk, since 2017 — Evhen Tsybulenko), was the only Ukrainian organization in the country whose work was aimed at meeting the cultural and educational needs of Ukrainians in Estonia and preserving their language and folk traditions. Its efforts to promote Ukrainian culture in Estonia were recognized in 2001 with an Honorary Diploma of the Cabinet of Ministers of Ukraine.

In 2002, the Community joined the newly created Congress of Ukrainians of Estonia (Chairperson — Vera Konyk), which now unites more than ten organizations, including:

- Union of Ukrainian Women of Estonia (founded June 1998, Chair — Liliya Chykalska);
- Scout Organization “Plast” (2002, Leader — Bohdan Liutiuk);
- Sports Club “Dnipro” (2003, Leader — Serhii Ishchenko);
- Ukrainian Community of Ida-Virumaa (2000, Chair — Nina Dyachenko);
- Ukrainian Cultural and Educational Society “Stozhary”, Maardu (2000, Chair — Leonid Chupryna);
- Ukrainian Community “Barvinok”, Rakvere (2004, Chair — Tetyana Lindberg);
- Ukrainian Society “Smerichka”, Oisu (2003, Chair — Anna Loovili);
- Ukrainian Community of Narva (1996, Chair — Halyna Malyarova);
- Ukrainian Society of Põlva (2004, Chair — Liliana Cherepakha).

The Congress of Ukrainians of Estonia is centered around the Ukrainian Greek Catholic Church, which shares a building with the Ukrainian Cultural Center (Director — Anatolii Liutiuk). The church operates a Ukrainian Sunday school, a folk crafts school, and a small library.

In August 2007, the Director of the Ukrainian Cultural Center in Tallinn, artist and citizen of the Republic of Estonia A. K. Liutiuk, was awarded the title Honored Artist of Ukraine for his significant personal contribution to strengthening Ukraine’s international reputation, promoting its historical and modern achievements, and on the occasion of the 16th anniversary of Ukrainian independence.

Under the Congress of Ukrainians of Estonia operate various cultural groups, including:

- Women’s vocal group “Echo” (founded 1989, Director — Raisa Demchuk),
- Choir “Mechta” (1998, Tallinn),
- Choir “Rodyna” (1998, Narva),
- Girls’ ensemble “Verbichenka” (2005, Narva),
- Girls’ ensemble “Dzherela” (2004, Maardu),
- Ukrainian theater studio “Artstudio” (1995, Tallinn),
- Ukrainian ritual theater “Vertep” (2001, Maardu),
- Ukrainian Literary Club (2003, Tallinn).

The Congress of Ukrainians of Estonia is a member of the Association of the Peoples of Estonia, the European Congress of Ukrainians, the World Congress of Ukrainians, and the Ukrainian World Coordinating Council. Its representatives participate in the Round Table of National Minorities under the President of Estonia.

The Union of Ukrainian Women of Estonia is a member of the World Federation of Ukrainian Women’s Organizations.

The Association of Ukrainian Organizations in Estonia (AUOE), founded in May 2000 (Chair — Volodymyr Palamar), includes:

- Ukrainian Cultural and Educational Society “Prosvita”, Tallinn (Chair — Oksana Mamutova);
- Union of Ukrainian Youth in Estonia (Chair — Volodymyr Palamar);
- Ukrainian Community of Sillamäe “Vodohrai” (Chair — L. Zhytnyk);
- Youth and Children’s Dance Ensemble “Kolor”, Tallinn (Chair — Nina Koort);
- Cultural and Educational Society “Orpheus”, Tapa (Chair — Liubov Laur);
- Ukrainian Society of Pärnu “Vitchyzna” (Chair — Nina Sushko);
- Ukrainian Cultural Society “Promin”, Tartu (Chair — Mykola Stasiuk).

Within the AUOE function the academic choir “Ukraina” and the women’s vocal ensemble “Sosedki”.

In 2001, the Association received an Honorary Diploma of the Cabinet of Ministers of Ukraine for its contribution to promoting a positive image of Ukraine in the world and its active social work.

Among the amateur art groups of the Ukrainian diaspora in Estonia, the folk ensemble “Zhurba”, founded in 1992, is particularly well known. Its main goal is the revival of Ukrainian folk songs, their popularization among both Ukrainian and Estonian audiences, and the introduction of Estonians to Ukrainian folk clothing, rituals, and traditions.

The ensemble is a member of the International Association of National Cultural Societies “Lira” and the Estonian Folklore Society. In May 2000, with the support of Radio 4, the Ministry of Culture of Estonia, and the Tallinn Department of Culture, the group released an audio cassette. In 2004, it was certified by the Estonian Folklore Society and awarded the highest category. In November 2004, by decision of the Collegium of the Ministry of Culture and Arts of Ukraine, the ensemble Zhurba received the honorary title “People’s Amateur Ensemble”.

=== Ensuring the cultural, linguistic, and other rights of the Ukrainian diaspora ===
According to the Constitution of Estonia, the development of the Estonian nation and the preservation of the cultural traditions of the Estonian people are the main goals of Estonian statehood. At the same time, for non-Estonians living in Estonia, the country's constitution guarantees the opportunity to preserve their language and cultural identity, primarily through the establishment of cultural societies and the provision of education in their native language.

For the Ukrainian population of Estonia, every Saturday on the fourth channel of Estonian Radio, the Ukrainian-language radio program “Chervona Kalyna” is broadcast, covering the socio-political and cultural life of Ukraine and the Ukrainian diaspora in Estonia. Ukrainian weekend schools have been established and are operating in the Ukrainian associations of Tallinn, Sillamäe, Narva, and Maardu.

In addition, a weekly Ukrainian-language children’s program titled “Lyusterko” (“Little Mirror”) is aired on Estonian radio. Its main goal is to help children preserve their native language. The program features Ukrainian songs and fairy tales, as well as various educational and entertaining content for children, including material prepared and provided by the National Radio Company of Ukraine.

From 1999 to 2003, the Ukrainian Association of Estonia published a Ukrainian newspaper titled “Struny” (“Strings”), but its publication was discontinued due to a lack of funding.

Prominent Ukrainians and representatives of Estonia’s scientific, cultural, and artistic elite include sculptor Ivan Zubaka; artists Anatolii Strakhov, Yaryna Ilo, Anatolii Liutiuk, and Nina Vinnik; actors Yevhen Haiduk and Aleksandr Ivashkevich; musician Ruslan Trochynskyi; theater director Yurii Mykhailiov; historian Borys Dubovyk; professor of Slavic philology at the University of Tartu, Oleksandr Dulichenko, and his colleague Lyudmyla Dulichenko; and professor of international law and publicist Yevhen Tsybulenko.

The vast majority of Ukrainians — permanent residents of Estonia who have chosen to build their lives in this country — view positively the idea of integrating ethnic non-Estonians into Estonian society while preserving their own culture, language, and national identity. The Estonian state has created the necessary conditions to support this process.

== Ukrainian refugees in Estonia ==
Protests and solidarity rallies in support of Ukraine in Tallinn

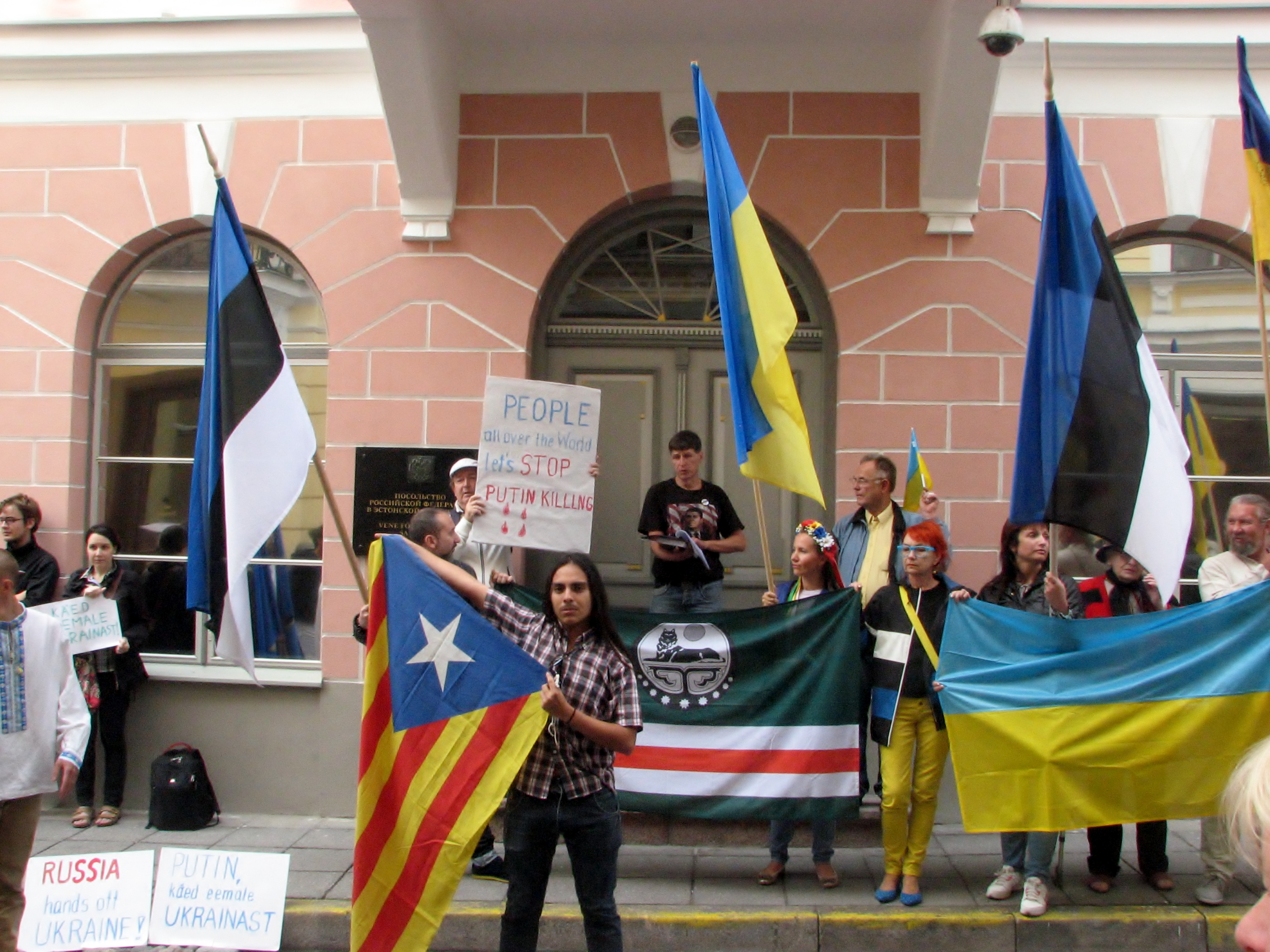
Picket in support of Ukraine in front of the Russian Embassy, August 23, 2014

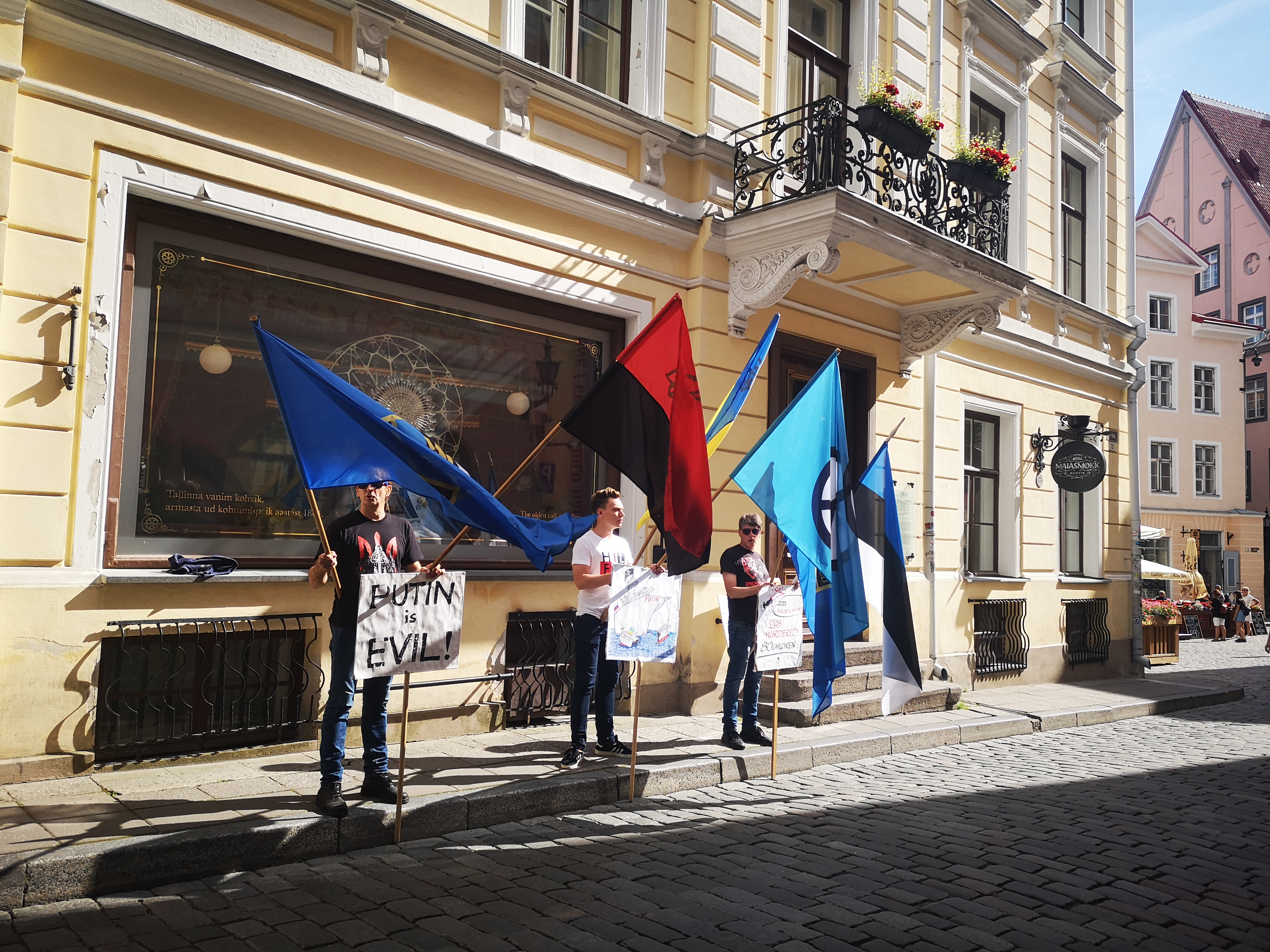
Picket in support of Ukraine in front of the Russian Embassy, July 16, 2020

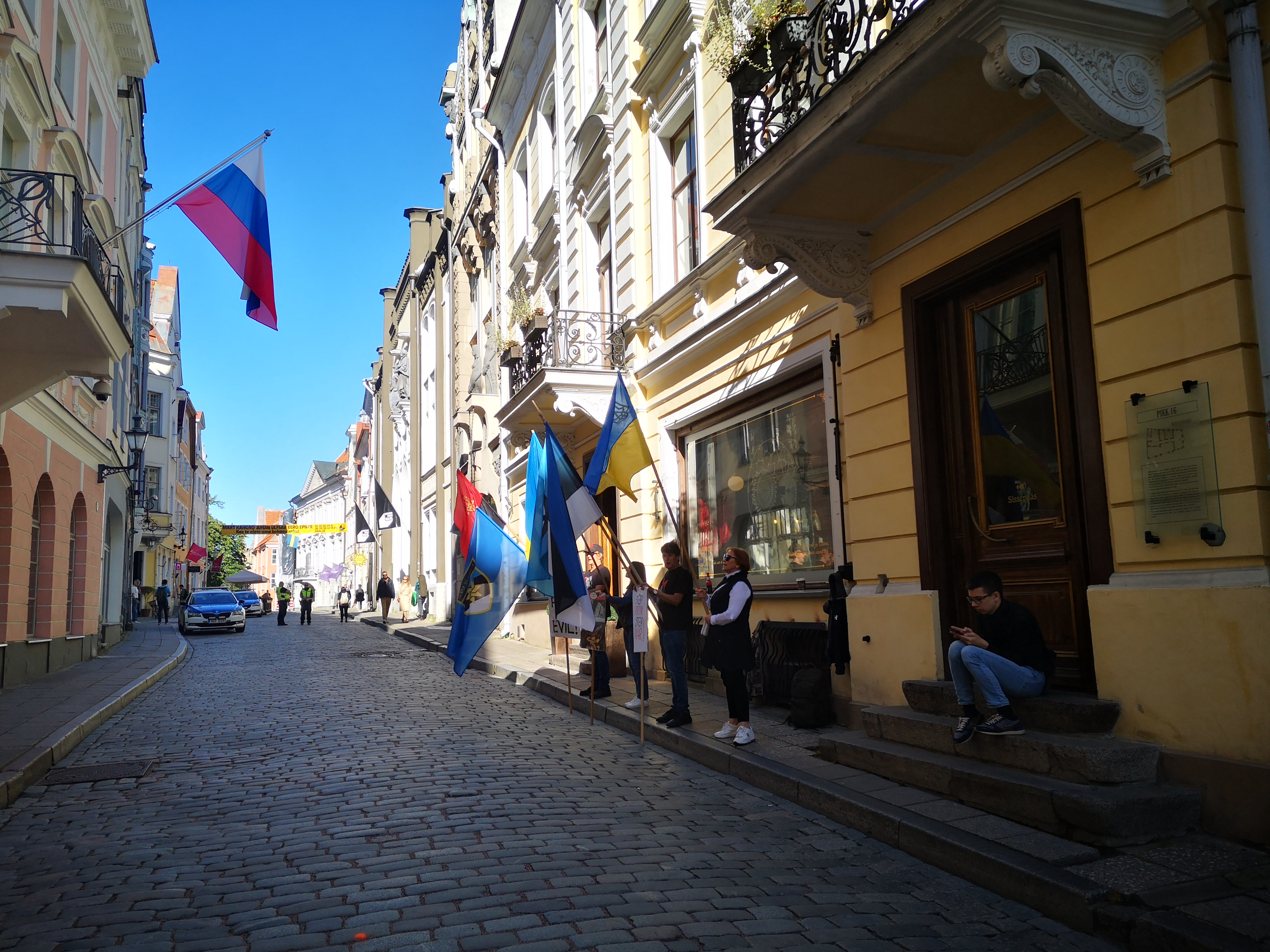
Demonstration every Thursday for Ukraine, August 27, 2020

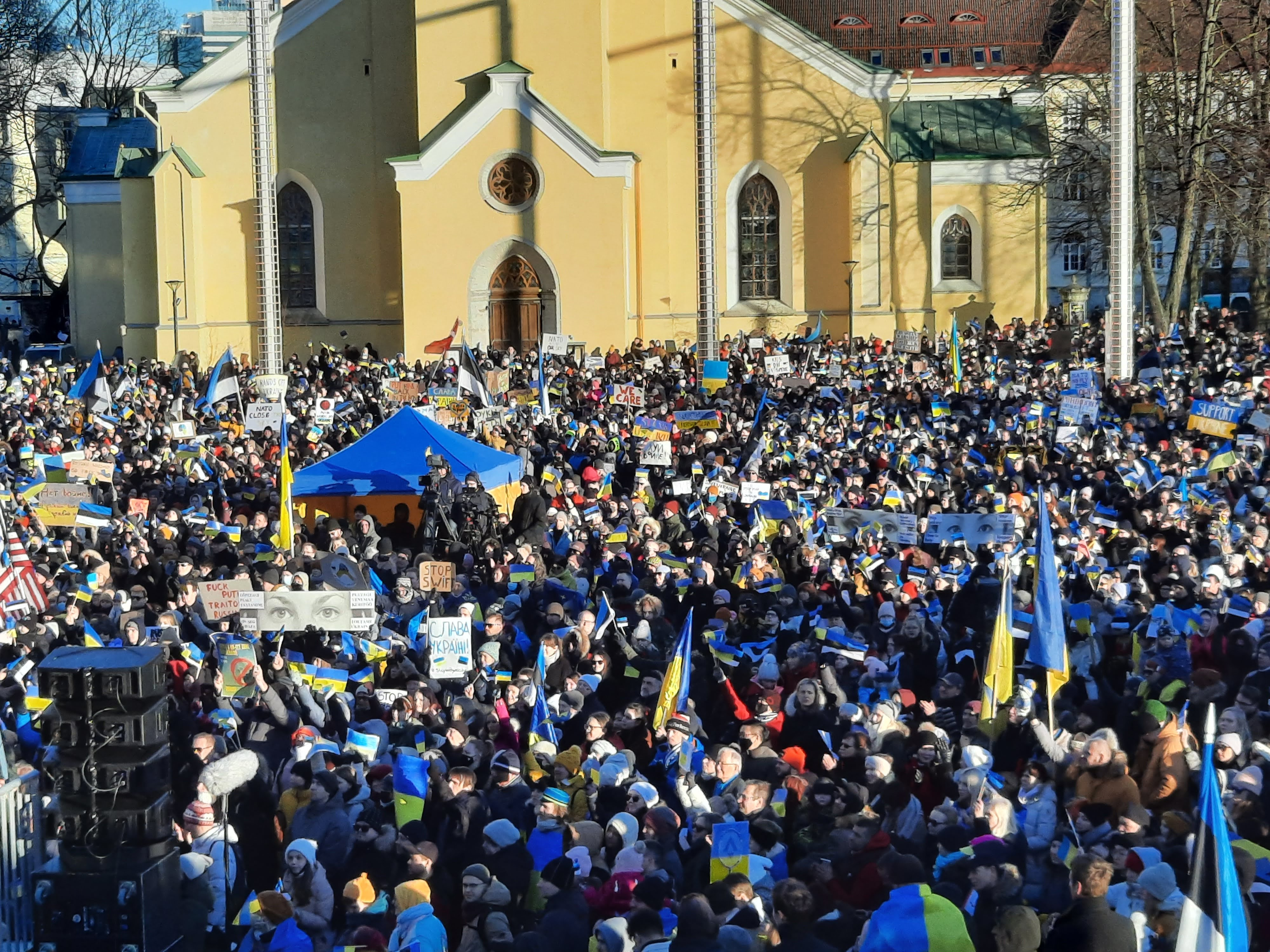
Solidarity rally with Ukraine, February 26, 2022, Freedom Square in Tallinn

According to a decision of the Government of Estonia, Ukrainian citizens and their family members who fled the country following Russia’s invasion of Ukraine, which began on February 24, 2022, are granted temporary protection — that is, a residence permit valid for one year. People who left Ukraine earlier but cannot return due to the ongoing hostilities are allowed to stay in Estonia without a visa.

According to the statistics of reception and information centers established for war refugees, from the start of Russia’s invasion of Ukraine until 31 May 2023, a total of 122,554 war refugees arrived in Estonia from Ukraine. Of these, 55,792 left the country, while 66,762 remained in Estonia; among them, 37,972 people registered (i.e., applied for and received temporary protection).

As of 18 November 2023, 32,146 Ukrainian refugees had registered their place of residence in Estonia; as of 16 February 2024, this number had risen to 32,505. As of 24 April 2023, 48% of registered Ukrainian refugees were living in Tallinn.

As of 31 March 2023, 37% of Ukrainian refugees were under 20 years old, 58% were aged 20–64, and 6% were 65 years and older.

As of 31 October 2023, 4,112 Ukrainian refugees were registered with the Estonian Unemployment Insurance Fund, and as of 31 January 2024, the number was 3,980.

In Estonia’s education system, as of 2 October 2023, there were 8,919 Ukrainian students registered, with the largest number — 4,924 — in Harju County. Among them, 5,942 studied in Estonian, 304 were enrolled in intensive Estonian language immersion programs, and 2,637 studied in Russian.

In 2022, the School of Freedom (Estonian: Vabaduse kool; Ukrainian: Школа Свободи, romanized: Shkola Svobody) was established at the Tallinn Tõnismäe State Gymnasium to serve Ukrainian refugees. The school accommodates 800 students in grades 7–12. Instruction at the School of Freedom follows the language immersion method, with at least 60% of lessons taught in Estonian and up to 40% in Ukrainian.

== Notable people ==
- Jaanika Merilo, digital reform specialist

== See also ==
- Estonia–Ukraine relations
- Ukrainian diaspora
- Russians in Estonia
- Estonians in Ukraine
- Ukrainians in Finland
- Ukrainians in Sweden
