= Estonia–Ukraine relations =

Bilateral relations between Ukraine and Estonia

- Estonia: Ukraine

Estonia and Ukraine established diplomatic relations on 4 January 1992. Relations between the two countries have remained consistently close, largely in part due to shared concerns of any aspirations of the Russian Federation. Estonia is a member of the European Union, which Ukraine applied for in 2022. Both countries are full members of the Council of Europe. Estonia supports Ukraine's accession negotiations with the European Union and NATO.

== History ==
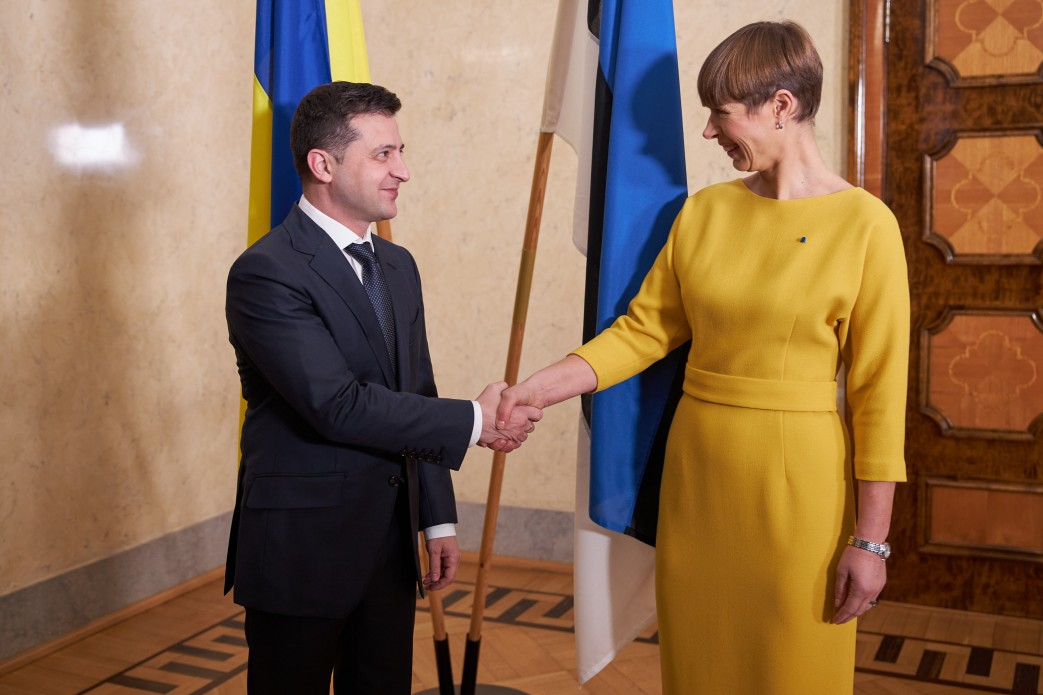
President of Ukraine Volodymyr Zelenskyy and Estonian President Kersti Kaljulaid meet during a state visit in 2019.

Estonia and the Ukrainian Soviet Socialist Republic recognized each other with an agreement signed on November 25, 1921.

After the collapse of the Soviet Union, the two countries re-recognized each other on August 26, 1991. Bilateral diplomatic relations between the two countries were re-established on January 4, 1992. An agreement on cooperation between Ukraine and Estonia was signed on May 26, 1992.

== Russian Invasion of Ukraine ==
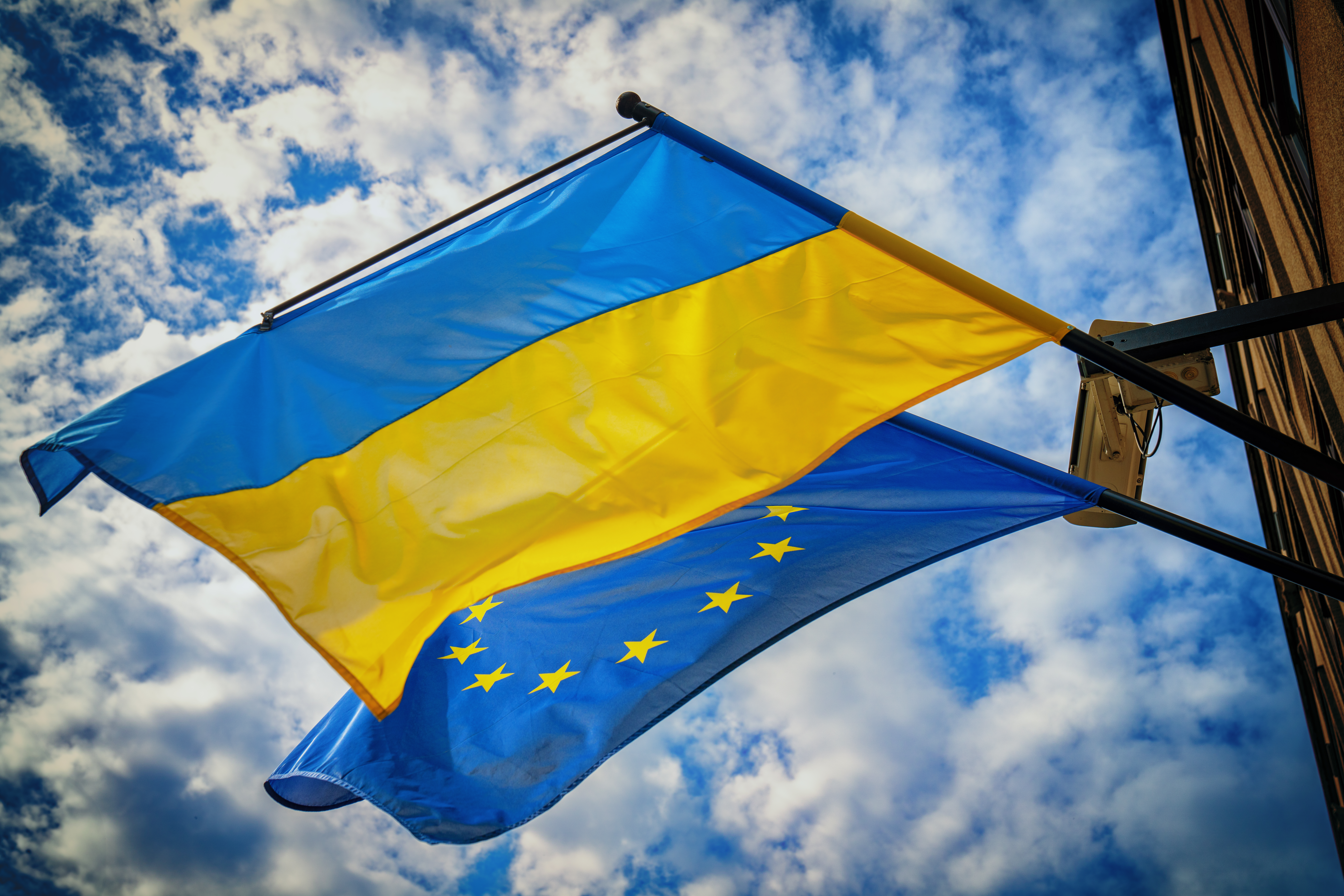
The Ukrainian and EU flags flying outside the Estonian Ministry of Defence in 2024

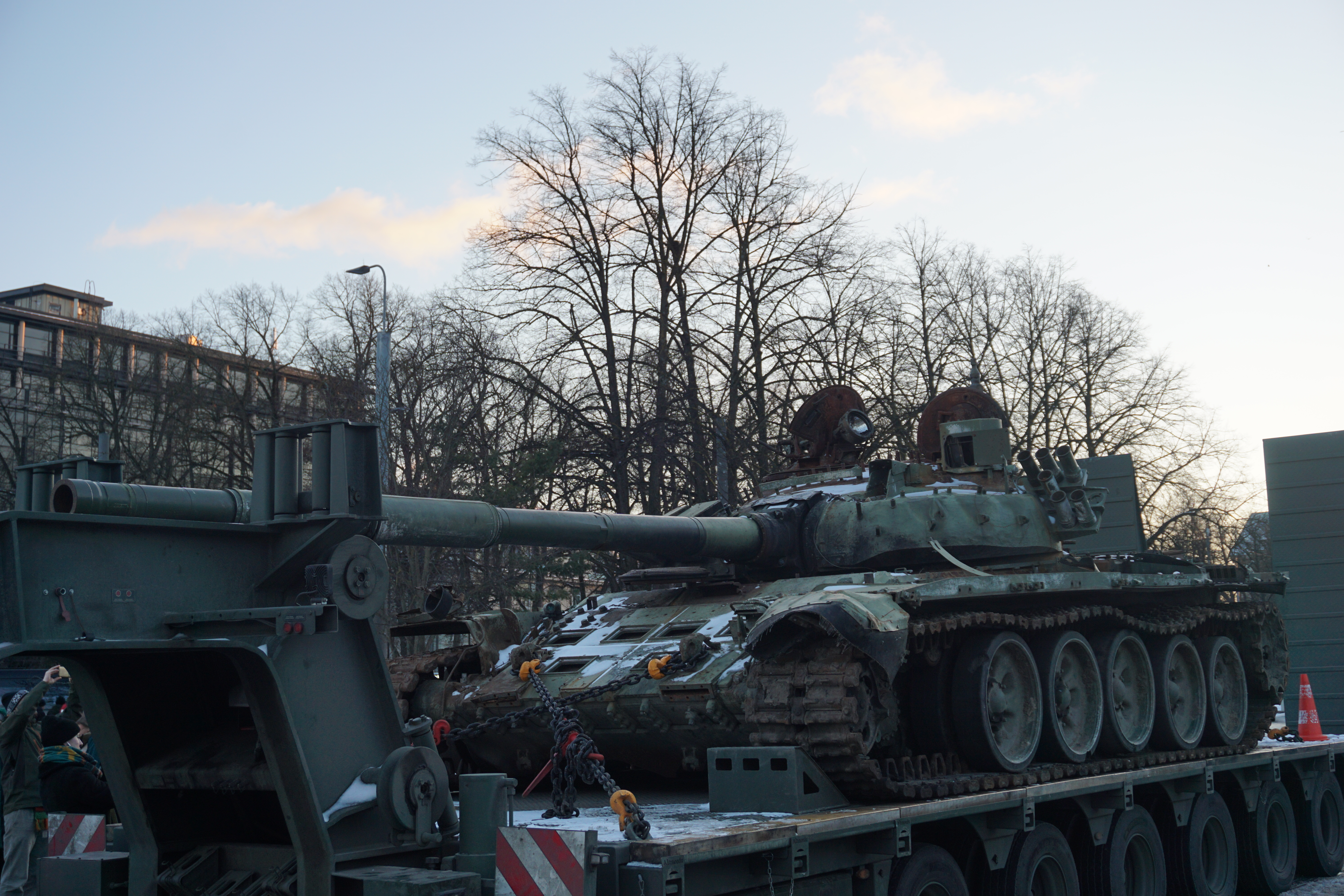
A damaged Russian T-72 tank was transported to Tallinn from Kyiv in late February 2023. The tank was put on display in Freedom Square, Tallinn

After the 2022 Russian invasion of Ukraine started, Estonia, as one of the EU countries, imposed sanctions on Russia, and Russia added all EU countries to the list of "unfriendly nations". Estonia joined other countries in spring 2022 in declaring a number of Russian diplomats Persona non grata. Estonia also introduced a ban on Russian language media channels.

In September 2022, Poland, Lithuania, Latvia, and Estonia decided to close entry for Russian citizens with Schengen visas, including those issued by third countries.

On 18 October 2022, the Estonian parliament voted in favour of officially recognizing Russia as a terrorist state. The Riigikogu also called on the international community to adopt a similar position.

On 6 December 2022, Vadim Konoshchenok, a suspected FSB officer was arrested at the border with high tech electronic items and ammunition sourced in the US, additional goods were found in a warehouse Konoshchenok was renting. The USA sought his extradition, which was granted and actioned in July 2023.

In January 2023, Estonian Foreign Ministry spokesman Mihkel Tamm announced Estonia's intention to seize $21.4 million in Russian assets in Estonia and deliver it to Ukraine. Estonia is working with European Commission on plans to seize Russian assets frozen in the European Union which are estimated to be in the hundreds of billions of dollars.

Estonia announced the expulsion of 21 Russian diplomats and technical staff in January 2023 and encouraged other European Union countries to follow suit. In response, Russia responded by downgrading its relations with Estonia and expelling the Estonian ambassador Margus Laidre; Estonia responded in kind.

Prime Minister Kaja Kallas called Russia a "threat to the whole of Europe". Riigikogu, the parliament of Estonia, also passed two statements on the mobilization of Russia's pre-invasion forces and the start of the attack against Ukraine in 2022, in which it expressed support for the territorial integrity of Ukraine and condemned the war started by the Russian Federation.

Estonia voted in favor of United Nations General Assembly Resolution ES-11/1. The resolution deplored Russia's invasion of Ukraine and demanded a full withdrawal of Russian forces and a reversal of its decision to recognise the self-declared People's Republics of Donetsk and Luhansk.

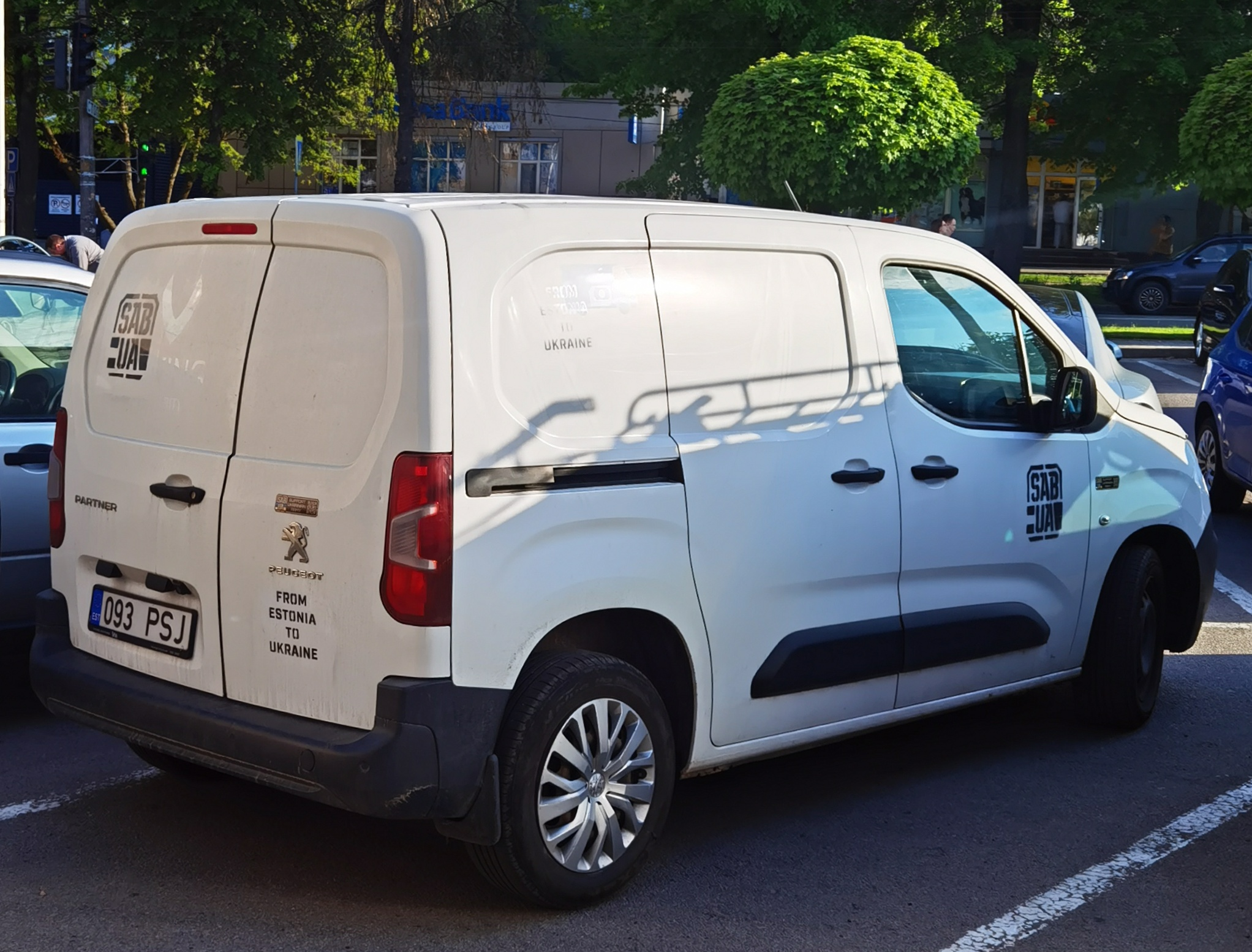
Car with sign "From Estonia to Ukraine" in Dnipro, Ukraine, during war.

As of May 2023, 130,000 Ukrainians entered Estonia as a result of the invasion of Ukraine in 2022, with 71,000 currently living in Estonia. Around 200-300 Ukrainians apply for asylum in Estonia per week.

Estonia has sent the most aid to Ukraine per capita, around 0.8% of Estonia's GDP in 2 months, and 1.5% of its GDP as of 14 December 2023.

On 11 January 2024, Volodymyr Zelenskyy visited Tallinn, Estonia, after he began a tour of the Baltic States. Zelenskyy met with Estonian political leaders and addressed the Estonian parliament with a speech expressing gratitude for the Estonian government's and people's support and aid for Ukraine. After Zelenskyy's visit, the President of Estonia, Alar Karis pledged to allocate 1.2 billion euros ($1.3 billion) worth of aid for Ukraine until 2027.

== Resident diplomatic missions ==
- Estonia has an embassy in Kyiv.
- Ukraine has an embassy in Tallinn.
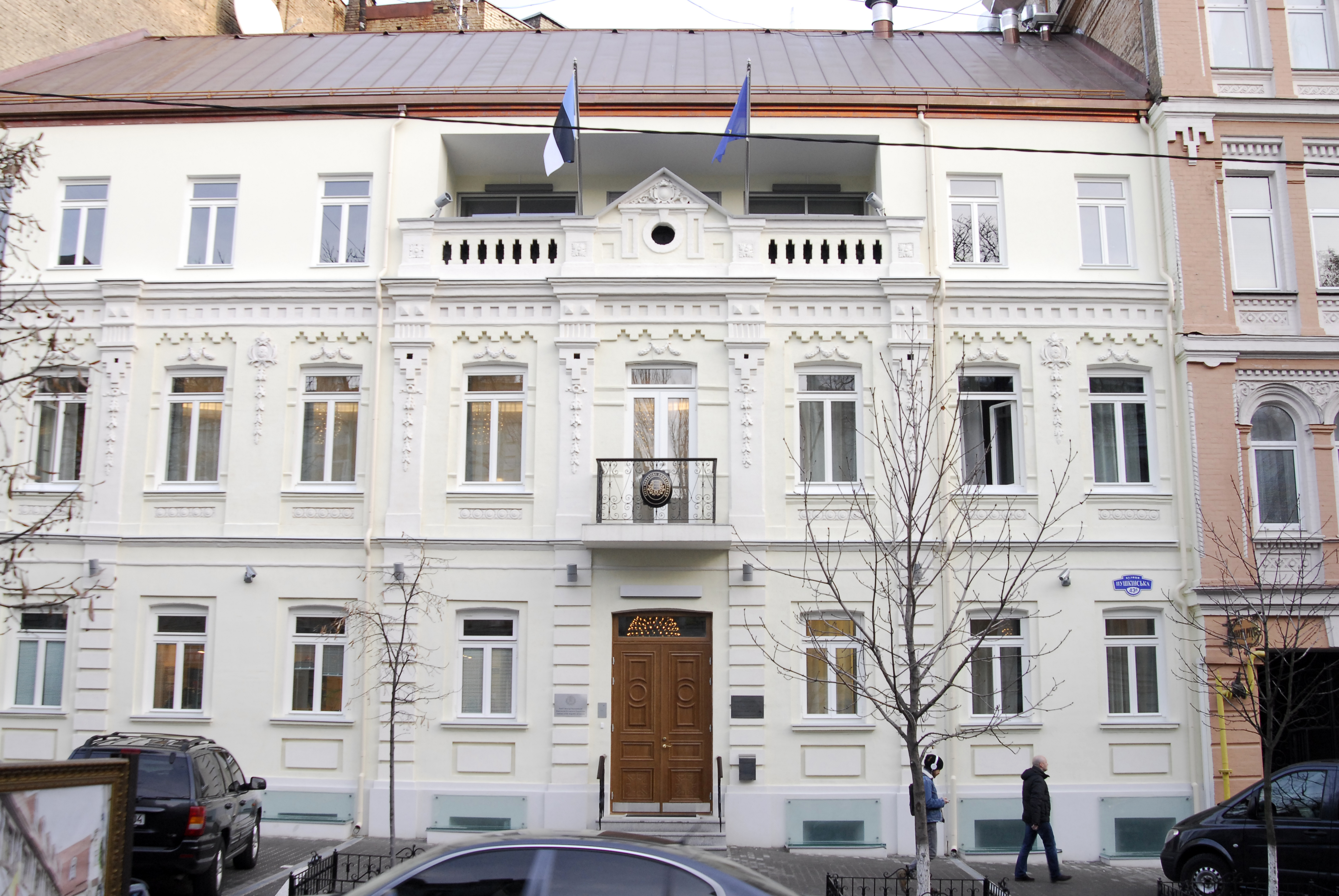
Embassy of Estonia in Kyiv

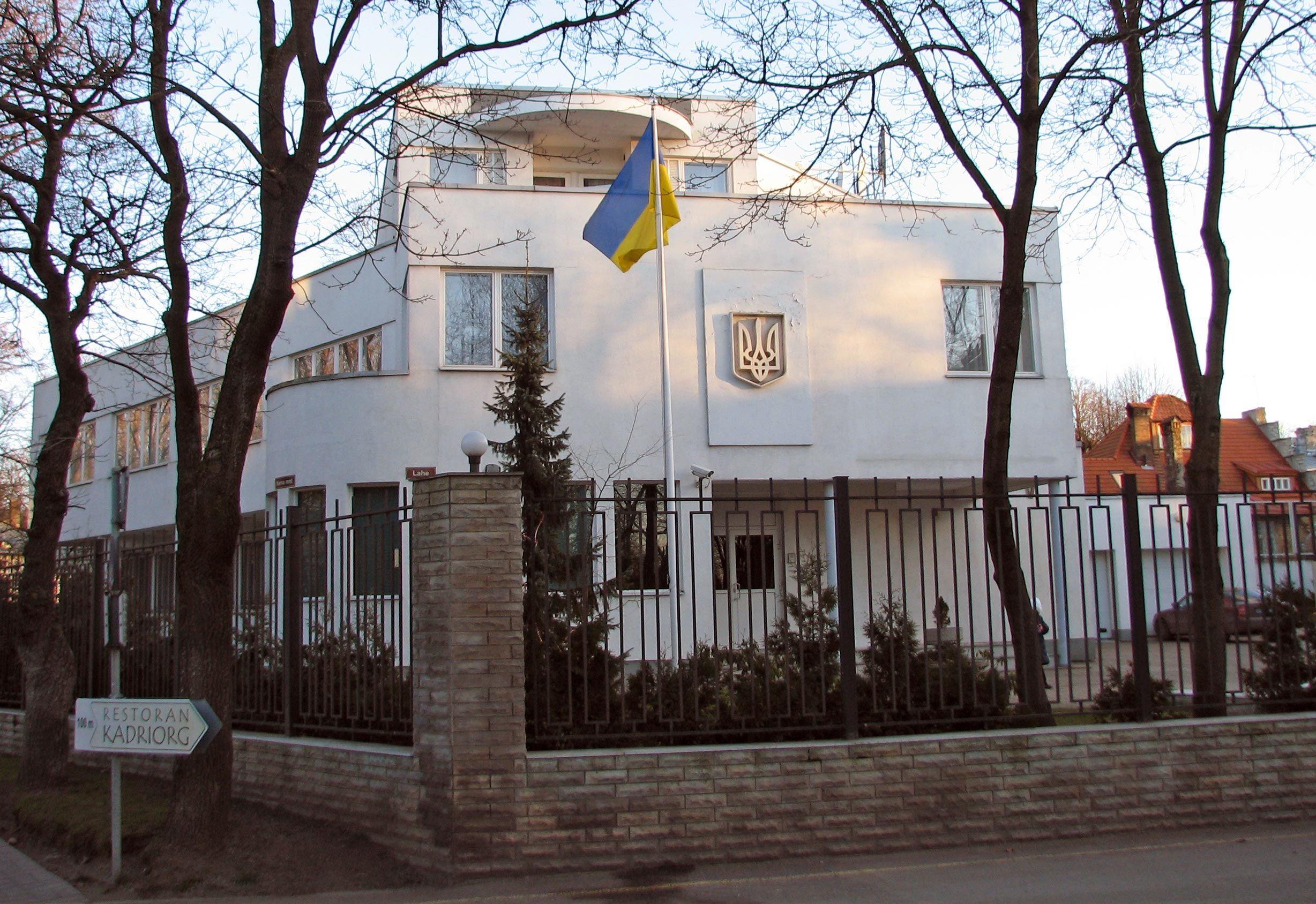
Embassy of Ukraine in Tallinn

== See also ==
- Foreign relations of Estonia
- Foreign relations of Ukraine
- Estonians in Ukraine
- Ukrainians in Estonia
- Ukraine–EU relations
  - Accession of Ukraine to the EU
- Ukraine–NATO relations
