= Fuat Oktay =

Vice President of Turkey from 2018 to 2023

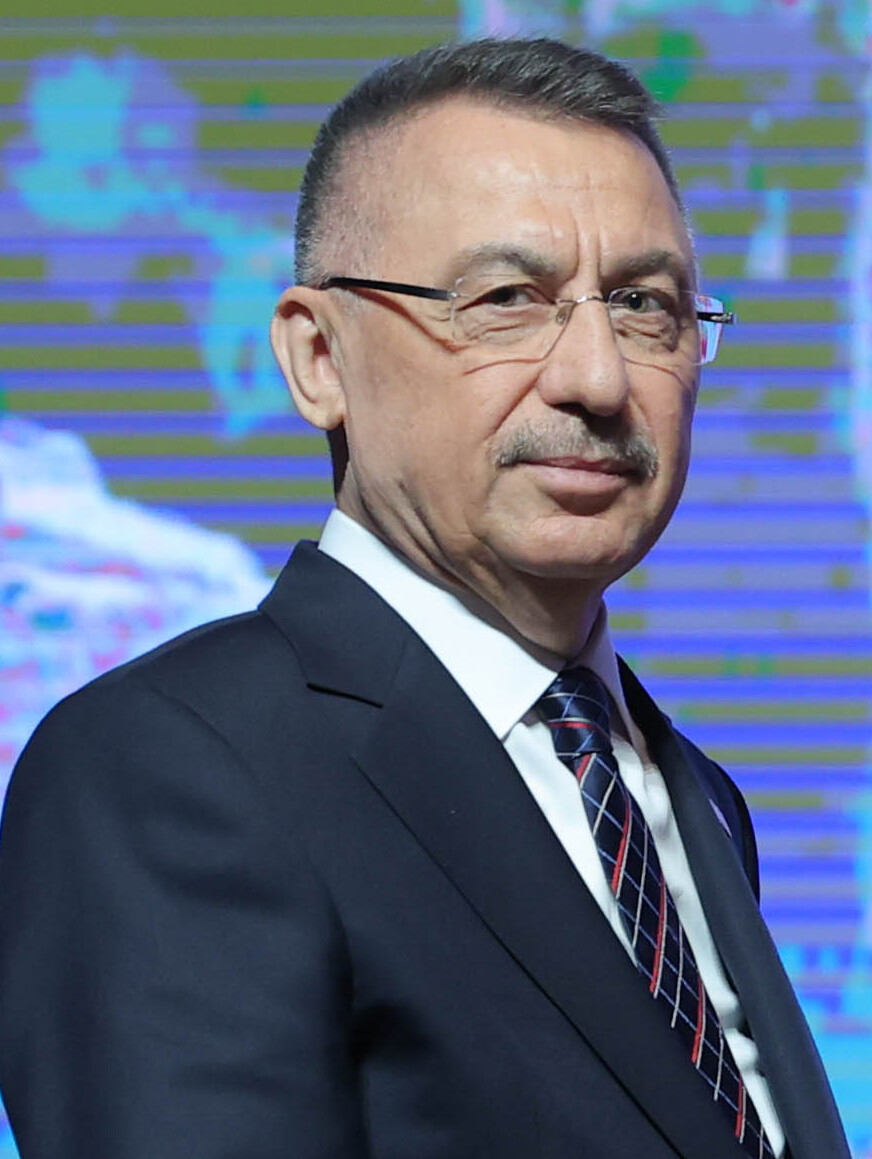
- Oktay in 2023

1st Vice President of Turkey
- In office 10 July 2018 – 4 June 2023
- President: Recep Tayyip Erdoğan
- Preceded by: Office established
- Succeeded by: Cevdet Yılmaz

Member of the Grand National Assembly
- Incumbent
- Assumed office 2 June 2023
- Constituency: Ankara (III) (2023)

Undersecretary to the Prime Minister of Turkey
- In office 18 June 2016 – 9 July 2018
- Prime Minister: Binali Yıldırım
- Preceded by: Kemal Madenoğlu
- Succeeded by: Office abolished

Director of the Disaster and Emergency Management Presidency
- In office 2 January 2012 – 18 June 2016
- Prime Minister: Recep Tayyip Erdoğan; Ahmet Davutoğlu; Binali Yıldırım
- Preceded by: İbrahim Ejder Kaya (acting)
- Succeeded by: Mehmet Halis Bilden

Personal details
- Born: 21 January 1964 (age 62) Çekerek, Yozgat, Turkey
- Party: Justice and Development Party
- Spouse(s): Bedriye Şahinbaş (div. 2011) Hümeyra Şahin (m. 2022)
- Children: 3
- Education: Çukurova University; Wayne State University

Fuat Oktay (born 21 January 1964) is a Turkish politician, civil servant and academic who served as the first vice president of Turkey from 2018 to 2023. He previously served as undersecretary to the prime minister of Turkey from 2016 until his appointment to the vice presidency, following the creation of the office after the 2017 constitutional referendum.

== Early life and career ==
=== Education ===
Fuat Oktay was born on 21 January 1964 in Çekerek, Yozgat, and studied management at Çukurova University. Graduating in 1985, he began working at the university as a research assistant. In 1990, he obtained a master's degree from Wayne State University in Detroit in business and manufacturing engineering, as well as a doctorate in industrial engineering. While in the United States, he specialised in the fields of automotive engineering and communication.

=== Academic and consultancy career ===
Throughout the 2001 economic crisis, Oktay was involved in crisis management roles while also serving as the head of the Management Department and deputy dean at Beykent University. Alongside his academic career, Oktay also served as a consultant and advisor for both state-owned and private businesses, serving in the capacities of general manager, vice president and executive board member for many of them.

=== Private sector ===
From 13 May 2001 to 1 October 2003, Oktay remained in the management of Yimpas Necessity for a year and a half.

Oktay served as deputy general manager responsible for strategic planning and business development, production planning and information technology as well as sales and marketing at Turkish Airlines between 2008 and 2012. Being responsible for many development projects under the Turkish Airlines brand, he also served as an executive board member of the Foreign Economic Relations Board (DEİK) and the Turkish–English, Turkish–German and Turkish–Spanish business councils.

Oktay also served as an executive board member of Turkish Aerospace Industries (TAI), of Turkish Technic and as the vice president of Türk Telekom.

== Civil service ==
Between 2012 and 2016, Oktay served as the head of the Disaster and Emergency Management Presidency (AFAD). During his tenure, he formulated several agreements in the field of risk and crisis management with other countries on behalf of the Turkish government.

=== Undersecretary to the prime minister ===
Following the appointment of Binali Yıldırım as prime minister of Turkey, Oktay was appointed as his undersecretary on 18 June 2016. He became known for his modernisation of bureaucratic institutions with new digital and technological advances.

He was part of the main diplomatic resistance during the Turkish coup d'état attempt on 15 July 2016. During the Operation Euphrates Shield and the Operation Olive Branch, which were carried out by Turkey, Oktay served in the capacity as co-ordinator between different bureaucratic institutions that were involved.

== Vice presidency (2018–2023) ==
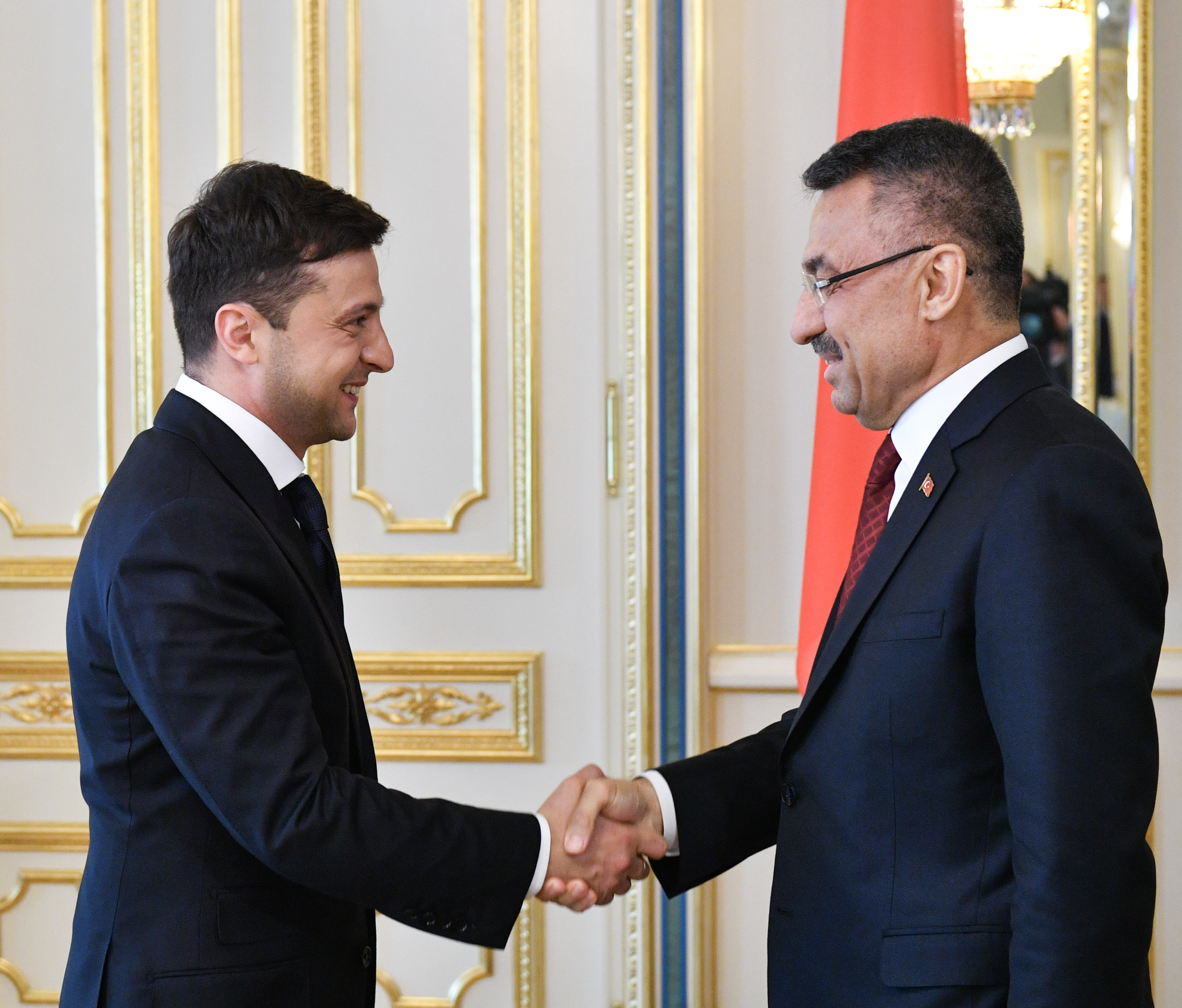
Oktay greeting Volodymyr Zelenskyy, May 2019.

In the 2017 constitutional referendum, voters narrowly approved constitutional changes that dissolved the existing parliamentary system in place of an executive presidency amid allegations of electoral fraud. The new system of government would see the president of Turkey becoming both head of state and head of government, abolishing the former head of government post of prime minister. The new system instigated the creation of the office of vice president of Turkey, who would be appointed and serve at the pleasure of the president.

=== Appointment ===
Early general elections took place on 24 June 2018 to elect the president and 600 members of parliament to the Grand National Assembly. The Justice and Development Party (AKP) candidate Recep Tayyip Erdoğan won the presidency with 52.59% of the vote outright, nullifying the need for a second round. His party also won the most seats in Parliament, falling short of a majority with 295 members of parliament.

With the election of Erdoğan as the first president to take office under the new executive presidential system, it was speculated that he would adopt a predominantly technocratic cabinet and seek a 'United States' model by appointing just one vice president, despite the constitutional changes allowing multiple vice presidents to serve at once. Oktay was unveiled as Turkey's first vice president on 9 July 2018 with the announcement of the new cabinet, and was sworn in to office the next day.

=== Parliamentary candidacy ===
In March 2023, President Erdoğan announced that the AKP will nominate Fuat Oktay to become a member of parliament in the upcoming elections.

== See also ==
- Vice President of Turkey
- President of Turkey

Political offices
Office established	Vice President of Turkey; 2018–2023	Succeeded by Cevdet Yılmaz
