= EAE Business School =

Spanish private business school

Coordinates: 41°22′49″N 2°08′56″E

- EAE Business School
- Type: private business school
- Established: 1958
- President: Dr. D. José Luis Fernández
- Dean: Dr. D. Enric Ordeix
- Location: C/ Aragó 55 - 08015 - Barcelona; C/ del Príncipe de Vergara, 156 - 28036 - Madrid, Barcelona, Madrid, Spain
- Campus: Urban
- Website: www.eae.es

The EAE Business School is a private business school founded in 1958 with campuses in Madrid and Barcelona (Spain).

== History ==
The EAE Business School was founded in 1958 by José de Orbaneja y Aragón. In 2006, Grupo Planeta bought EAE Business School. EAE has one campus in Barcelona and one in Madrid.

== Accreditations ==
EAE offers third-party accreditations by the Universitat Politècnica de Catalunya for programs in Barcelona, and by the Universidad UNIE for programs in Madrid.

== Affiliations ==
- Member of AEEDE (Spanish Association of Business Management Schools)
- EFMD (European Foundation for Management Development)
- EBEN (European Business Ethics Network)
- ForQ (Association for Quality in Training)
- CLADEA (Latin American Council of MBA Schools)
- Member of AACSB (The Association to Advance Collegiate Schools of Business), but not accredited
