= Rome Business School =

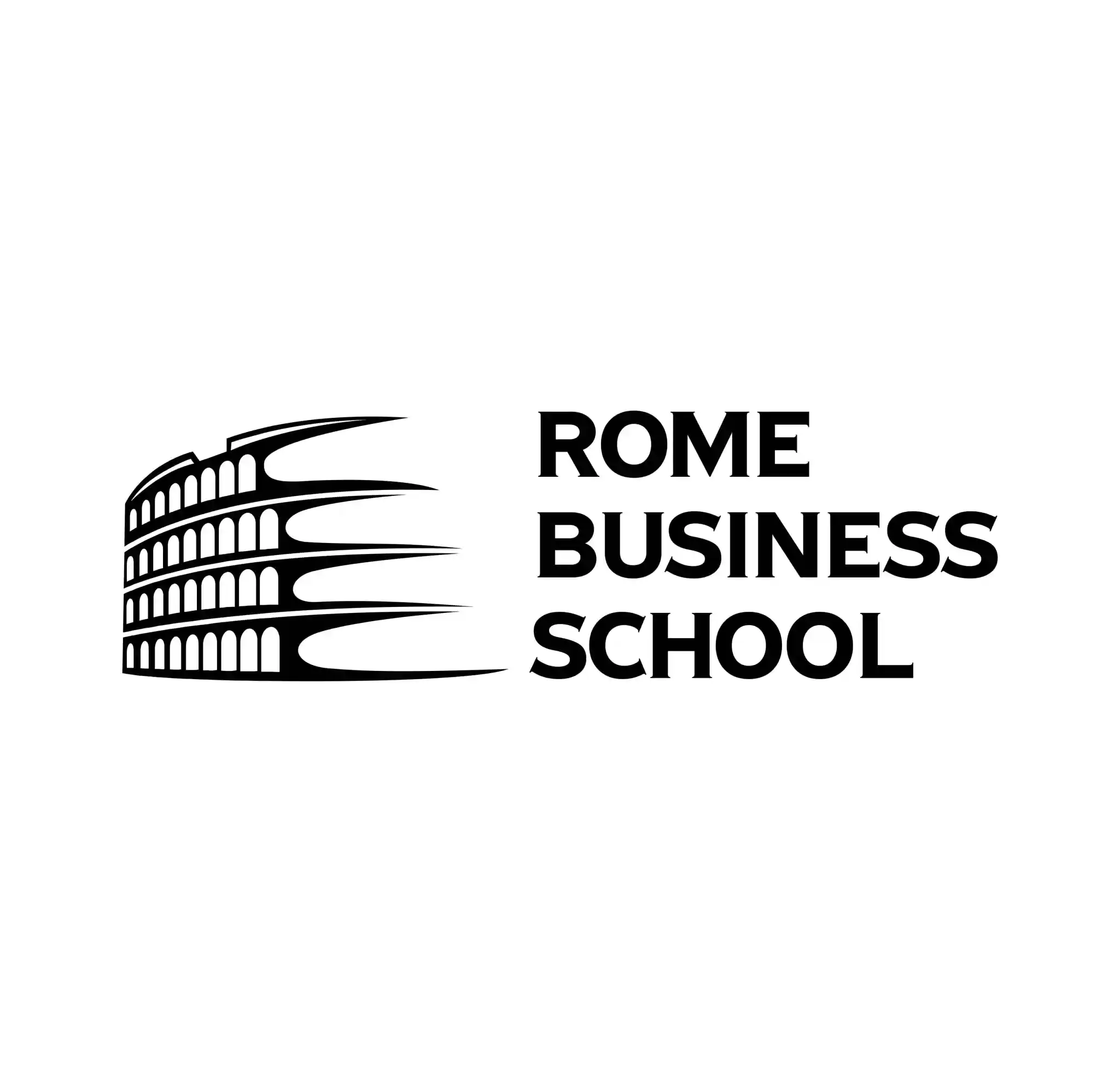
- Rome Business School logo

Location
- Via Giuseppe Montanelli, 5 Rome; Italy

Information
- Type: Business School
- Motto: Better Managers For a Better World
- Established: 2011
- Dean: Antonio Ragusa
- Language: English
- Website: https://romebusinessschool.com/

Rome Business School is a business school based in Rome, Italy, active in the field of management education and postgraduate training. The institution offers master's degrees, MBA programs, and executive education courses delivered on campus, online and in blended formats.

According to data published by the institution, its student body includes participants from more than 160 countries.

== History ==
Rome Business School is a management education institution based in Rome, offering postgraduate education, MBA programmes, and executive education. Over time, it has expanded its academic offering to include both on-campus and online programmes and has developed partnerships with international academic institutions, including EAE Business School.

Since 2019, it has been part of Planeta Formación y Universidades, Grupo Planeta’s higher education division, with the participation of De Agostini. The group comprises institutions operating in several countries and is active in university, professional, and management education.

== Accreditation & Membership ==
Rome Business School reports institutional recognition, quality certification, programme accreditations and memberships with professional and educational organisations.

=== Certifications and programme accreditations ===
- ISO 9001:2015: quality management certification for training and educational activities.
- ASFOR – Italian Association for Management Education: accreditation for selected programmes.
- EFMD EOCCS – Online Course Certification System: certification for selected online courses.
- DASCA – Data Science Council of America: accreditation for the International Master in Data Science.
- SHRM – Society for Human Resource Management: academic alignment for Human Resources programmes.

=== Memberships ===
- EFMD – European Foundation for Management Development
- ASFOR – Italian Association for Management Education
- EADL – European Association for Distance Learning
- ECBE – European Council for Business Education
- PRME – Principles for Responsible Management Education
- PWA – Professional Women's Association
- PMI – Project Management Institute

== Rankings ==
Rome Business School has appeared in international rankings and rating systems for business schools and higher education institutions. These include institutional ratings and rankings published by QS, Times Higher Education and the Positive Impact Rating, as well as programme-specific rankings published by QS, CEO Magazine and Eduniversal.

=== International rankings and rating ===
- Bloomberg Businessweek Best B-Schools 2026–2027: Rome Business School entered the ranking for the first time with its International MBA, placing 18th in Europe and the Middle East.
- QS Business Master’s & MBA Rankings 2027: six Rome Business School programmes were included in the 2027 rankings, with all six placing among Europe’s Top 100 and four among Italy’s Top 5; three programmes also achieved top results for Return on Investment.
- QS International Trade Rankings 2027: Rome Business School’s Global MBA ranked among the Top 40 worldwide, placing 38th out of 110 programmes. The programme ranked #1 worldwide for Graduate Outcomes for the second consecutive year, #9 worldwide for Innovative Teaching and #14 worldwide for Trade Programme Content.
- QS Stars Rating: Rome Business School received an overall rating of 4 stars.
- Times Higher Education World University Rankings: Rome Business School was included in Times Higher Education rankings and institutional profiles.
- Times Higher Education Impact Rankings: Rome Business School was included in the Impact Rankings for its contribution to the United Nations Sustainable Development Goals.
- Times Higher Education Interdisciplinary Science Rankings: Rome Business School was included in the ranking for its interdisciplinary research activity.
- In the Times Higher Education World University Rankings 2027, Rome Business School was included for the third consecutive year with “Reporter” status. The 2027 edition evaluated 2,297 institutions across 118 countries and territories.
- HE Higher Education Ranking 2025: Rome Business School ranked 23rd worldwide, 6th in Europe and 1st in Italy.
- Positive Impact Rating: Rome Business School achieved Level 4, “Transforming Business School”.
- Eduniversal Best Business School Ranking 2025: Rome Business School entered the Palmes of Excellence.

=== Programme rankings ===
In addition to institutional rankings and ratings, several Rome Business School MBA and Master's programmes have been included in programme-specific international rankings.

- MBA programmes: the School's International Online MBA, Executive MBA, International MBA and Global MBA have been ranked by QS and CEO Magazine in global, European and Italian MBA classifications, with the International MBA also ranked by Bloomberg Businessweek.
- Global MBA – QS International Trade Rankings 2027: ranked 38th worldwide and among the global Top 40, with #1 worldwide for Graduate Outcomes for the second consecutive year, #9 worldwide for Innovative Teaching and #14 worldwide for Trade Programme Content.
- QS-ranked Master's programmes: International Master in Finance, International Master in Supply Chain Management and Logistics, Global Master in Marketing and Growth Hacking, International Master in Data Science and Global Master in International Management.
- Eduniversal-ranked Master's programmes: International Master in Data Science, Global Master in International Management, International Master in Agribusiness Management, International Master in Arts and Culture Management, International Master in Fashion Management, International Master in Food and Beverage Management, International Master in E-Health Management, International Master in Tourism and Hospitality Management, Global Master in Human Resources and Talent Development, Global Master in Fashion and Luxury Management, and International Master in Sport Management.

== International Partnerships ==
Rome Business School maintains an international network of academic partners in Europe, the Americas, Africa and Asia. According to the school, its academic partners include universities, business schools and higher education institutions involved in international projects, academic cooperation and student mobility.

The school lists partners such as International University of Valencia, EAE Business School, Teesside University, Pace University, Babson College, Dublin Business School, Porto Business School, Jindal Global Business School, Chancellor Institute, Zhejiang Financial College.

Rome Business School also offers international mobility activities, including semester abroad opportunities, global business programmes and bootcamps.

== Programmes ==
Rome Business School offers Master's, MBA, Executive, and Bachelor's programs, available either on campus or online through live lectures.

=== MBA Programmes ===
- International MBA
- International MBA - Online
- Executive MBA

=== International Master's programmes ===
- International Master in Marketing and Sales
- International Master in HR and Organization
- International Master in Arts and Culture Management
- International Master in Fashion Management
- International Master in Agribusiness Management
- International Master in Tourism and Hospitality Management
- International Master in Sport Business Management
- International Master in Project Management
- International Master in Data Science
- International Master in Artificial Intelligence
- International Master in Entrepreneurship and Innovation
- International Master in Ethics, Diversity and Inclusion
- International Master in Finance
- International Master in Banking and Risk Management
- International Master in Pharma and Health Management
- International Master in Food and Beverage Management
- International Master in Supply Chain Management and Logistics
- International Master in Sustainability and Circular Bioeconomy
- International Master in International Business and Corporate Law
- International Master in Brand Management and Communication
- International Master in Energy Management
- International Master in Fintech

=== Executive Master's programmes ===
- Executive Master in Marketing and Sales
- Executive Master in Human Resources Management
- Executive Master in Digital Marketing
- Executive Master in Project Management
- Executive Master in Data Science
- Executive Master in Finaance and Financial Markets
- Executive Master in Gestione dell’Arte e dei Beni Culturali
- Executive Master in Fashion and Luxury Management
- Executive Master in Supply Chain Management e Logistics
- Executive Master in Gestione dello Sport
- Executive Master in Pharma and Health Management
- Executive Master in Artificial Intelligence

=== Global Master's programmes ===
- Global Master in Marketing and Growth Hacking
- Global Master in Fashion and Luxury Management
- Global Master in International Management (MIM)

=== Bachelor's programmes ===
- Bachelor's degree in Business Economics
- Bachelor's degree in Accounting and Finance
- Bachelor's degree in Business and Marketing

== Student Life and Services ==
Rome Business School provides student services for international and on-campus students, particularly those relocating to Italy. According to the school, these services are intended to support students before their arrival in Rome and during their studies.

The services include accommodation support, visa documentation support, Italian language courses and cultural activities.

== Career Service ==
Rome Business School has a Career Center that provides career-related services for students and alumni. According to the school, the Career Center carries out activities connected with career guidance, employability, entrepreneurship and relations with companies and recruiting partners. Its services include career orientation, preparation for recruitment processes, mentoring activities, access to a job portal, and initiatives related to professional skills development.

The Career Center is also involved in the organisation of networking and recruiting activities, such as career fairs, company presentations, workshops and meetings with recruiters and industry representatives.

Other activities concern entrepreneurship and independent employment, with initiatives addressed to students and alumni interested in freelance, consulting or self-employment career paths, as well as in the creation or development of business projects.
