= Jaanika Merilo =

Estonian-Ukrainian digital reformer

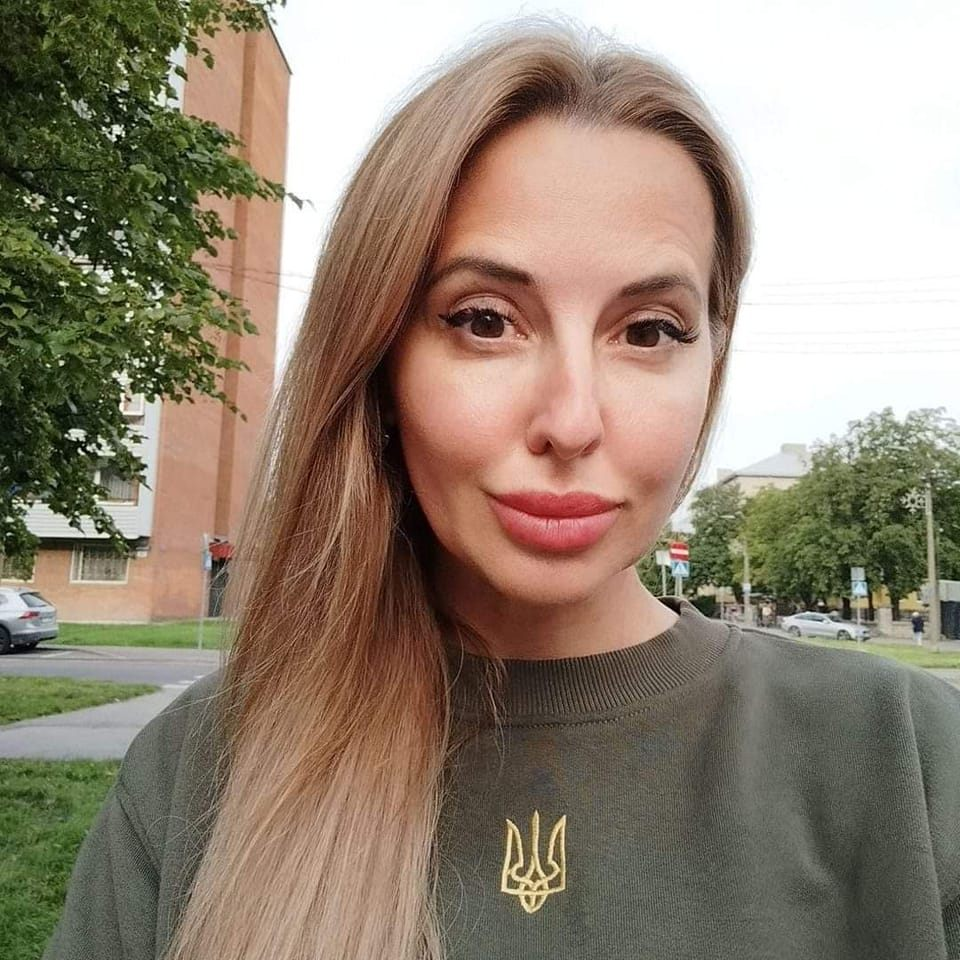
- Jaanika Merilo
- Born: Jaanika Mihhalevitš; 16 November 1979 (age 46); Tartu, then part of Estonian SSR, Soviet Union
- Citizenship: Estonia
- Education: Estonian Business School; University of Cumbria (2015); Rome Business School (2022)
- Occupation: Head of eHealth of Estonia

Jaanika Boryslavivna Merilo (Ukrainian: Яніка Борисла́вівна Мери́ло) is an Estonian-Ukrainian reformer, IT innovator, and philanthropist.

Since October 2019, Merilo has been an advisor to Deputy Prime Minister of Ukraine and Minister of Digital Transformation Mykhaylo Fedorov. She served as advisor to two Ministers of Infrastructure of Ukraine, the mayor of Dnipro, and the mayor of Lviv. She has served as expert advisor in Ukrainian State Agency of E-Government, and is the founder of charity programmes BookAngel and SoundAngel, and a co-founder of NGO Herojam Slava.

Since March 2023 Merilo has been Special Advisor (in innovation and international co-operation) to the Ministry of Social Affairs of Estonia and since 2024 Head of eHealth strategy of Estonia, while continuing as advisor to the Minister of Digital Transformation of Ukraine.

== Early life ==
Jaanika Merilo was born Jaanika Mihhalevitš on 16 November 1979, in Tartu, Estonian SSR, to Ukrainian father, artist Boryslav Mikhalevich (Estonian: Borislav Mihhalevitš) from Kamianets-Podilskyi and Estonian mother Heinike Heinsoo, a professor of Baltic-Finnic Languages at the University of Tartu. Merilo studied in the Estonian Business School (EBS), and in 2015 completed the MBA programme of the University of Cumbria. She also obtained masters degrees in E-health Management (cum laude) from Rome Business School and from the University of Valencia in 2022. In 2023, Merilo started studies in Global Security in King's College London.

Merilo started her career as a programmer for Olivetti and founded her own IT company, whose clients were Finnish business magazine Arvopaperi, Finnish Nokia and multinational Microsoft. In 2000 she started as Chief Innovation Officer and developing markets analyst of Arvopaperi. Merilo has still afterwards worked as a writer and columnist for Arvopaperi. In 2004 Merilo started as an invest manager at Martinson Trigon Venture Partners and was founding Estonian Investor Association and Estonian Development Fund. From 2008 to 2012 she managed the direct investments of Estonian entrepreneur Urmas Sõõrumaa mainly in Russia and Ukraine.

== Career ==
From January 5, 2015 to April 2015, she was an advisor to Minister of Economics and Trade Aivaras Abromavicius. Since June 15, 2015 to May 2020 she served as an advisor to Mayor of Lviv. From May 12, 2016, to May 2019 served as an advisor to Minister of Infrastructure and Transportation Volodymyr Omelyan and since October 2019 to following Minister Vladyslav Kryklii. From October 2016 to April 2019, she served as Active Deputy Mayor to Mayor of Dnipro Borys Filatov.

In May, she became advisor to Head of Ukrainian Customs Authority Maksym Nefyodov and in July 2019, coordinator of eHealth of the Office of the President of Ukraine Volodymyr Zelenskyy. Since October 2019 advisor to Deputy Prime Minister and Minister of Digital Transformation Mykhailo Fedorov.

Since January 2022 - March 2023, she was Global Head of PR and Communications in global investment and trading marketplace Funderbeam.

Since March 2023, Jaanika is the Special Adviser of Ministry of Social Affairs of Estonia on innovation and international co-operation while continuing as advisor to Minister of Digital Transformation of Ukraine.

Since October 2024 Jaanika serves as the "Head of Digital Health and Care" in Ministry of Social Affairs of Estonia.

== Personal life ==
Jaanika Merilo is married and the mother of a son. A bilingual native Estonian and Ukrainian-speaker, Merilo is also proficient in Russian and English, and speaks in Finnish, French and Spanish as well. Merilo has published a biographical book "I'm from Jaanika" about the reforms in Ukraine, and a collection of poems "Out of Rhythm" (2008). In 2021, she published a book Minu Ukraina ("My Ukraine") as part of a popular Estonian-language travel book series by Petrone Print.

== Awards ==
- 2015 - nominated In Top 12 most outstanding Estonian woman in the world" by Estonian Word.
- 2015 - nominated by Google and Financial Times in NE 100 as "one of the innovators that change the world".
- 2015, 2016, 2017 and 2018 in TOP 100 "Most Influential Woman" by Focus magazine (2015 — 66, 2016 — 54, 2017 — 59 and 2018 — 57)
- 2017- Nominated in «50 Business Ladies» in «IT and telecom»
- 2016 and 2017 - Gold Prize in «Personal impact in development of startups and investment» by PaySpace Magazine Awards
- 2016 - Reformer of the Week by Kyiv Post
- 2016 - Nominated by Forbes "example of best lobbyist of modern times"
- 2019 - Top 50 "Most Influential Business Ladies" by Correspondent magazine.
- 2019 - Top 25 "Fintech Managers of Independent Ukraine"
- 2020 - Top 50 "Most Influential Woman in Ukraine" by Correspondent magazine.
- 2021 - Top 50 Most Influential Woman in Ukraine" by Correspondent magazine.
- 2021 - Top 50 "Most influential Woman in fintech" by USAID and EFSE Development Facility
- 2023 - "Best known people from Baltics in Ukraine" by Forbes Baltics,
- 2023 - Awarded by Minister of Defence of Estonia with letter of gratitude in annual award ceremony.
