= List of countries by ethnic groups =

The following article lists sovereign states, dependent territories and some quasi-states according to their proportional ethnic population composition. Ethnic classifications vary from country to country and are therefore not comparable across countries. While some countries make classifications based on broad ancestry groups or characteristics such as skin color (e.g., the white ethnic category in the United States and some other countries), other countries use various ethnic, cultural, linguistic, or religious factors for classification. Ethnic groups may be subdivided into subgroups, which may or may not be identified as independent ethnic groups in their own right, depending on the source.

A number of countries also do not collect any estimates on the ethnic composition of their population (like France) and the ethnic composition of the population is of high political sensitivity in many countries, which is why reliable data are not available for many countries. Therefore, in some cases, indicators such as citizenship/nationality, ancestry or origin, country of birth, or language are used as alternative indicators. The data in the list are also of variable quality and timeliness, as only irregularly updated estimates are available for many countries. Most of the entries in the list come from the Central Intelligence Agency's World Factbook database or from national statistical offices.

== Ethnic groups by country ==
Countries and territories are sorted alphabetically. Dependent territories and quasi-states that are not universally recognized sovereign states are written in italics in the list.

Country or territory	Estimation or Census Data	Detailed
Abkhazia	By ethnicity Abkhazians (50.7%), Georgians (19.2%), Armenians (17.4%), Russians (9.1%), Greeks (0.6%), other (3.0%) (2011 Census)	
Afghanistan	By ethnicity Pashtuns (42%), Tajiks (27%), Hazaras (9%), Uzbeks (9%), Aimaks (4%), Turkmen (3%), Balochs (2%), other (4%, including Pamiris, Arabs, Nuristanis and others) (2013 estimate)	
Albania	By ethnicity Albanians (82.6%), Greeks (0.9%), other 1% (including Aromanians, Romani, Macedonians, Montenegrins, and Balkan Egyptians), unspecified (15.5%) (2011 estimate)	
Algeria	By ethnicity Arabs and Berbers (99%, including pure Berbers approx. 15%), Europeans under 1% (estimate)	Arabs, Berbers, Turks, French
American Samoa	By ethnicity Pacific Islanders (88.7%, includes Samoans 83.2%, Tongans 2.2%, other 3.3%), Asians (5.8%, includes Filipinos 3.4%, other 2.4%), mixed (4.4%), other 1.1% (2020 estimate)	
Andorra	By nationality Andorrans (48.3%), Spaniards (24.8%), Portuguese (11.2%), French (4.5%), Argentines (1.4%), other (9.8%) (2021 estimate)	
Angola	By ethnicity Ovimbundu (37%), Kimbundu (25%), Bakongo (13%), Mestico (2%, mixed European and African descent), Whites (1%), other (22%) (estimate)	
Anguilla	By ethnicity Blacks (85.3%), Hispanics (4.9%), mixed (3.8%), Whites (3.2%), Indians (1%), other (1.6%), unspecified (0 .3%) (2011 estimate)	
Antigua and Barbuda	By ethnicity Blacks (87.3%), mixed (4.7%), Hispanics (2.7%), Whites (1.6%), other (2.7%), unspecified (0.9%) (2011 estimate)	
Argentina	By ethnicity Whites/Castizo (mostly Italian and Spanish; 85–88%), Mestizo (10%), Indigenous Argentines (2.8%), Afro-Argentines (0.6%), Asians (0.8%) and others (3%) (2022 estimate)	Spaniards, Sephards, Italians, Paraguayans, Chileans, Ukrainians, Croats, Volga Germans, Armenians, Russians, Irish, Boers, Syrians, Lebanese, Mapuche, Cape Verdeans, French
Armenia	By ethnicity Armenians (98.1%), Yazidis (1.2%), other (0.7% including Russians, Kurds, Assyrians and others) (2011 census)	
Aruba	By nationality Dutch (78.7%), Colombians (6.6%), Venezuelans (5.5%), Dominicans (2.8%), Haitians (1.3%), other (5.1%) (2020 estimate)	
Azerbaijan	By ethnicity Azerbaijanis (91.6%), Lezgins (2.0%), Russians (1.3%), Armenians (1.3%), Talysh (1.3%), Avars (0.5%), other (1.9%) (2009 census)	
Australia	By most common ancestry English (33%), Australian (29.9%, descent from early settlers), Irish (9.5%), Scots (8.6%), Chinese (5.5%), Italian (4.4%), German (4.0%), Indian (3.1%), Aboriginal Australians (2.9%), Greek (1.7%), unspecified (4.7%) (2021 census)	English, Irish, Scottish, Chinese, Indian, Lebanese, Croats, Serbs, Turkish, Greeks, Germans, White South Africans, Zimbabweans, Ghanaians, White New Zealanders, Samoan, Malay, White Americans, Koreans, Russians, Kenyans, Somalis, Iraqis, Italians, Dutch
Austria	By migration status Austrians without a migration background (74%), Austrians with a migration background (7%), foreigners (19%) (2023 estimate) By citizenship Austrians (81.0%), Germans (2.5%), Romanians (1.6%), Serbs (1.3%), Turks (1.3%), Hungarians (1.1%), Bosnians (1.1%), Croats (1.1%), Syrians (0.9%), Poles (0.7%), Afghans (0.5%), Slovaks (0.5%), other (6.1%), unspecified (0.3%) (2023, estimate)	
Bahamas	By ethnicity Afro-Bahamians (90.6%), Whites (4.7%), mixed (2.1%), other (1.9%), unspecified (0.7%) (2010 estimate)	
Bahrain	By ethnicity Bahraini (46%), Asians (45.5%), other Arabs (4.7%), Africans (1.6%), Europeans (1%) (2010 estimate)	Bahrainian Arab, Persian, Indian, Pakistanis, Filipinos, Black Bahrainians, Europeans
Bangladesh	By ethnicity Bengalis (99%), ethnic minorities (1%, proportion of minorities may underestimated) (2022 census)	
Barbados	By ethnicity Afro-Barbadians (92.4%), mixed (3.1%), Whites (2.7%), Indian (1.3%), other (0.2%), unspecified (0.3%) (2010 estimate)	
Belarus	By ethnicity Belarusians (84.9%), Russians (7.5%), Poles (3.1%), Ukrainians (1.7%), other (2.8%) (2019 census)	
Belgium	By migration status Belgians without a migration background (65.5%), Belgians with a migration background (21.0%, of which from Europe 10.8%, from Africa 7.0%, from Asia and Oceania 1.7%, from another region or unspecified 1.5%), foreigners (13.4%, of whom from Europe 9.4%, from Africa 2.0%, from Asia and Oceania 1.3%, from another region or unspecified 0.8%) (2023 estimate) By language Flemish (60%), Walloon (40%), German (<1%) (2023 estimate)	Belgians (Wallons, Flemish), Moroccans, Algerians, French, Italian, British, Russian, Spaniards, Turkish, Congolese, Rwandan, Cameroonian, Iraqi, Afghan, Chinese, Haitians, Greeks, Germans
Belize	By ethnicity Mestizo (52.9%), Creole (25.9%), Maya (11.3%), Garifuna (6.1%), Indians (3.9%), Mennonites (3.6%), Whites (1.2%), Asians (1%), other (1.2%), unknown (0.3%) (2010 census)	
Benin	By ethnicity Fon (38.4%), Aja (15.1%), Yoruba (12.0%), Bariba (9.6%), Fula (8.6%), Ottamari (6.1%), Yoa-Lukpa (4.3%), Dendi (2.9%), other (0.9%), foreigners (1.9%) (2013 census)	
Bermuda	By ethnicity Blacks (52%), Whites (31%), mixed (9%), Asians (4%), other (4%) (2010 estimate)	
Bhutan	By ethnicity Ngalop (50%), Nepalese (35%), indigenous peoples and migrating tribes (15%) (estimate)	
Bolivia	By ethnicity Mestizo (68%), Native Bolivians (20% including Aymara and Quechua), Whites (5%), Cholo (2%), Afro-Bolivians (1%), other (1%), unspecified (3%) (2009 estimate)	
Bosnia and Herzegovina	By ethnicity Bosniaks (50.1%), Serbs (30.8%), Croats (15.4%), other (2.7% including Albanians, Romani, Montenegrins and others), unspecified (1%) (2013 census )	
Botswana	By ethnicity Tswana (79%), Kalanga (11%), San (3%), other (7% including Kgalagadi, Whites and others) (estimate)	
Brazil	By ethnicity Pardo/mixed (45.3%), Whites (43.5%), Afro-Brazilians (10.2%), Native Brazilians (0.6%), Asians (0.4%) (2022 census)	Black Brazilians, Pardo, Polish, Russians, Germans, Italians, Tupi, Portuguese Brazilians, Angolans, Lebanese, Japanese, Chinese, Haitians, Venezuelans
British Virgin Islands	By ethnicity Blacks (76.3%), Hispanics (5.5%), Whites (5.4%), mixed (5.3%), Indians (3.7%), other (3.0%), unspecified (0.8%) (2010 estimate)	
Brunei	By ethnicity Malays (67.4%), Chinese (9.6%), other (23%) (2021 census)	
Bulgaria	By ethnicity Bulgarians (84.6%), Turks (8.4%), Romani (4.4%, according to other estimates 9–11%), Russians (0.2%), Armenians (0.1%), other (1.0%), unspecified (1.3%) (2021 census, proportions refer to people who declared their ethnicity)	
Burkina Faso	By ethnicity Mossi (52%), Fula (8.4%), Gurma (7%), Bobo (4.9%), Gurunsi (4.6%), Senufo (4.5%), Bissa (3.7%) ), Lobi (2.4%), Dagaare (2.4%), Tuareg/Bellah (1.9%), Dioula (0.8%), unspecified/no answer (0.3%), other (7.2%) (2010 estimate)	
Burundi	By ethnicity Hutu (Bantu) (approx. 85%), Tutsi (approx. 14%) Twa (approx. 1%), Phuthi, South Asians	
Cambodia	By ethnicity Khmer (95.4%), Chams (2.4%), Chinese (1.5%), other (0.7%) (2019/20 estimate)	
Cameroon	By ethnicity Bamileke-Bamum (24.3%), Beti/Bassa, Mbam (21.6%), Biu-Mandara (14.6%), Arabs-Choa/Hausa/Kanuri (11%), Adamawa-Ubangi, (9.8%), Grassfields(7.7%), Kako, Meka/Pygmies (3.3%), Cotier/Ngoe/Oroko (2.7%), Southwestern Bantu (0.7%), foreigners/other ethnic group (4.5%) (2018 estimate)	
Canada	By ethnicity Whites (69.8%), South Asians (7.1%), Native Canadians (5.0%), Chinese (4.7%), Afro-Canadians (4.3%), Southeast Asians (3.7%), Arabs (1.9%), Hispanics (1.6%), West Asians (1.0%), Koreans (0.6%), Japanese (0.3%) mixed (0.9%) Other (0.5%) (2021 census) By ancestry (most common); Canadians (descent from early settlers 15.6%), English (14.7%), Scots (12.1%), Irish (12.1%), French (11.0%), Germans (8.1%), Chinese (4.7%), Italians (4.3%), Indians (3.7%), Ukrainians (3.5%), First Nations (1.7%), Métis (1.5%) (2021 census)	White (Anglo-Canadians, Franco-Canadians, Germans, Ukrainians, Greeks, Russians, Italians, Dutch, Irish, Scottish, Portuguese, Polish, Norwegians, White South Africans, White Americans), Chinese, Hong Kongers (Chinese), Taiwanese, Korean, Japanese, Latinos (Colombians, Mexicans, Salvadorans, Cubans, Venezuelans), South Asians (Indians, Bengalis, Pakistanis, Sri Lankans), Vietnamese, Fijians, Black Novo Scotians, African Americans, Jamaicans, Black Guyanese, Haitians, Cameroonians, Ivorians, Nigerians, Somalis, Ethiopians, Kenyans, Ghanaians, Arabs (Lebanese, Moroccans, Algerians, Tunisians, Syrians, Emiratis, Iraqis), Persians, Iranian Azerbaijanis, Armenians, Afghans, Native Americans, Mixed
Cape Verde	By ethnicity Mulatto (71%), Africans (28%), Whites (1%) (estimate)	
Cayman Islands	By ethnicity Mixed (40%), Whites (20%), Blacks (20%), Foreigner (20%) (estimate)	
Central African Republic	By ethnicity Gbaya (28.8%), Banda (22.9%), Mandja (9.9%), Sara (7.9%), Mbaka (7.9%), Arabs-Fula (6%), Mbum 6%, Ngbandi (5.5%), Azande (3%), other (2%), foreigners (0.1%) (2003 estimate)	
Chad	By ethnicity Sara (26.6%), Arabs (12.9%), Kanembu (8.5%), Masalit (7.2%), Tubu (6.9%), Masa (4.8%), Bidiyo (3.7%), Bilala (3.7%), Maba (3.0%), Daju (2.6%), Mundang (1.5%), Gabri (2.4%), Zaghawa (2.4%), Fula (2.1%), Tupuri (2.0%), Tama (1.6%), Karo (1.4%), Bagirmi (1.3%), Masmaje (1.0% ), other (2.6%), foreigners (0.7%) (2009 census)	
Chile	By ethnicity White and Mestizo (88.9%), Mapuche (9.1%), Aymara (0.7%), other Native Chileans (0.3% including Rapanu, Quechua and others) (2012 estimate)	Mapuche, Basque, Irish, English, Haitians, Venezuelans, Croats, Germans, Mestizos, Palestinian
China	By ethnicity Han Chinese (91.1%), Zhuang (1.4%), Uyghurs (0.8%), Miao (0.8%), Manchu (0.7%), Yi (0.7%), Tujia (0.7%), Tibetans (0.5%), Mongols (0.5%), other (2.1%, including Dong, Yao, Koreans and over 100 others) (2020 census)	
Christmas Island	By ethnicity Chinese (70%), Europeans (20%), Malays (10%) (2001 estimate)	
Cocos (Keeling) Islands	By ethnicity Europeans, Cocos Malays	
Colombia	By ethnicity Mestizo and White (87.6%), Afro-Colombians (6.8%), Native Colombians (4.4%) (2018 census) By ethnic estimation Mestizos (47.4%), Whites (25.3%), Afro-Colombians (14.3%), Native Colombians (10.4%), Other (2.7%) (2018 estimate)	Mestizos, Afro-Colombians, Venezuelans, Native American, Syrian Christian Arabs, Lebanese Christian Arabs, Italians, Jews
Comoros	By ethnicity Comorians (97.1%, Mixture of Bantu, Malagasy and Arabs), Makua (1.6%), other (1.3%) (2000 estimate)	
Democratic Republic of the Congo	By ethnicity Over 200 ethnic groups. The four largest groups - Shi, Mongo, Luba, Bakongo (all Bantu) and the Mangbetu-Azande (Hamitic) - make up about 50% of the population.	
Republic of the Congo	By ethnicity Bakongo (40.5%), Teke (16.9%), Mbochi (13.1%), foreigners (8.2%), Sanga (5.6%), Mbere/Mbuti/Kele (4.4%), Punu (4.3%), Pygmies (1.6%), Oubanguiens (1.6%), Duma (1.5%), Makaa (1.3%), unspecified (1%) (2014 /15 estimate)	
Cook Islands	By ethnicity Cook Islands Maori (81.3%), mixed (6.7%), other (11.9%) (2011 estimate)	
Costa Rica	By ethnicity Whites and Mestizo (83.6%), Mulatto (6.7%), Native Costa Rican (2.4%), Afro–Costa Ricans (1.1%), other (4%), unspecified (2.2%) (2011 estimate)	
Cuba	By ethnicity Whites (64.1%), Mulattos (26.6%), Afro-Cubans (9.3%) (2012 census)	
Croatia	By ethnicity Croats (91.6%), Serbs (3.2%), Bosniaks (0.6%), Romani (0.5%), other (1.7%, including Albanians, Italians, Hungarians and others), unspecified (2.4%) (2021 census)	
Curaçao	By place of birth Curaçao (75.4%), Netherlands (6%), Dominican Republic (3.6%), Colombia (3%), Bonaire, Sint Eustatius and Saba (1.5%), Haiti (1.2%), Suriname (1.2%), Venezuela (1.1%), Aruba (1.1%), other (5%), unspecified (0.9%) (2011 estimate)	
Cyprus	By ethnicity (only Cypriot citizens in Southern Cyprus); Greek Cypriots (98.8%), other (1%, Maronites, Armenians, Cypriot Turks and others), unspecified (0.2%) (2011 census)	
Czech Republic	By nationality Czechs (89.7%), Ukrainians (5.9%), Slovaks (1.1%), Vietnamese (0.6%), Russians (0.4%), other (2.3%) (2022 estimate)	
Denmark	By national origin Danes (84.6%, including national minorities such as the German minority), immigrants and their descendants (15.4%, including Turks, Poles, Romanians, Syrians, Ukrainians, Germans, Iraqis and others) (2023 estimate)	
Djibouti	By ethnicity Somalis (60%), Afar (35%), other (5% including Arabs, French, Italians, Ethiopians and others) (estimate)	
Dominica	By ethnicity Afro-Dominicans (84.5%), mixed (9%), Kalinago (3.8%), other (2.1%), unspecified (0.6%) (2011 estimate)	
Dominican Republic	By ethnicity Multiracial (70.4%, Mulatto and Mestizo), Afro-Dominicans (15.8%), Whites (13.5%), other (0.3%) (2014 estimate)	
Ecuador	By ethnicity Mestizo (71.9%), Montubio (7.4%), Native Ecuadorian (7.0%, including Quechua and others), Whites (6.1%), Afro-Ecuadorians (4.3%), Mulatto (1.9%), other (1.5%) (2010 census)	
Egypt	By nationality Egyptians (99.7%), others (0.3%) (2006 est.) By ethnicity Egyptian Arabs, Fellah, Sa'idi (Upper-Egyptians), Copts, Bedouin, Nubians, Berbers, Circassians, Beja, Greeks, Armenians, Turks, Albanians and more	Arabs, Copts, Armenian, Turks, Nubians, Greeks, Syrians
El Salvador	By ethnicity Mestizo (86.3%), Whites (12.7%), Indigenous (0.2% including Lenca, Cacaopera, Pipil and others), Afro-Salvadorans (0.1%), other (0.6%) (2007 estimate)	
Equatorial Guinea	By ethnicity Fang (85.7%), Bubi (6.5%), Kombe (3.6%), Annobonese (1.6%), Bujeba (1.1%), other (1.4%) (1994 estimate)	
Eritrea	By ethnicity Tigrinya (50%), Tigre (30%), Saho (4%), Afar (4%), Kunama (4%), Bilen (3%), Beja (2%), Nara (2%), Rashaida (1%) (2021, estimate)	
Estonia	By ethnicity Estonians (69.1%), Russians (23.6%), Ukrainians (2.1%), Belarusians (0.9%), Finns (0.6%), Latvians (0.3%), other (3.4%) (2021 census)	
Ethiopia	By ethnicity Oromo (35.8%), Amhara (24.1%), Somalis (7.2%), Tigray (5.7%), Sidama (4.1%), Gurage (2.6%), Wolayta (2.3%), Afar (2.2%), Silt'e (1.3%), Kaffa (1.2%), other (13.5%, including Hadiya, Gedeo, Gumuz, Nuer and dozens more) (2022 estimate)	
Eswatini	By ethnicity Majority Swazi, minority Zulus and Whites (estimate)	
Falkland Islands	By nationality Falkland Islanders (48.3%), British (23.1%), St. Helenians (7.5%), Chileans (4.6%), mixed (6%), other (8.5%), unspecified 2% (2016 estimate)	
Faroe Islands	By place of birth Faroe Islands (85.3%), Denmark (8.3%), other Nordic countries (1.4%), other (4.5% including Philippines, Poland, Romania and others) (2022 est.)	
Fiji	By ethnicity Fijians (56.8%, Melanesian and Polynesian descent), Indo-Fijians (37.5%), Rotumans (1.2%), other (4.5%, including Whites, mixed, Chinese and others) (2007 estimate)	
Finland	By language Finnish (87.3%), Swedish (5.2%), Russian (1.5%), Estonian (0.9%), Arabic (0.6%), English (0.4%), Somali (0.4%), Kurdish (0.3%), Persian (0.3%), other (3.7%) (2019 estimate)	
France	By ethnicity The collection of official estimates of ethnicity and race is prohibited in France. Ethnic groups in the country are the French and native minorities such as Corsicans, Bretons, Basques and Alsatians. In addition, numerous immigrants and their descendants live in France, including from Europe (Italians, Spaniards, Portuguese, Romanians), North Africa (Algerians, Tunisians, Moroccans), Sub-Saharan Africa (Congolese, Senegalese) Asia (Vietnamese), Armenians, Jews and the French overseas territories. Around 15 to 20% of the population in 2000 were of non-Western origin.	French, Corsicans, Basques, Bretons, Normans, Alsatians, Catalans, Italians, Spaniards, Portuguese, Romanians, Poles, Germans, Franco-Swiss, Belgians, British, Turkish, Algerians, Tunisians, Moroccans, Mauritians, Comorians, Malagasy, Chinese, Japanese, Cambodians, Vietnamese, Indians, Sri Lankans, Brazilians, Black Africans (Senegalese, Cameroonian, Congolese, Angolans, Ivorians, Mauritanian, Guinean, Malian), Haitian, Lebanese, Martiniquan, Guadeloupean, Egyptian, Armenian, Jews, Syrian, Pakistani, Russian, Cape Verdean, Serbs, Greek, White Americans
French Polynesia	By ethnicity Polynesians (78%), Chinese (12%), French (10%) (estimate)	
Gabon	By ethnicity Gabonese (80.1%, including Fang 23.2%, Shira-Bapunu/Vili 18.9%, Nzabi-Duma 11.3%, Mbede-Teke 6.9%, Myene 5%, Kota-Kele 4.9%, Okande-Tsogo 2.1%, Pygmies 0.3%, other 7.5%), Foreigners (19.9%, including Cameroonians 4.6%, Malians 2.4%, Beninese 2.1%, naturalized Gabonese 1.6%, Togolese 1.6%, Senegalese 1.1%, Congolese (Republic of Congo) 1%, other 5.5% including Congolese (DRC), Equatorial Guineans, Nigerians and others) (2012 estimate)	
Gambia	By ethnicity Mandinka/Jahanka (33.3%), Fula/Tukolur/Lorobo (18.2%), Wolof (12.9%), Jola/Karoninka (11%), Serahuleh (7.2%), Serer (3.5%), other (4%), foreigners (9.9%) (2019/20 estimate)	
Germany	By national origin Germans (71.3%), Turks/Kurds (3.4%), Russians/Russia Germans (1.6%), Kazakhs/Kazakhstan Germans (1.6%), Syrians (1.5%), Romanians (1.1%), Italians (1.1%), Ukrainians (0.7%), Kosovars (0.7%), other (15.1%, including Greeks, Lebanese, Serbs, Spaniards, Bulgarians and others), unspecified (1.9%) (2022 estimate) By region of birth Germany (81.7%), Rest of Europe (11.7%), Asia (5.2%), Africa (0.9%), Americas (0.5%) (2022 estimate)	
Georgia	By ethnicity (without Abkhazia and South Ossetia); Georgians (86.8%), Azerbaijanis (6.3%), Armenians (4.5%), other (4.5% including Russians, Ukrainians, Ossetians, Yazidis, Greeks, Kists and others) (2014 estimate)	
Ghana	By ethnicity Akan (45.7%), Mole-Dagbon (18.5%), Ewe (12.8%), Ga-Dangme (7.1%), Gurma (6.4%), Guang (3.2%) ), Mandé (2.0%), other (1.6%) (2016 estimate)	
Gibraltar	By nationality Gibraltarians (79%), other British (13.2%), Spaniards (2.1%), Moroccans (1.6%), other EU citizens (2.4%), other (1.6%) (2012 estimates)	
Greece	By citizenship Greeks (91.6%), Albanians (4.4%), other (4.0%) (2011 census)	
Greenland	By place of birth Greenland (89.1%), Denmark (7.5%), other Nordic countries (0.9%), other (2.5%) (2022 estimate)	
Grenada	By ethnicity Afro-Grenadians (82.4%), mixed (13.3%), Indian (2.2%), other (1.3%), unspecified (0.9%) (2011 estimate)	
Guam	By ethnicity Chamorro (37.3%), Filipinos (26.3%), White (7.1%), Chuukese (7%), Koreans (2.2%), Other Pacific Islanders (2%), Other Asian (2% ), Chinese (1.6%), Palauans (1.6%), Japanese (1.5%), Pohnpeians (1.4%), mixed (9.4%), Other (0.6%) (2010 census)	
Guatemala	By ethnicity Mestizo (56%), Maya (41.7%), other Native Guatemalans (1.8%), Afro-Guatemalans (0.2%), Garifuna (0.1%), foreigners (0.2%) (2018 Census)	
Guernsey	By place of birth Guernsey (53.1%), UK and Ireland (23.9%), Portugal (2.2%), Latvia (1.5%), other Europe (2.8%), other (4.4%) ), unspecified (11.4%), (2020 estimate)	
Guinea	By ethnicity Fula (33.4%), Malinke (29.4%), Susu (21.2%), Kpelle (7.8%), Kissi (6.2%), Loma (1.6%), other/foreigners (0.4%) (2018 estimate)	
Guinea-Bissau	By ethnicity Balanta (30%), Fula (30%), Manjak (14%), Mandinka (13%), Pepel (7%), other (6%) (2015 estimate)	
Guyana	By ethnicity Indo-Guyanese (39.8%), Afro-Guyanese (29.3%), mixed (19.9%), Native Guyanese (10.5%), Other (0.5% including Whites, Chinese and others) (2012 estimate)	
Haiti	By ethnicity Afro-Haitians (95%), Mulatto, Whites and other (5%) (estimate)	
Honduras	By ethnicity Mestizo (90%), Indigenous Hondurans (7%), Afro-Hondurans (2%), Whites (1%) (estimate)	
Hong Kong	By ethnicity Chinese (91.6%), Filipinos (2.7%), Indonesians (1.9%), Whites (0.8%), Indians (0.6%), Other (2.4% including Nepalese, Pakistanis, Thais and others) (2021 Census)	
Hungary	By ethnicity Hungarians (85.6%), Romani (3.2%, according to other estimates 5–10%), Germans (1.9%), other (2.6%), unspecified (14.1%) (2011 census)	
Iceland	By place of birth Iceland (81.3%), Poland (5.6%), Denmark (1.0%), other (12.1% including, Lithuania, United States, Philippines, Germany and others) (2021 estimate)	
India	By language family Indo-Aryans (72%), Dravidians (25%), other (3%, Sino-Tibetans, Austro-Asiatics, Andamanese, Indigenous tribes, Anglo-Indians and others) (2000 estimate) By mother tongue Hindi speakers (43.6%), Bengalis (8.3%), Marathis (6.9%), Telugus (6.7%), Tamils (5.7%), Gujaratis (4.6%), Urdu speakers (4.2% ), Kannadigas (3.6%), Odias (3.1%), Malayalis (2.9%), Punjabis (2.7%), Assamese (1.3%), other (16.3%) (2011 census)	
Indonesia	By ethnicity Javanese (40.1%), Sundanese (15.5%), Malays (3.7%), Batak (3.6%), Madurese (3%), Betawi (2.9%), Minangkabau (2, 7%), Buginese (2.7%), Bantenese (2%), Banjarese (1.7%), Balinese (1.7%), Acehnese (1.4%), Dayak (1.4%), Sasak (1.3%), Chinese (1.2%), other (15%) (2010 estimate)	
Iraq	By ethnicity Arabs (75-80%), Kurds (15-20%), other (5% including Turkmens, Yazidis, Shabaks, Bedouin, Romani, Assyrians, Afro-Iraqis, Circassians, Mandeans, Persians and others) (1987 estimate)	
Iran	By ethnicity Persians (65%), Azerbaijanis (16%), Kurds (7%), Lurs (6%), Arabs (2%), Balochs (2%), Turkmens (1%), Qashqai (1%), other (1%, including Armenians, Afro-Iranians, Georgians, Assyrians, Circassians and others) (2008 estimate)	
Ireland	By ethnicity White (87.4%, of which White Irish 76.5%, Pavee 0.7%, Other White 10.1%), Asians (3.7%), Blacks (1.5%), mixed (1.3%), other and unspecified (6.2%) (2022 census)	
Isle of Man	By ethnicity White (94.1%), Asians (3.1%), mixed (1.0%), Blacks (0.6%), other (0.4%) (2021 Census)	
Israel	By ethnicity Jews (74%), Arab Israelis (21.1%), other (4.9% including Arameans, Armenians, Assyrians, Circassians and others) (2020 estimate) By place of birth (only Jews); Israel (78.7%), Europe/Americas/Oceania (14.8%), Africa (4.2%), Asia (2.3%) (2020 estimate)	
Italy	By place of birth Italy (89.4%), Romania (1.8%), Morocco (0.7%), Albania (0.7%) China (0.5%), Ukraine (0.4%), India (0.3%), Bangladesh (0.3%) and other (5.9%) (2022 estimate) By ethnicity Italians, smaller groups of Tyroleans, French and Slovenes to the north and Greeks and Albanians to the south, migrants and their descendants	
Ivory Coast	By ethnicity Akan (28.9%), Gur (16.1%), Northern Mandé (14.5%), Kru (8.5%), Southern Mandé (6.9%), unspecified (0.9%), Foreigners (24.2%) (2014 estimate)	
Jamaica	By ethnicity Afro-Jamaicans (92.1%), mixed (6.1%), Indians (0.8%), other (0,4%, Chinese, Whites and others), unspecified (0.7%) (2011 census)	
Japan	By nationality Japanese (97.9%), Chinese (0.6%), Koreans (0.4%), other (1,1% including Vietnamese, Filipinos, Brazilians and others) (2017 estimate)	
Jersey	By place of birth Jersey (44.4%), United Kingdom (30.5%), Portugal (9.4%), Poland (3.0%), Ireland (2.1%), other (10.6%) (2021 estimate)	
Jordan	By nationality Jordanians (69.3%), Syrians (13.3%), Palestinians (6.7%), Egyptians (6.7%), Iraqis (1.4%), other (2.6%) (2015 Census)	
Kazakhstan	By ethnicity Kazakhs (70.7%), Russians (15.2%), Uzbeks (3.3%), Ukrainians (1.9%), Uyghurs (1.5%), Germans (1.1%), Tatars (1.1%), Azerbaijanis (0.8%), Koreans (0.6%), other (3.9% including Turkmens, Tajiks, Dungan and others) (2023 estimate)	
Kenya	By ethnicity Kikuyu (17.1%), Luhya (14.3%), Kalendjin (13.4%), Luo (10.7%), Kamba (9.8%), Somalis (5.8%), Kisii (5.7%), Mijikenda (5.2%), Meru (4.2%), Maasai (2.5%), Turkana (2.1%), foreigners (1%), other (8.2%, including Whites, Arabs, Indians, Chinese and others) (2019 census)	
Kiribati	By ethnicity I-Kiribati (95.8%), mixed (3.8%), Tuvaluans (0.2%), other (1.7%) (2020 estimate)	
Kyrgyzstan	By ethnicity Kyrgyz (73.8%), Uzbeks (14.8%), Russians (5.1%), Dungans (1.1%), Uyghurs (0.9%), Tajiks (0.9%), Turkmens (0.7%), Kazakhs (0.6%), other (2.1%, including Tatars, Azerbaijanis, Koreans and others) (2021 census)	
Kosovo	By ethnicity Albanians (91.8%), Serbs (2.3%), Bosniaks (1.7%), Turks (1.2%), Ashkali (1.0%), others (2.0%) (2024 census)	
Kuwait	By ethnicity Asians (40.3%), Kuwaiti (30.4%), other Arabs (27.4%), Africans (1%), other (0.9%, including Europeans, North Americans, South Americans and Australians) (2018 estimate)	
Laos	By ethnicity Lao (53.2%), Khmu (11%), Hmong (9.2%), Phu Thai (3.4%), Tai (3.1%), Bru (2.5%), Katang (2.2%), Lue (2%), Akha (1.8%), other (11.6%, dozens to hundreds of other ethnic groups) (2015 census)	
Lesotho	By ethnicity Sotho (99.7%), other (0.3%, Zulu, San, and others) (estimate)	
Latvia	By ethnicity Latvians (62.7%), Russians (24.5%), Belarusians (3.1%), Ukrainians (2.2%), Poles (2%), Lithuanians (1.1%), other (1.8%), unspecified (2.6%) (2021 census)	
Lebanon	By ethnicity Levantine Arabs (95%, Maronites, Sunnis, Shia, Greek Orthodox and others), Armenians (4%), other (1%, including Kurds, Turks, Assyrians, Europeans and others) (estimate)	
Liberia	By ethnicity Kpelle (20.3%), Bassa (13.4%), Grebo (10%), Gio (8%), Mano (7.9%), Kru (6%), Loma (5.1%), Kissi (4.8%), Gola (4.4%), Krahn (4%), Vai (4%), Mandingo (3.2%), Gbandi (3%), Mende (1.3%), Krahn (1.3%), other Liberians (1.7%), other Africans (1.4%), non-Africans (0.1%) (2008 estimate)	
Libya	By ethnicity Arabs and Berbers (97%), other (3% including Black Africans, Turks, Indians, Italians, Maltese and others) (estimate)	
Lithuania	By ethnicity Lithuanians (84.6%), Poles (6.5%), Russians (5.0%), Belarusians (1.0%), Ukrainians (0.5%), other (0.6%), unspecified (1.8%) (2021 census)	
Liechtenstein	By nationality Liechtensteiners (65.6%), Swiss (9.6%), Austrians (5.8%), Germans (4.5%), Italians (3.1%) other (11.4%) (2021 estimate)	
Luxembourg	By nationality Luxembourgers (52.9%), Portuguese (14.5%), French (7.6%), Italians (3.7%), Belgians (3.0%), Germans (2.0%), Spaniards (1.3%), Romanians (1%), other (14% including British, Poles, Dutch, Chinese and others) (2022 estimate)	
Macau	By ethnicity Chinese (88.7%), Portuguese (1.1%), Macanese (1.1%), other (9.2%) (2016 estimate)	
Madagascar	By ethnicity Merina (26%), Betsimisaraka (15%), Betsileo (12%), Tsimihety (7%), Sakalava (6%), Antaisaka (5%), Antandroy (5%), other (24%) (2007 estimate)	
Malawi	By ethnicity Chewa (34.3%), Lomwe (18.8%), Wayao (13.2%), Ngoni (10.4%), Tumbuka (9.2%), Sena (3.8%), Mang' anja (3.2%), Tonga (1.8%), Nyanja (1.8%), Nkhonde (1%), other (2.2%), foreigners (0.3%) (2018 census)	
Malaysia	By ethnicity Bumiputra (69.7%, of which 57.3% are Malays and 12.4% are indigenous people), Chinese (22.9%), Indian (6.6%), other (0.8%) (2021 census)	
Maldives	By ethnicity Maldivians (mixture of Sinhalese, Dravidians, Arabs, Austroasiatic peoples and Africans) (estimate)	
Mali	By ethnicity Bambara (33.3%), Fula (13.3%), Soninke (9.8%), Senufo (9.6%), Malinke (8.8%), Dogon (8.7%), Songhai (5.9%), Bobo (2.1%), Tuareg (1.7%), foreigners (0.7%), other (6.0%) (2018 estimate)	
Malta	By nationality Maltese (78%) and foreigners (22%) (2021 estimate)	
Morocco	By ethnicity (excluding Western Sahara); Arabs and Berbers (99%), other (1%) (estimate)	
Marshall Islands	By ethnicity Marshallese (92.1%), mixed (5.9%), other (2%) (2006 estimate)	
Mauritania	By ethnosocial group Haratin/Black Moors (40%), Beidane/White Moors (30%), Black Africans (30% including Fula, Soninke, Bambara, Tukulor, Wolof and others) (estimate)	
Mauritius	By ethnicity Indo-Mauritian (about two-thirds of total population), Creoles, Chinese, Europeans, Black Africans (estimate)	
Mexico	By ethnicity Mestizo (62%), majority Native Mexicans (21%), Native Mexicans (7%), other (10% including Europeans, Arabs, Asians, Afro-Mexicans) (2012 estimate)	
Federated States of Micronesia	By ethnicity Chuukese (49.3%), Pohnpeians (29.8%), Kosraeans (6.3%), Yapese (5.7%), Outer Yap Islanders (5.1%), Polynesians (1.6%), Asians (1.4%), other (0.8%) (2010 estimate)	
Moldova	By ethnicity (excluding Transnistria); Moldovans (75.1%), Romanians (7%), Ukrainians (6.6%), Gagauz (4.6%), Russians (4.1%), Bulgarians (1.9%), other (0.8%) (2014 census)	
Monaco	By place of birth Monaco (32.1%), France (19.9%), Italy (15.3%), United Kingdom (5.0%), Belgium (2.3%), Switzerland (2.0%), Germany (1.9%), Russia (1.8%), United States (1.1%), Netherlands (1.1%), Morocco (1.0%), other (16.6%) (2016 estimate)	
Mongolia	By ethnicity Khalkha Mongols (83.8%), Kazakhs (3.8%), Durvud Mongols (2.6%), Bayad Mongols (2.0%), Buryats (1.4%), Zakhchin Mongols (1.2%), Dariganga Mongols (1.1%), other (4.1%) (2020 census)	
Montenegro	By ethnicity Montenegrins (45%), Serbs (28.7%), Bosniaks (8.7%), Albanians (4.9%), Muslims (3.3%), Romani (1%), Croats (1%), other (2.6%), unspecified (4.9%) (2011 census)	
Montserrat	By ethnicity Blacks (86.2%), mixed (4.8%), Hispanics (3%), Whites (2.7%), Indians (1.6%), other (1.8%) (2018 census)	
Mozambique	By ethnicity Black Africans (99% Makua, Tsonga, Shona/Shonic peoples Lomwe, Sena and others), Mestiço (0.8%, European and African descent), other (0.2%, Whites, Indians, Pakistanis, Chinese) (2017 census)	
Myanmar	By ethnicity Bamar (68%), Shan (9%), Karen (7%), Rohingya (4%), Chinese (3%), Indians (2%), Mon (2%), other (5%, 135 recognized ethnic groups) (estimate)	
Namibia	By ethnicity Ovambo (50%), Kavangos (9%), Herero (7%), Damara (7%), Coloreds (6.5%), Whites (6%), Nama (5%), Lozi (4%), San (3%), Basters (2%), Tswana (0.5%) (estimate)	
Nauru	By ethnicity Nauruans (88.9%), mixed (6.6%), I-Kiribati (2%), other (2.5% including Chinese, Europeans, Indians and others) (2007 estimate)	
Nepal	By ethnicity/caste Chhettri (16.5%), Bahun (11.3%), Magar (6.9%), Tharu (6.2%), Tamang (5.6%), Bishwokarma (5%), Muslims (4.9%), Newar (4.6%), Yadav (4.2%), Rai (2.2%), Pariyar (1.9%), Gurung (1.9%), Thakuri (1.7%), Mijar (1.6%), Teli (1.5%), Limbu (1.4%), Chamar (1.4%), Koiri (1.2%), other (20%, over 100 ethnic groups/caste) (2021 census) By language Nepali (44.9%), Maithili (11.1%), Bhojpuri (6.2%), Tharu (5.9%) Tamang (4.9%), Bajjika (3.9%), Awadhi (3%), Newar (3%), Magar Dhut (2.8%), Doteli (1.7%), Urdu (1.4%), Limbu (1.2%), Gurung (1.1%), other (8.9%) (2021 Census)	
New Caledonia	By ethnicity Kanak (39.1%), Europeans (27.1%), Wallisian, Futunian (8.2%), Tahitians (2.1%), Indonesians (1.4%), Ni-Vanuatu (1%), Vietnamese (0.9%), other (17.7%), unspecified (2.5%) (2014 estimate)	
New Zealand	By ethnicity Europeans (64.1%), Maori (16.5%), Chinese (4.9%), Indians (4.7%), Samoans (3.9%), Tongans (1.8%), Cook Islands Māori (1.7%), English (1.5%), Filipinos (1.5%), New Zealander (1%), other (13.7%) (2018 estimate)	
Nicaragua	By ethnicity Mestizo (69%), Whites (17%), Afro-Nicaraguans (9%), Native Nicaraguans (5%) (estimate)	
Netherlands	By national origin Dutch (74.8%), Turks/Kurds (2.4%), Moroccans (2.4%), Surinamese (2.1%), Indonesians (2.0%), Germans (2.0%), Poles (1.3%), Syrians (0.7%), Belgians (0.7%), other (11.6% including British, Chinese, Iraqis and others) (2022 estimate)	
Niger	By ethnicity Hausa (53.1%), Songhai (21.2%), Tuareg (11%), Fula (6.5%), Kanuri (5.9%), Gurma (0.8%), Arabs (0.4%), Tubu (0.4%), other (0.9%) (2006 estimate)	
Nigeria	By ethnicity Hausa (30%), Yoruba (15.5%), Igbo (15.2%), Fula (6.0%), Tiv (2.4%), Kanuri (2.4%), Ibibio (1.8%), Ijaw (1.8%), other (24.9%, more than 200 ethnic groups) (2018 estimate)	
Niue	By ethnicity Niueans (65.4%), mixed (14%), other (20.6%) (2017 estimate)	
North Korea	By ethnicity Koreans (99.8%), other (0.2%, Chinese, Japanese and others) (estimate)	
North Macedonia	By ethnicity Macedonians (58.4%), Albanians (24.3%), Turks (3.9%), Romani (2.5%), Serbs (1.3%), Bosniaks (0.9%), Aromanians and Megleno-Romanians (0.5%), other (0.8%, including Bulgarians, Croats and others), unspecified (7.4%) (2021 census)	
Northern Cyprus	By ethnicity Turkish Cypriots and Turkish settlers (99.6%), Greeks Cypriots (0.2%), English (0.2%), Maronites (0.1%), other (0.3%), (2006 census)	
Northern Mariana Islands	By ethnicity Asians (50%, including Filipinos 35.3%, Chinese 6.8%, Korean 4.2%, and other Asian 3.7%), Indigenous Hawaiians and other Pacific Islanders (34.9%, including Chamorro 23.9%, Carolinians 4.6% and other 6.4%), other (2.5%), two or more races (12.7%) (2010 census)	
Norway	By migration status Norwegians without a migration background (75.5% including Sámi), Norwegians with migration background (9.7%), foreigners (14.8% including Poles, Lithuanians, Somalis, Syrians, Pakistanis, Swedes and others (2022 estimate)	
Oman	By nationality Omani (57.6%), foreigners (42.4%) (2023 estimate) By ethnicity Arabs, Balochs, South Asians (Indians, Pakistanis, Sri Lankans, Bangladeshis), Afro-Omanis (estimate)	
Pakistan	By ethnicity Punjabis (44.7%), Pashtuns (15.4%), Sindhis (14.1%), Saraiki (8.4%), Muhajir (7.6%), Balochs (3.6%), other (6.3%) (estimate) By language Punjabi (38.8%), Pashtun (18.2%), Sindhi (14.5%), Saraiki (12.2%), Urdu (7.1%), Baloch (3.0%), Hindko (2.4%), Brahui (1.2%) other (2.6%) (2017 census)	
Palau	By ethnicity Palauans (73%), Asians (21.7%), Carolinians (2%), Whites (1.2%), other (2015 estimate)	
Palestine	By ethnicity Gaza Strip - Palestinians (over 99%); West Bank and East Jerusalem - Palestinians (about 75%) and Jewish settlers (about 25%) (2019 estimate)	
Panama	By ethnicity Mestizo (65%), Native Americans (12.3%, including Guaymí 7.6%, Guna 2.4%, Emberá 0.9%, other 2.1%), Afro-Panamanians (9.2%), Mulatto (6.8%), Whites (6.7%) (2010 census)	
Papua New Guinea	By ethnicity Papuans, Melanesians, Negritos, Micronesians, Polynesians; hundreds of ethnic groups and tribes	
Paraguay	By ethnicity Mestizo (95%), other (5%, Whites, Native Paraguayans, Asians, Arabs) (estimate)	Mestizos, Italians, Guarani, German Mennonites, Chinese, Russians, Argentines
Peru	By ethnicity Mestizo (60.2%), Native Peruvians (25.8% including Aymara, Quechua and others), Whites (5.9%), Afro-Peruvians (3.6%), other (1.2% including Japanese, Chinese and others), unspecified (3.3%) (2017 census)	
Philippines	By ethnicity Tagalog (24.4%), Visayans (11.4%), Cebuano (9.9%), Ilocano (8.8%), Hiligaynon (8.4%), Bicolano (6.8%), Waray (4%), other (26.1%), foreigners (0.1%) (2010 estimate)	Filipinos (Tagalog, Visayans, Cebuano, Ilocano, Bicolano), Moro, Americans, Japanese, Arabs, Spaniards, Chinese
Pitcairn Islands	Descendants of Bounty mutineers and their Tahitian wives	
Poland	By ethnicity Poles (96.9%), Silesians (1.1%), Germans (0.2%), Ukrainians (0.1%), other and unspecified (1.1%) (2011 census)	Poles, Germans, Ukrainians, Russians, Belarusians, Lithuanians, Vietnamese, Black, Tatar, Kashubians, Silesians, Brazilians, Indians
Portugal	By nationality Portuguese (92.5%), Brazilians (2.3%), British (0.4%), Cape Verdeans (0.4%), Indians (0.3%), other (4.1%, including Italians, Angolans, French, Ukrainians and others) (2022 estimate)	
Puerto Rico	By ethnicity White (75.8%), Afro-Puerto Ricans (12.4%), mixed (3.3%), other (8.5%) (2010 census)	
Qatar	By nationality Foreigners (88.4% including Indians, Pakistanis, Nepalis, Filipinos, Indonesians and others), Qatari (11.6%) (2015 estimate)	
Rwanda	By ethnicity Hutu, Tutsi, Twa	
Romania	By ethnicity Romanians (89.3%), Hungarians (6%), Romani (3.4%, according to other estimates 5–11%), Ukrainians (0.3%), Germans (0.1%) (2021 census)	
Russia	By ethnicity Russians (80.9%), Tatars (3.6%), Chechens (1.3%), Bashkirs (1.2%), Chuvash (0.8%), Avars (0.8%), Armenians (0.7%), Ukrainians (0.7%), other (10%, including Dargins, Kabardians, Ingush, Kalmyks, Kazakhs and others) (2021 census, proportions refer to people who declared their ethnicity)	
Saint Barthélemy	By ethnicity French, Portuguese, Caribs, Blacks	
Saint Helena, Ascension and Tristan da Cunha	By ethnicity Blacks (50%), Whites (25%), Chinese (25%) (estimate)	
Saint Kitts and Nevis	By ethnicity Afro–Kittitians and Nevisians (92.5%), mixed (3%), Whites (2.1%), Indians (2.1%), other (0.6%), unspecified (0.3%) (2001 estimate)	
Saint Lucia	By ethnicity Afro–Saint Lucians (85.2%), mixed (10.9%), Indians (2.2%), other (1.6%), unspecified (0.1%) (2010 estimate)	
Saint Martin	By ethnicity Creoles (mulattoes), Blacks, Guadeloupe mestizos (French and East Asian descent), Whites, Indians, other (estimate)	
Saint Pierre and Miquelon	Descendants of Basque and Breton fishermen from France	
Saint Vincent and the Grenadines	By ethnicity Afro-Vincentians (71.2%), mixed (23.0%), Kalinago (3.0%), Indians (1.1%), Whites (1.5%), other (0.2%) (2012 estimate)	
Solomon Islands	By ethnicity Melanesians (95.3%), Polynesians (3.1%), Micronesians (1.2%), other (0.3%) (2009 estimate)	
Samoa	By citizenship Samoan (96%), Samoan and New Zealander (2%), other (1.9%) (2011 census)	
San Marino	By ethnicity Sanmarinese and Italians	
São Tomé and Príncipe	By ethnosocial group Mestiço (descendants of Portuguese and Africans), Angolares (descendants of Angolan slaves), Fernandino, Servicais (indentured laborers from Angola, Mozambique and Cape Verde), Tongas (children of Servicais born on the islands), Europeans (mainly Portuguese), Asians (mainly Chinese)	
Saudi Arabia	By nationality Saudis (58.4%), foreigners (41.6% including Indians, Pakistanis, Southeast Asians and others) (2022 census)	
Senegal	By ethnicity Wolof (39.7%), Fula (27.5%), Serer (16%), Mandinka (4.9%), Jola (4.2%), Soninke (2.4%), other (5.4%, including Europeans and Lebanese) (2019 estimate)	
Serbia	By ethnicity Serbs (80.6%), Hungarians (2.8%), Bosniaks (2.3%), Romani (2.0%, according to other estimates 5–11%), Albanians (0.9%), Croats (0.6%), Slovaks (0.6%), other (2.0%, including Timok Vlachs, Romanians and others), unspecified (8.2%) (2022 census)	
Seychelles	By ethnicity Predominantly Seychellois Creole (mainly of East African and Malagasy origin); also French, Indian, Chinese and Arab populations (estimate)	
Sierra Leone	By ethnicity Temne (35.4%), Mende (30.8%), Limba (8.8%), Kono (4.3%), Kuranko (4%), Fula (3.8%), Mandinka (2.8%), Loko (2%), Sherbro (1.9%), Creoles (1.2%, descendants of freed Jamaican slaves; also known as Krio), other (5%) (2019 estimate)	
Singapore	By ethnicity Chinese (74.2%), Malay (13.7%), Indians (8.9%), other (3.2% including Eurasians, Whites and others) (2021 census)	
Sint Maarten	By place of birth Sint Maarten (29.9%), Dominican Republic (10.2%), Haiti (7.8%), Jamaica (6.6%), Saint Martin (5.9%), Guyana (5%), Dominica (4.4%), Curaçao (4.1%), Aruba (3.4%), Saint Kitts and Nevis (2.8%), India (2.6%), Netherlands (2.2%), United States (1.6%), Suriname (1.4%), Saint Lucia (1.3%), Anguilla (1.1%), other (8%), unspecified (1.7%) (2011 census)	
Slovakia	By ethnicity Slovaks (83.8%), Hungarians (7.8%), Romani (1.2%, according to other estimates 7–11%), others (1.8%, including Ukrainians, Germans, Czechs, Poles, Russians and more), unspecified (5.4%) (2021 census)	
Slovenia	By ethnicity Slovenes (83.1%), Serbs (2%), Croats (1.8%), Bosniaks (1.1%), other or unspecified (12%) (2002 census)	
Somalia	By ethnicity Somalis (85%), other (15%, including Somali Bantus, Arabs and others) (estimate)	
Spain	By place of birth Spain (84.8%), Morocco (1.7%), Romania (1.2%), other (12.3% including Germany, Colombia, Ecuador, UK, Argentina and others) (2021, estimate) By language of native population Castilian Spanish (74%), Catalan (17%), Galician (7%), Basque (2%), Aranese (<1%) (2023 estimate)	Spaniards, Latinos (Colombians, Ecuadorians, Venezuelans, Cubans, Argentines, Peruvians, Dominicans, Hondurans), Catalans, Basques, French, British, Italians, Pakistani, Indian, Chinese, Ukrainian, Russian, Moroccans, Brazilians, Senegalese, Gambian, Filipinos, Americans, Romanians, Algerians, Nigerians, Equatorial Guineans, Roma, Canarians, Sephards, Bulgarians
Sri Lanka	By ethnicity Sinhalese (74.9%), Sri Lankan Tamils (11.2%), Sri Lankan Moors (9.2%), Indian Tamils (4.2%), other (0.5%) (2012 census)	
South Africa	By ethnicity Black Africans (80.9%, including Zulu, Xhosa, Tsonga, Sotho, Tswana, and others), Coloureds (8.8%), Whites (7.8%, including Boers and others), Asians (2.6%) (2021 estimate)	British, Afrikaneer, Germans, French, Italians, Greeks, Zimbabweans, Nigerians, Tswana, Zulu, Sotho, Swazi, Coloureds, Cape Malays, Indians
South Korea	By nationality Koreans (95.6%), foreigners (4.4% including Chinese, Vietnamese, Thai and others) (2022 estimate)	
South Ossetia	By ethnicity Ossetians (89.9%), Georgians (7.4%), Russians (1.1%), Armenians (0.7%), other (0.8%) (2015 census)	
Sudan	By ethnicity Sudanese Arabs (about 70%), Fur, Beja, Nuba, Nubians, Ingessana, Uduk, Fula, Masalit, Daju, Gimir, Tunjur, Berta; there are over 500 ethnic groups (estimate)	
South Sudan	By ethnicity Dinka (about 35-40%), Nuer (about 15%), Shilluk, Azande, Bari, Kakwa, Kuku, Murle, Mandari, Didinga, Ndogo, Bviri, Lndi, Anuak, Bongo, Lango, Dungotona, Acholi, Baka, Fertit (2011 estimate)	
Suriname	By ethnicity Indo-Surinamese (27.4%, descendants of North Indian immigrants), Maroons (21.7%, descendants of runaway slaves), Creoles (21.7%), Javanese (15.7%), mixed (13.4% ), other (7.6%), unspecified (0.6%) (2012 estimate)	
Sweden	By migration status Swedes without migrant background (65.4%), Swedes with migrant background (14.3%), foreigners (20.4% including Syrians, Iraqis, Finns, Poles, Iranians, Somalis and Afghans and others) (2022 estimate) By place of birth Sweden (80.3%), Syria (1.9%), Iraq (1.4%), Finland (1.4%), other (15%) (2020 estimate)	
Switzerland	By migration status (Population over 15 years); Swiss without a migration background (59.3%), Swiss with a migration background (39.2%) (2021 estimate) By place of birth Switzerland (69.2%), Germany (4.2%), Italy (3.2%), Portugal (2.5%), France (2.1%), Kosovo (1.1%), Turkey (1.0%), other (16.7%, including Serbia, North Macedonia, Austria and others) (2020 estimate)	Swiss (Germans, French, Italian), Turkish, Americans, Sri Lankans, Brazilians, Black Africans, Albanians, Serbs, Bosnians, Croats, Spaniards, Portuguese, Chinese, Indians, Cape Verdeans, Kosovars, Greeks, Eritreans
Svalbard	By nationality Norwegians (61.1%), foreigners (38.9% including Russians, Thais, Swedes, Filipinos, Ukrainians and others) (2021 estimate)	
Syria	By ethnicity Arabs (Levantines & Bedouin) ~80%, Kurds 9%, , other ~9% (includes Assyrians, Turkomans, Armenians) By religious group Sunni Islam 74%, Alawite Islam ~12%, Christianity 5%-10%, Druze 3%, other (Ismaili, Yazidi, Twelver Shia) 1%-2%	
Taiwan	By ethnicity Over 95% of Taiwan's population is Han Chinese, which includes Hoklo, Hakka and other mainland Chinese ethnic groups. Almost 2.4% belong to the indigenous peoples of Taiwan (16 recognized peoples). Small number of foreigners (Southeast Asians, Europeans, Americans)	
Tajikistan	By ethnicity Tajiks (84.3%, including Pamiri and Yaghnobis), Uzbeks (13.8%), other (2.0%, including Kyrgyz, Russians, Turkmens, Tatars, Arabs and others) (2014 estimate)	
Tanzania	By ethnicity Mainland – Black Africans 99% (of which 95% Bantu, consisting of more than 130 tribes), other 1% (comprising Asians, Europeans and Arabs); Zanzibar – Arabs, Black Africans and mixed race (2023 estimate)	
Thailand	By ethnicity Thai (75%), Chinese (14%), Malays (4%), other (7% including Indians, Khmer, Burmese, Whites and others) (2008 estimate) By nationality Thai (97.5%), Burmese (1.3%), other (1.1%), unspecified (0.1%) (2015 estimate)	
Timor-Leste	By ethnicity Austronesians (including Tetum, Mambai, Tokodede, Galoli, Kemak, Baikeno), Melanesian-Papua (including Bunak, Fataluku, Makalero), small Chinese, Mestiço and Portuguese minorities (estimate)	
Togo	By ethnicity Aja-Ewe/Mina (42.4%), Kabye/Tem (25.9%), Para-Gurma/Akan (17.1%), Akposso/Akebu (4.1%), Ana-Ife (3, 2%), other Togolese (1.7%), foreigners (5.2%), unspecified (0.4%) (2013/14 estimate)	
Tokelau	By ethnicity Tokelauan (64.5%), mixed (12.5%), Tuvaluan (7.5%), Samoan (5.8%), other Pacific Islanders (3.4%), other (5.6%), unspecified (0.8%) (2016 estimate)	
Tonga	By ethnicity Tongans (97%), mixed (0.8%), other (2.2%), unspecified (0.1%) (2016 estimate)	
Transnistria	By ethnicity Russians (29.1%), Moldovans (28.6%), Ukrainians (22.9%), Bulgarians (2.4%), Gagauz (1.1%), Belarusians (0.5%), other (1.6%) (2015 census)	
Trinidad and Tobago	By ethnicity Indo-Trinidadian and Tobagonian (35.4%), Afro–Trinidadians and Tobagonians (34.2%), mixed (23.0%), other (1.3%), unspecified (6.2%) (2011 estimate)	
Tunisia	By ethnicity Arab (98%), Europeans (1%), Jews and other (1%) (estimate)	
Turkey	By ethnicity Turks (70-75%), Kurds (19%), other (6-11% including Arabs, Albanians, Bosniaks, Circassians, Chechens, Georgians, Romani, Laz people and others) (2016 estimate)	Turks, Syrian Arabs, Kurds, Greeks, Armenians, Laz, Bosnians, Albanians, Bulgarians, Azerbaijanis, Circassians, Crimean Tatars, Ukrainians, Persians, Uzbeks, Afro-Turks, Roma, Chechens
Turkmenistan	By ethnicity Turkmens (85.6%), Uzbeks (5.8%), Russians (5.1%), Azerbaijanis (1.2%), other (3.5%, including Kazakhs, Balochs, Tatars, Armenians, Ukrainians and more) (2012 census)	
Turks and Caicos Islands	By ethnicity Afro-Turks and Caicos Islander (87.6%), Whites (7.9%), mixed (2.5%), Indians (1.3%) other (0.7%) (2006 estimate)	
Tuvalu	By ethnicity Tuvaluan (97%), mixed (2.4%), other (0.6%) (2017 estimate)	
Uganda	By ethnicity Baganda (16.5%), Banyankole (9.6%), Basoga (8.8%), Bakiga (7.1%), Iteso (7%), Lango (6.3%), Bagisu (4.9%), Acholi (4.4%), Lugbara (3.3%), other (32.1%) (2014 estimate)	
Ukraine	By ethnicity Ukrainians (77.8%), Russians (17.3%), Belarusians (0.6%), Moldovans (0.5%), Crimean Tatars (0.5%), Bulgarians (0.4%), Hungarians (0.3%), Romanians (0.3%), Poles (0.3%), Jews (0.2%), other (1.8%) (2001 census)	
Uruguay	By ethnicity Whites (87.7%), Afro-Uruguayans (4.6%), Native Uruguayans (2.4%), other (0.3%), unspecified (5%) (2011 estimate)	
United Arab Emirates	By ethnicity South Asians (59.4%) (including Indians 38.2%, Bangladeshis 9.5%, Pakistanis 9.4%, other 2.3%), Emiratis (11.6%), Egyptians (10.2%), Filipinos (6.1%), other (12.8%) (2015 estimate)	
United Kingdom	By ethnicity Whites (80.6%, including 74.4% White British and 6.2% White 'other'), Asians (9.3), Black (4.0%), mixed (2.9%), other (2.1%) (2021 census England and wales)	White British, Irish, Poles, Germans, English, Welsh, Scottish, Northern Irish, Indian, Nepalese, Chinese, Pakistani, Bangladeshi, Arabs, Russians, Portuguese, Greek Cypriots, Turkish, Turkish Cypriots, Kenyan, Nigerian, Ghanaian, Ugandan, Ivorian, Mauritian, Seychellian, Japanese, Fijian, Romanian, Somalis, Jamaicans, Trinidadians, Roma, Sri Lankans, Hong Kongers, White South Africans, Filipinos, Zimbabweans, Mixed, Trinidadians, Bahamians, Saint Vincentians, Emirati
United States	By ethnicity Whites (75.5%, including Non-Hispanic Whites 58.9%), African Americans (13.6%), Asian American (6.3%), two or more races (3.0%), Native Americans and Alaska Natives (1.3%), Indigenous Hawaiians and other Pacific Islanders (0.3%), Hispanics and Latinos of every ethnicity (19.1%) (2022 estimates) By ancestry (most common ancestry); Africans (13.6%), Germans (12.8%), Mexicans (11.2%), English (9.6%) Irish (9.5%), American (5.9%, descent from early settlers), Italians (5.3%), Poles (2.5%), French (1.9%), Puerto Ricans (1.7%), Scots (1.6%), Indians (1.3%), Chinese (1.3%), Norwegians (1.3%) (2021 estimate)	Anglo-Americans, Germans, Scandinavians, Italians, Russians, Poles, Dutch, Scottish, Irish, Chinese, Lebanese, Iraqis, Persians, Somalis, Nigerians, Ethiopians, Cameroonians, Ghanaians, Brazilians, Venezuelans, Colombians, Hondurans, Cubans, Mexicans, Salvadorans, Guatemalans, Hondurans, Canadians, Sicilians, Indians, Hmongs, Thais, Samoans, Tongans, African American, Haitian, Puerto Ricans, Filipinos, Koreans, Japanese, Armenians, Navajo, Cambodians, Cherokee, Native Hawaiian, Cape Verdeans, Tejanos, Ecuadorians, Jews, Portuguese, Pakistani, Greeks, Assyrians, Mixed, Jamaicans, Dominicans, Haitians
US Virgin Islands	By ethnicity Afro–Virgin Islanders (76%), Whites (15.6%), Asians (1.4%), others (4.9%), mixed (2.1%) (2010 Census)	
Uzbekistan	By ethnicity Uzbeks (84.5%), Tajiks (4.8%), Kazakhs (2.4%), Karakalpaks (2.2%), Russians (2.1%), Kyrgyz (0.8%), Turkmen (0.6%), Tatars (0.5%), Koreans (0.5%), other (1.6%) (2021 estimate)	
Vanuatu	By ethnicity Melanesians (99.2%), other (0.8%) (2016 estimates)	
Vatican City	By nationality Italians, Swiss, Argentines and other nationalities (2017 estimate)	
Venezuela	By ethnicity Mestizo, Europeans, Afro-Venezuelans, Arabs, Native Venezuelans	
Vietnam	By ethnicity Vietnamese (85.3%), Tày (1.9%), Thái (1.9%), Mường (1.5%), Khmer (1.4%), Mong (1.4%), Nung (1.1%), other (5.5%) (2019 census)	
Wallis and Futuna	By ethnicity Polynesians	
Yemen	By ethnicity Mostly Arabs, minority of Africans and South Asians	
Zambia	By ethnicity Bemba (21%), Tonga (13.6%), Chewa (7.4%), Lozi (5.7%), Nsenga (5.3%), Tumbuka (4.4%), Ngoni (4% ), Lala (3.1%), Kaonde (2.9%), Namwanga (2.8%), Lunda (2.6%), Mambwe (2.5%), Luvale (2.2%), Lamba (2.1%), Ushi (1.9%), Lenje (1.6%), Bisa (1.6%), Mbunda (1.2%), other (13.8%), unspecified (0.4%) (2010 census)	
Zimbabwe	By ethnicity Black Africans (99.4% including Shona(including Kalanga), Ndebele, Tonga, Chewa, Venda, Tswana and others), Whites (0.2%), Coloureds (0.2%), Asians (0.1%) (2012 census)	

== Lists of ethnic groups ==
By status:

- List of contemporary ethnic groups
- List of Indigenous peoples
- List of diasporas
- List of stateless nations

Regional lists:

- Ethnic groups in Asia
  - Ethnic groups in Northern Asia
    - List of ethnic groups in Russia
  - List of ethnic groups in East Asia
    - List of ethnic groups in China
    - List of ethnic groups in Japan
    - List of ethnic groups in North Korea
    - List of ethnic groups in South Korea
    - List of ethnic groups in Taiwan
  - List of indigenous peoples of Taiwan
- South Asian ethnic groups
  - Ethnic groups in Nepal
  - Ethnic groups in Pakistan
    - Demographics of Sindh
  - List of ethnic groups in Laos
  - Ethnic groups in Malaysia
  - List of ethnic groups in Vietnam
  - List of ethnic groups in Burma
  - Ethnic groups in the Middle East
- African people
  - Indigenous people of Africa
  - Ethnic groups in Chad
  - List of ethnic groups in Rivers State
  - List of ethnic groups in Tanzania
- European people
- Classification of indigenous peoples of the Americas
- List of Indigenous Australian group names
- Ethnoreligious group
