= Russian diaspora =

Community of Russian emigrants

Map of the Russian diaspora as of 2025. Russia > 1,000,000 > 100,000 > 10,000 > 1,000

The Russian diaspora is the global community of ethnic Russians. The Russian-speaking (Russophone) diaspora are the people for whom Russian language is the native language, regardless of whether they are ethnic Russians or not.

== History ==
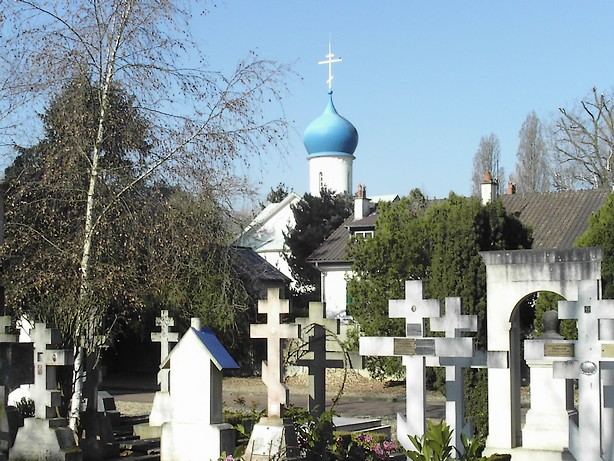
Sainte-Geneviève-des-Bois Russian Cemetery near Paris, the foremost necropolis of the White émigrés

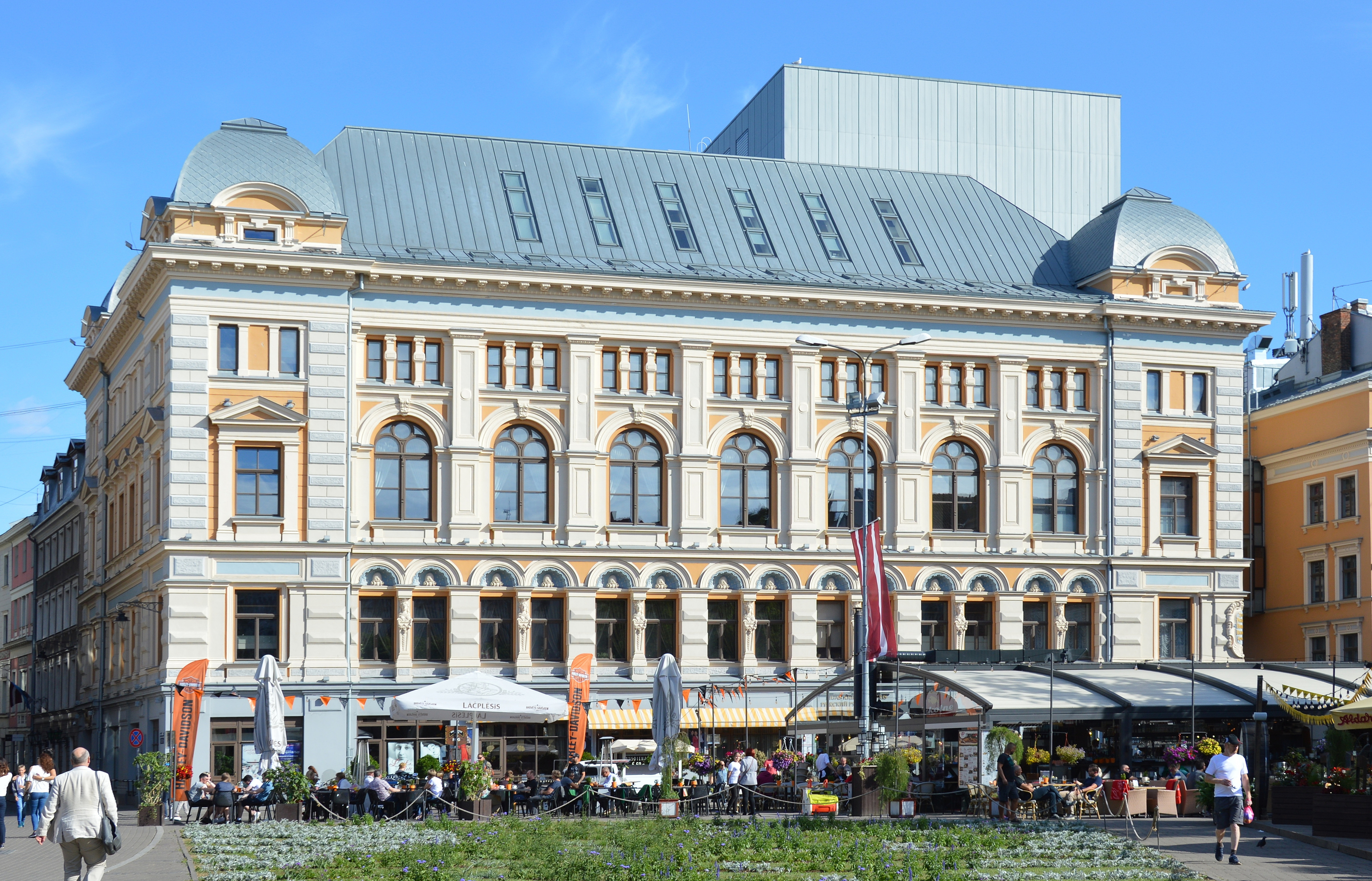
Mikhail Chekhov Riga Russian Theatre founded in 1883

A significant ethnic Russian emigration took place in the wake of the Old Believer schism in the 17th century (for example, the Lipovans, who migrated southwards around 1700). Later ethnic Russian communities, such as the Doukhobors (who emigrated to the Transcaucasus from 1841 and onwards to Canada from 1899) and the Molokans (who had emigrated to the United States, Georgia, Armenia, Kars, Azerbaijan, Australia, and Central Asia) Also emigrated as religious dissidents fleeing centrist authority. One of the religious minorities that had a significant effect on emigration from Russia was the Russian Jewish population.

In the twentieth century, Emigration from the Soviet Union is often broken down into three "waves" (волны) of emigration. The waves are the "First Wave", or "White Wave", which left during the Russian Revolution of 1917 and then the Russian Civil War; the "Second Wave", which emigrated during and after World War II; and the "Third Wave", which emigrated in the 1950s, 1960s, 1970s, and 1980s.

The Russo-Japanese War, World War I, and the Russian Revolution that became a civil war happened in quick succession from 1904 through 1923 with some overlap and heightened the strain on Russia and particularly the men expected to participate in military service. A major reason for young men specifically to emigrate out of Russia was to avoid forced service in the Russian army.

A sizable wave of ethnic Russians emigrated in the wake of the October Revolution of 1917 and the Russian Civil War of 1917–1922. They became known collectively as the White émigrés. That emigration is also referred to as the "first wave" even though previous emigrations had taken place, as it was comprised the first emigrants to have left in the wake of the Communist Revolution, and because it exhibited a heavily political character.

A smaller group of Russians, often referred to by Russians as the "second wave" of the Russian emigration, left during World War II. They were refugees, Soviet POWs, eastern workers, or surviving veterans of the Russian Liberation Army and other collaborationist armed units that had served under the German command and evaded forced repatriation. In the immediate postwar period, the largest Russian communities in the emigration settled in Germany, Canada, the United States, the United Kingdom, and Australia.

Following the establishment of the State of Israel, many Russian Jews fled to the country along with their non-Jewish relatives, with the current estimate of Russians in Israel totalling 300,000 (1,000,000 including Russian Jews who in the Soviet Union were not registered as Russians but rather as ethnic Jews).

Emigres who left after the death of Stalin but before perestroika, are often grouped into a "third wave". The emigres were mostly Jews, Armenians, Russian Germans. Most left in the 1970s.

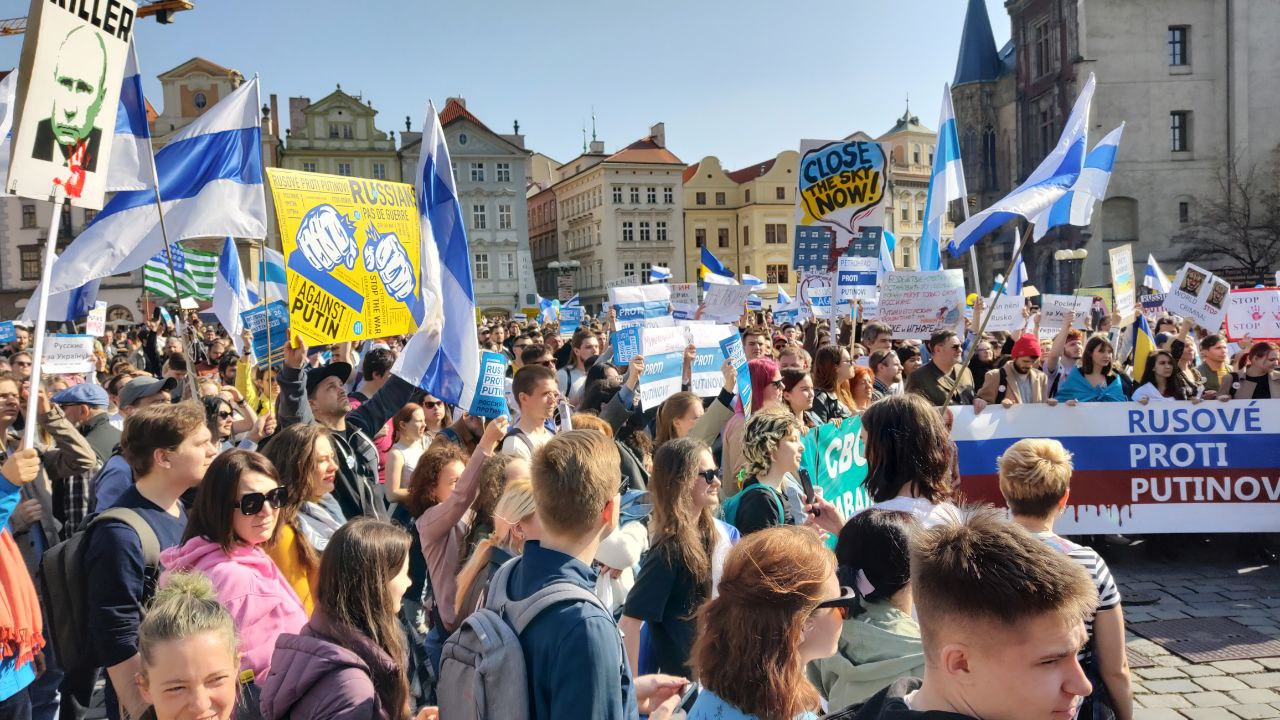
Protest of Russians living in the Czech Republic against the 2022 invasion of Ukraine

After the dissolution of the Soviet Union, Russia suffered an economic depression in the 1990s. This caused many Russians to leave Russia for Western countries. The economic depression ended in 2000. During this time, ethnic Russians who lived in other post-Soviet states moved to Russia.

Upon the start of the 2022 Russian invasion of Ukraine and the subsequent mobilization, hundreds of thousands of Russians have fled abroad.

== Statistics ==
Some 20 to 30 million ethnic Russians are estimated to live outside the bounds of the Russian Federation (depending on the definition of "ethnicity"). The number of native speakers of the Russian language who resided outside of the Russian Federation was estimated as close to 30 million by SIL Ethnologue in 2010.

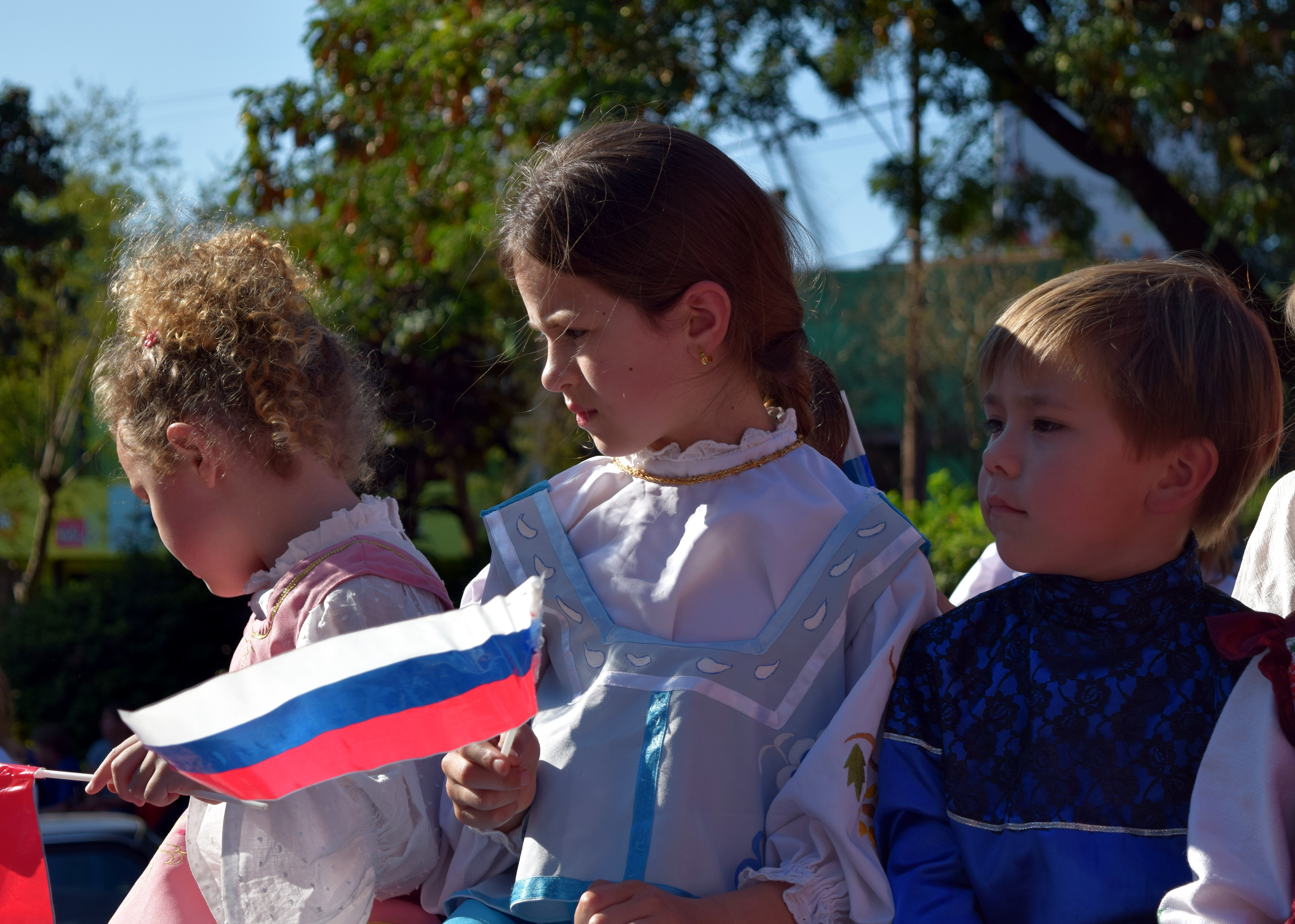
Immigrants’ Festival in Misiones, Argentina

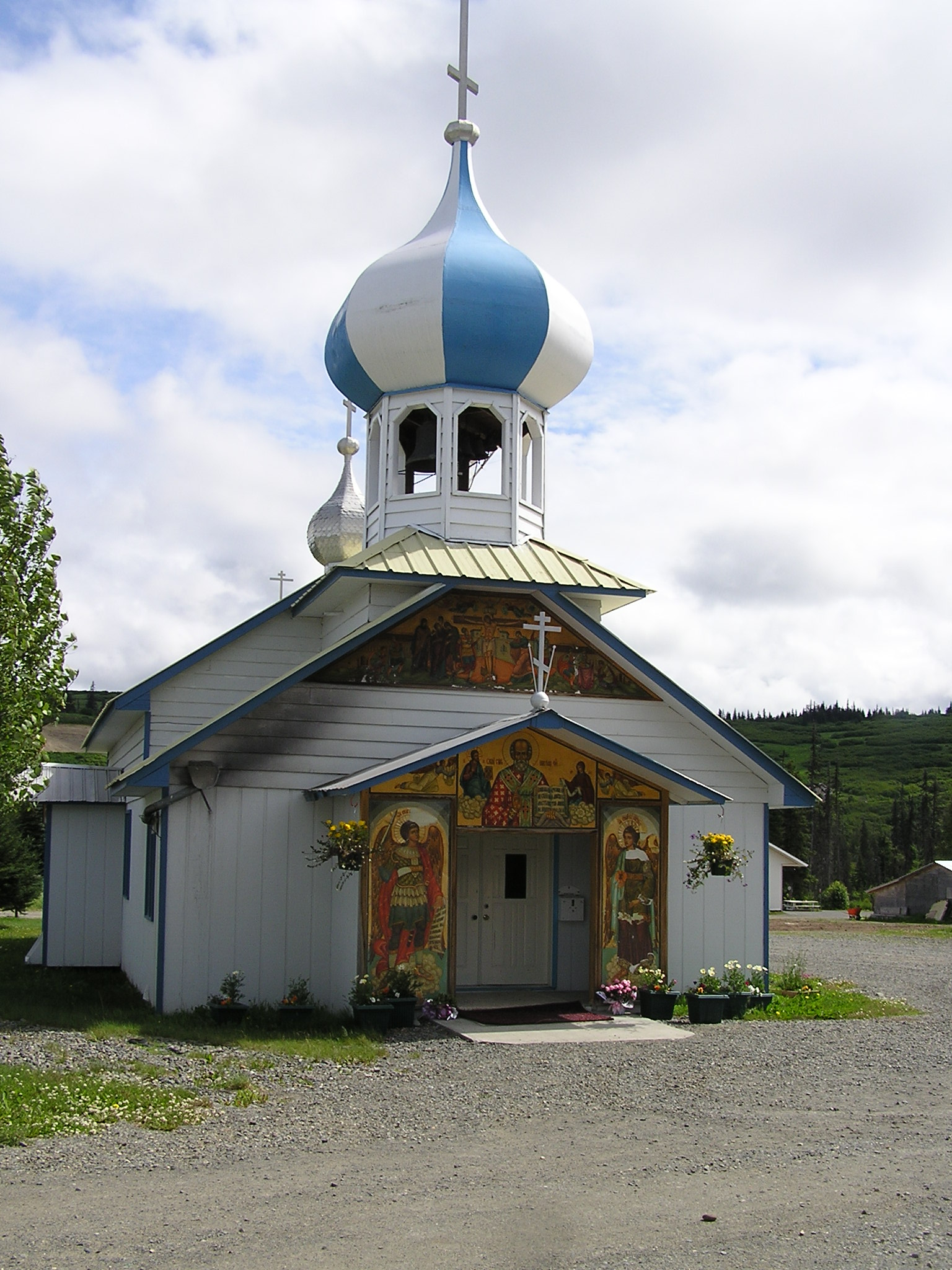
Russian Old Believers Church in Nikolaevsk, Alaska

| Country | Ethnic Russians | % | Year |
|---|---|---|---|
| Ukraine | 8,300,000 | 17.3% | 2001 |
| Kazakhstan | 2,963,938 | 14.6% | 2025 |
| United States | 2,432,733 | 0.6% | 2023 |
| Brazil | 1.8-2 million | | 2025 |
| Germany | 1,213,000 | | 2012 |
| Israel | 891,700 | 14.2% | 2015 |
| Uzbekistan | 720,324 | 2.1% | 2021 |
| Belarus | 706,992 | 7.5% | 2019 |
| Canada | 622,445 | 1.8% | 2016 |
| France | 200,000 to 500,000 | | 2014 |
| Latvia | 434,243 | 23.4% | 2025 |
| Argentina | 400,000 | | 2019 |
| Estonia | 276,125 | 20.2% | 2026 |
| Kyrgyzstan | 282,652 | 4.1% | 2022 |
| Turkey | 240,715 | | 2022 |
| Lithuania | 141,122 | 5.0% | 2021 |
| Transnistria (unrecognized state) | 138,072 | 28.5% | 2015 |
| Italy | 120,000 | | 2006 |
| Spain | 118,801 | | 2023 |
| Turkmenistan | 114,447 | 1.6% | 2022 |
| Finland | 102,487 | 1.8% | 2024 |
| Thailand | 60,000-100,000 | 1.6% | 2024 |
| Moldova (excl. Transnistria) | 75,300 | 3.2% | 2024 |
| United Kingdom | 73,000 | | 2020 |
| Azerbaijan | 71,046 | 0.7% | 2019 |
| South Korea | 70,689 | | 2024 |
| Australia | 67,550 | | |
| United Arab Emirates | 56,600 | | |
| Cuba | 50,200 | | |
| Egypt | 12,000-50,000 | | 2010 |
| Cyprus | 40,583 | | 2025 |
| Venezuela | 34,600 | | |
| Austria | 30,249 | | |
| Tajikistan | 29,000 | 0.3% | 2020 |
| (Georgia (country)) Georgia | 26,586 | 0.7% | 2014 |
| Romania | 23,000 | | |
| Sweden | 20,930 | | |
| Belgium | 20,000 | | 2008 |
| China | 15,600 | | 2000 |
| Bulgaria | 15,595 | | |
| India | 6,000 to 15,000 | | |
| Norway | 13,914 | | |
| Greece | 13,415 | | 2021 |
| Poland | 13,000 | | 2011 |
| Armenia | 11,911 | | 2002 |
| Japan | 11,634 | | |
| New Zealand | 10,235 | | |
| Portugal | 5,103 | | |
| Hong Kong | 5,000 | | |
| Qatar | 5,000 | | |
| Singapore | 4,500 | | |
| Serbia | 3,290 | | 2013 |
| Mexico | 1,600 to 2,000 | | |

=== Albania ===
In Albania, the presence of Russians first occurred at the end of 1921, with thousands of former White Army soldiers settling in the nation at the request of Prime Minister Ahmet Zogu. After the Second World War, hundreds of Soviet civilian and military experts were sent to Albania. The Soviet Union withdrew specialists from the country in 1961, resulting in about half of the Russian diaspora being forced to remain in Albania permanently. The Russian-speaking diaspora today numbers only about 300 people.

=== Americas ===
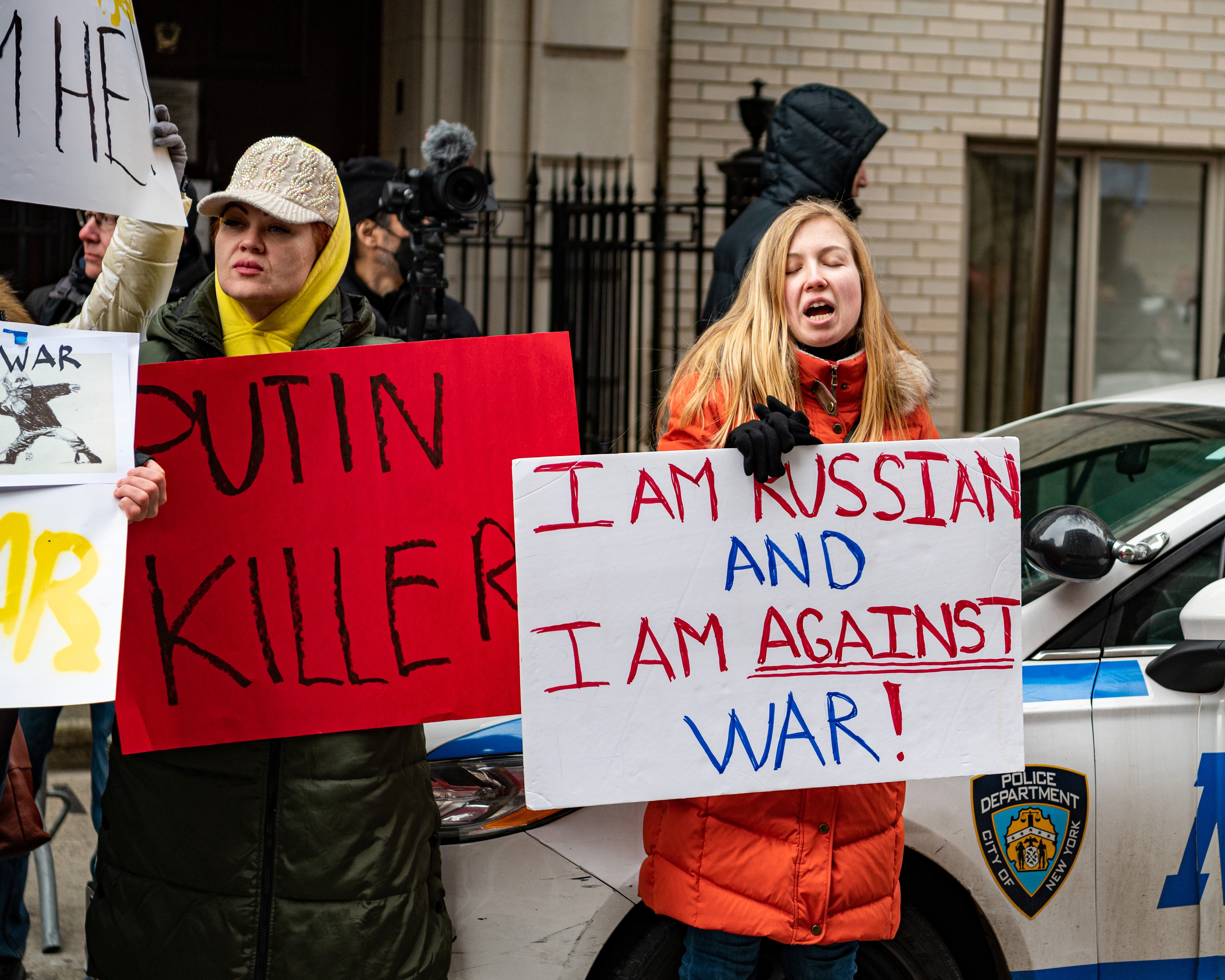
Protest against the Russian invasion of Ukraine outside the Russian Consulate in New York City on 24 February 2022

Russian settlement in Mexico was minimal but well documented in the 19th and the early 20th centuries. A few breakaway sectarians from the Russian Orthodox Church, partial tribes of Spiritual Christian Pryguny arrived in Los Angeles beginning in 1904 to escape persecution from Tsarist Russia and were diverted to purchase and colonize land in the Guadalupe Valley northeast of Ensenada to establish a few villages in which they maintained their Russian culture for a few decades before they were abandoned; cemeteries bearing Cyrillic letters remain.

In the late 1800s, there was a large influx of Jewish immigrants to the United States from Russia and Eastern Europe to escape religious persecution. From the third of the Jewish population that left the area, roughly eighty percent resettled in America. There, many still desired to hold onto their Russian identities and settled in areas with large numbers of Russian immigrants already. Local populations were generally distrustful of their cultural differences.

Dissenters of the official Soviet Communist Party like the Trotskyists and their leader, Leon Trotsky, found refuge in Mexico in the 1930s, where Trotsky himself was assassinated by NKVD agent Ramon Mercader in 1940.

=== East Asia and Southeast Asia ===
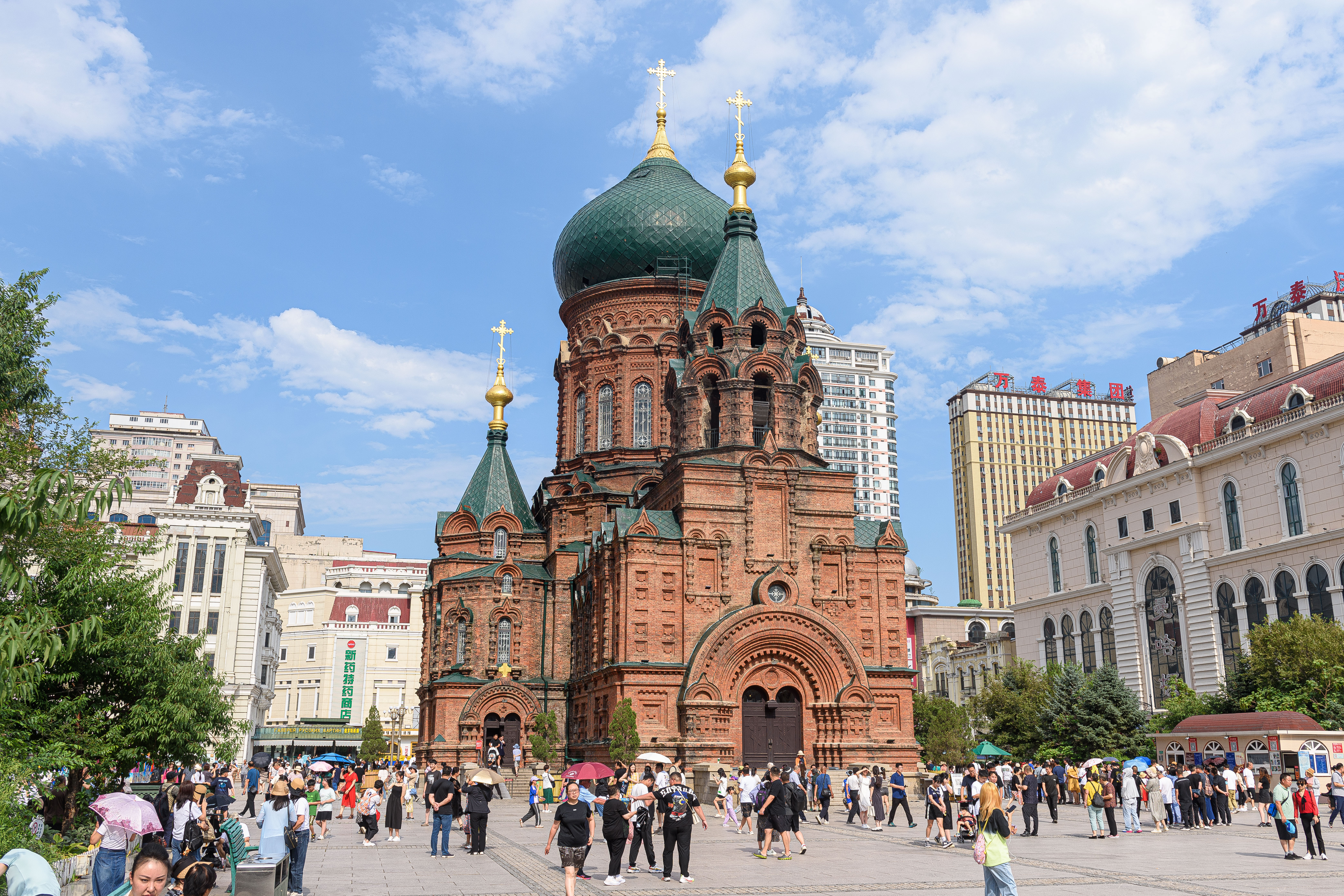
Russian Orthodox Saint Sofia Church in Harbin, China

Russians are one of the 56 ethnic groups officially recognized by the People's Republic of China. They are approximately 15,600 living mostly in northern Xinjiang and also in Inner Mongolia and Heilongjiang. In the 1920s, Harbin was flooded with 100,000 to 200,000 White émigrés fleeing Russia. Some Harbin Russians moved to other cities, including Shanghai, Beijing, and Tianjin. By the 1930s, Shanghai's Russian community had grown to more than 25,000.

There are also smaller numbers of Russians in Japan. The Japanese government disputes Russia's claim to the Kuril Islands, which were annexed by the Soviet Union in 1945 after the Japanese surrender at the end of World War II. The Soviet Red Army expelled all Japanese from the island chain, which was resettled with Russians and other Soviet nationalities.

A few Russians also settled in the Korean Peninsula in the late 19th and the early 20th centuries. There are some number of Russians reside in South Korea, with an estimated population of around 70,000. Approximately half of them are of Korean descent, tracing their heritage to the Koryo-saram, who is ethnic Koreans who settled in the former Soviet Union.

The population of Russians in Singapore is estimated at 4,500 by local Russian embassy in 2018; they are a largely-professional and business-oriented expatriate community, and among them are hundreds of company owners or local heads of branches of large Russian multinationals. President Vladimir Putin visited Singapore on 13 November 2018 to break ground for Russian Cultural Center, which will also house a Russian Orthodox church. During the meeting of State Heads, President Halimah mentioned that there were 690 Russian companies in Singapore

There are about 40 Russian families living in Manila, Philippines.

=== Finland ===
Finland borders Russia directly, and from 1809 until 1917 was a Grand Duchy of Finland in personal union with the Russian Empire. As of 2024, Finland had 35,172 Russian citizens and 102,487 (1.8% of population) speak Russian as their mother tongue.

=== Former USSR ===
Today the largest ethnic Russian diasporas outside of Russia exist in former Soviet states such as Ukraine (about 9 million), Kazakhstan (3,644,529 or 20.61% in 2016), Belarus (about 1.5 million), Uzbekistan (about 650,000) Kyrgyzstan (about 600,000) and Latvia (471,276 or 24.7% in 2020).

The situation faced by ethnic Russian diasporas varied widely. In Belarus, for example, there was no perceivable change in status. But in Estonia and Latvia, people without ancestors that had been a citizen of those countries before the Soviet occupation of 1940–1991, and who did not request Russian citizenship while it was available, were deemed non-citizens.

In March 2022, a week after the start of the Russian invasion of Ukraine, 82% of ethnic Russians living in Ukraine said they did not believe that any part of Ukraine was rightfully part of Russia, according to Lord Ashcroft's polls which did not include the Russian-occupied regions of Crimea and parts of the Donbas. 65% of Ukrainians – including 88% of those of Russian ethnicity – agreed that "despite our differences there is more that unites ethnic Russians living in Ukraine and Ukrainians than divides us."

== See also ==
- Russian emigration during the Russian invasion of Ukraine
- Russian language in post-Soviet states
