= Kyrgyzstan–Russia relations =

- Kyrgyzstan: Russia

Diplomatic mission
- Kyrgyz embassy, Moscow: Russian embassy, Bishkek

Kyrgyzstan–Russia relations are the relations between the two countries, Kyrgyzstan and Russia. Russia has an embassy in Bishkek and a consulate in Osh, and Kyrgyzstan has an embassy in Moscow, a consulate in Ekaterinburg, and a vice-consulate in Novosibirsk.

== History ==
In the 1860s, the former Kara-Kyrgyz Khanate was conquered by Russia, and in 1916, the Kyrgyz people rebelled against Russian rule during the wider Central Asian revolt of 1916.

Russian president Boris Yeltsin made his first international trip to Kyrgyzstan after he was elected president in 1991.

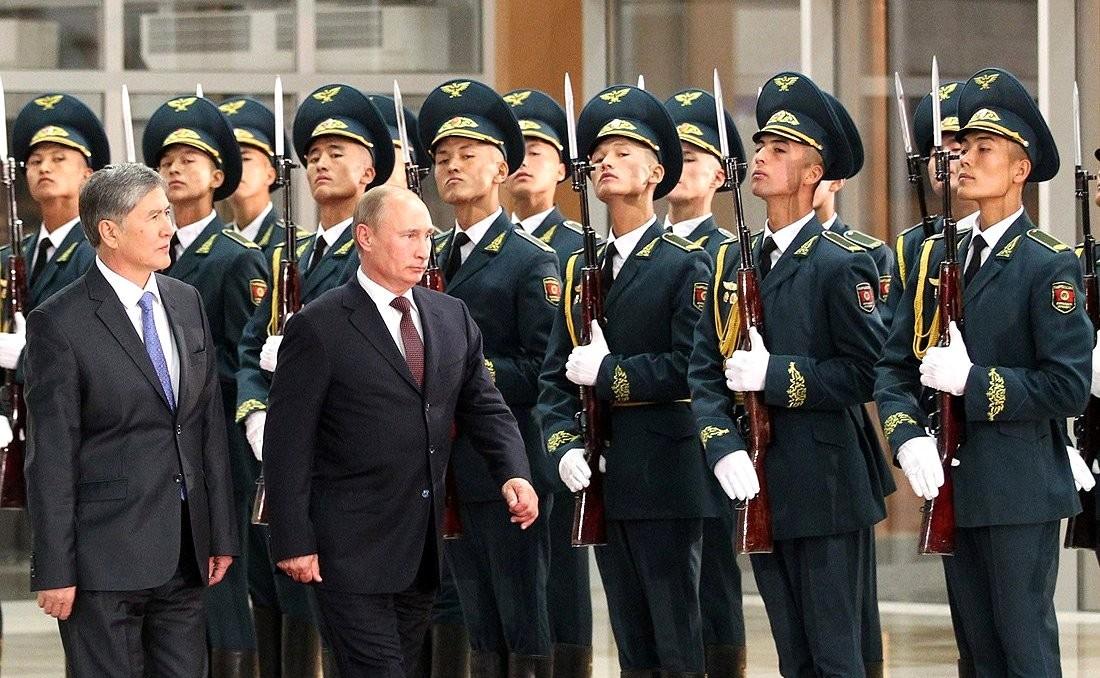
Almazbek Atambayev with Vladimir Putin.

President Askar Akayev was very enthusiastic about more direct forms of reintegration, such as the Eurasian Union that the president of Kazakhstan, Nursultan Nazarbayev, proposed in June 1994. Akayev's invitation for Russian border guards to take charge of Kyrgyzstan's Chinese border, a major revision of his policy of neutrality, was another move toward reintegration.

The Kyrgyzstani government also felt compelled to request Russia's economic protection. Despite concerted efforts to seek international "sponsors," Akayev did not receive much more than international good will.

President Almazbek Atambayev repeatedly presented himself as a pro-Russian politician during his years in office. He announced Kyrgyzstan's entry into the Customs Union, secured the withdrawal of the American 376th Air Expeditionary Wing from the country in 2014, and had spoken of the need for closer economic relations with the Russian Federation.

== Migrant relations ==
For its part, Russia sees aid to Kyrgyzstan as a successful precedent in its new policy of gaining influence in its "near abroad," the states that once were Soviet republics. Russia did not want a massive in-migration of Russians from the new republics; some 2 million ethnic Russians moved back to Russia between 1992 and 1995. Akayev, on the other hand, sought a way to stem the loss of his Russian population, which already had caused an enormous deficit of doctors, teachers, and engineers. However, according to census data, the number of ethnic Russians in the country in 2020 is about a third of what it was in 1989.

In 2023, Kyrgyzstan agreed to share the personal data of exiled anti-war Russians with the Russian government. In June 2023, Kyrgyzstan deported Russian anti-war activist Alexei Rozhkov to Russia.

As of 1 February 2025, Kyrgyzstan faced a significant labor shortage, with 6,305 job vacancies, predominantly for blue-collar workers. The official unemployment rate stood at 1.8%, while approximately 69,300 people sought assistance from the employment service. Many Kyrgyz citizens have worked in Russia over the past three decades, but in recent years, return migration has increased due to Russia's economic downturn, stricter regulations, and rising anti-immigrant sentiment. In response, Kyrgyzstan has focused on creating new industrial enterprises to accommodate returning migrants.

== Ethnic policy ==
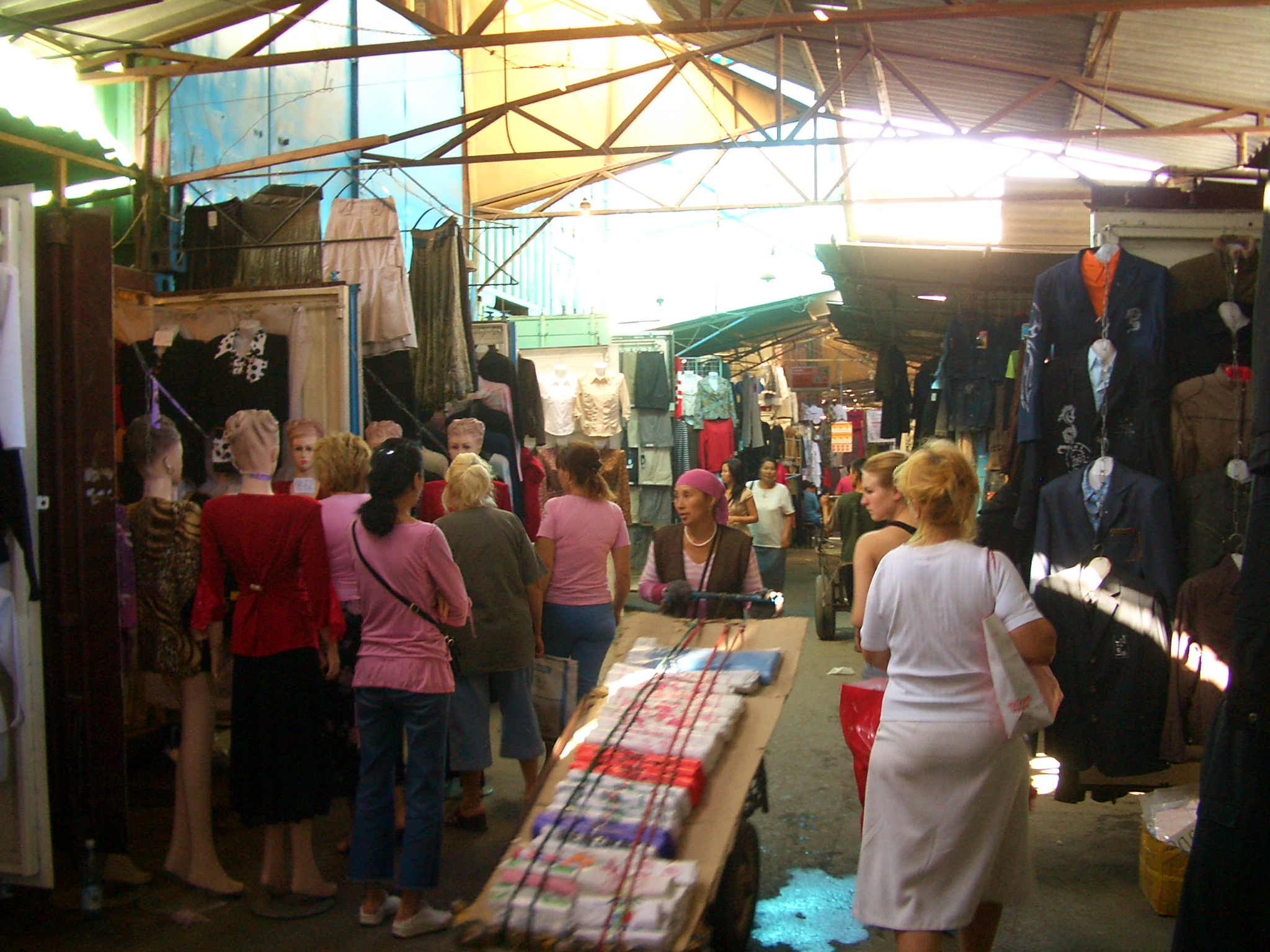
Bishkek's gigantic Dordoy Bazaar, served by special shuttle buses from Siberia, is as an important center for supplying Chinese consumer goods to the Russian market

For these reasons, despite opposition from Kyrgyz nationalists and other independence-minded politicians, in 1995 Akayev granted the request of Russian president Boris Yeltsin to review the constitutional provision making Kyrgyz the sole official language. In the current constitution, Russian is listed as an "official language" whereas Kyrgyz is the state language.

=== Cross-cultural institutions ===
- Kyrgyz-Russian Slavic University

== Economic cooperation ==
For all the financial support that the world has offered, Kyrgyzstan remains economically dependent on Russia, both directly and through Kazakhstan. During his February 1994 visit to Moscow, Akayev signed several economic agreements. Having promised the republic a 75 billion ruble line of credit (presumably for use in 1994) and some US$65 million in trade agreements, Russia also promised to extend to Kyrgyzstan most favoured nation status for the purchase of oil and other fuels. For its part, Kyrgyzstan agreed to the creation of a Kyrgyz-Russian investment company, which would purchase idle defence-related factories in the republic to provide employment for the increasingly dissatisfied Russian population of Kyrgyzstan.

In early 1995, Prime Minister Apas Jumagulov of Kyrgyzstan and Prime Minister Viktor Chernomyrdin of Russia signed a series of agreements establishing bilateral coordination of economic reform in the two states, further binding Kyrgyzstan to Russia. After lobbying hard for inclusion, Kyrgyzstan became a member of the customs union that Russia, Belarus, and Kazakhstan established in February 1996. In early 1995, Askar Akayev, the then President of Kyrgyzstan, attempted to sell Russian companies controlling shares in the republic's twenty-nine largest industrial plants, an offer that Russia refused.

Both Kyrgyzstan and Russia are members of the Eurasian Economic Union. In February 2009 the Russian government pledged to write off Kyrgyzstan's $180 million debt as well as promising to lend a further $2 billion, give $150 million in direct aid and subsidise the building of the Kambarata-1 hydropower plant at the Kambaratinsk Dam. In March 2019, the Russian government announced that it would give a $30 million (USD) in economic and military aid to Kyrgyzstan.

Within the framework of the project "Emergency response to the consequences of COVID-19", Russia transferred 107 units of vehicles to health organizations and Centers for Disease Prevention and State sanitary and Epidemiological Supervision of the Kyrgyz Republic for a total amount of 3 million US dollars: 47 units of ambulances, 35 units of sanitary transport with sedan body type, 19 units of sanitary transport with type the body of a minivan, 4 units of specialized transport for transporting the bodies of the dead, 2 units of disinfection machines.

== Military cooperation ==
Since 2003, Russian Air Force units have been stationed at Kant Air Base east of Bishkek. On 20 September 2012, Russia and Kyrgyzstan signed an agreement in which Russia is allowed to have a joint military base in Kyrgyzstan for 15 years starting from 2017. The agreement was signed in Bishkek between Vladimir Putin and Almazbek Atambayev. Putin stated that the joint military base will be a significant factor adding to the stability in the country and the whole region. Russia and Kyrgyzstan also have signed an inter-governmental agreement on cooperation in the military-technical sphere, by which Russia ships $1 billion worth of weapons to the country, including S-300 missile systems and strike drones.

== Gallery ==
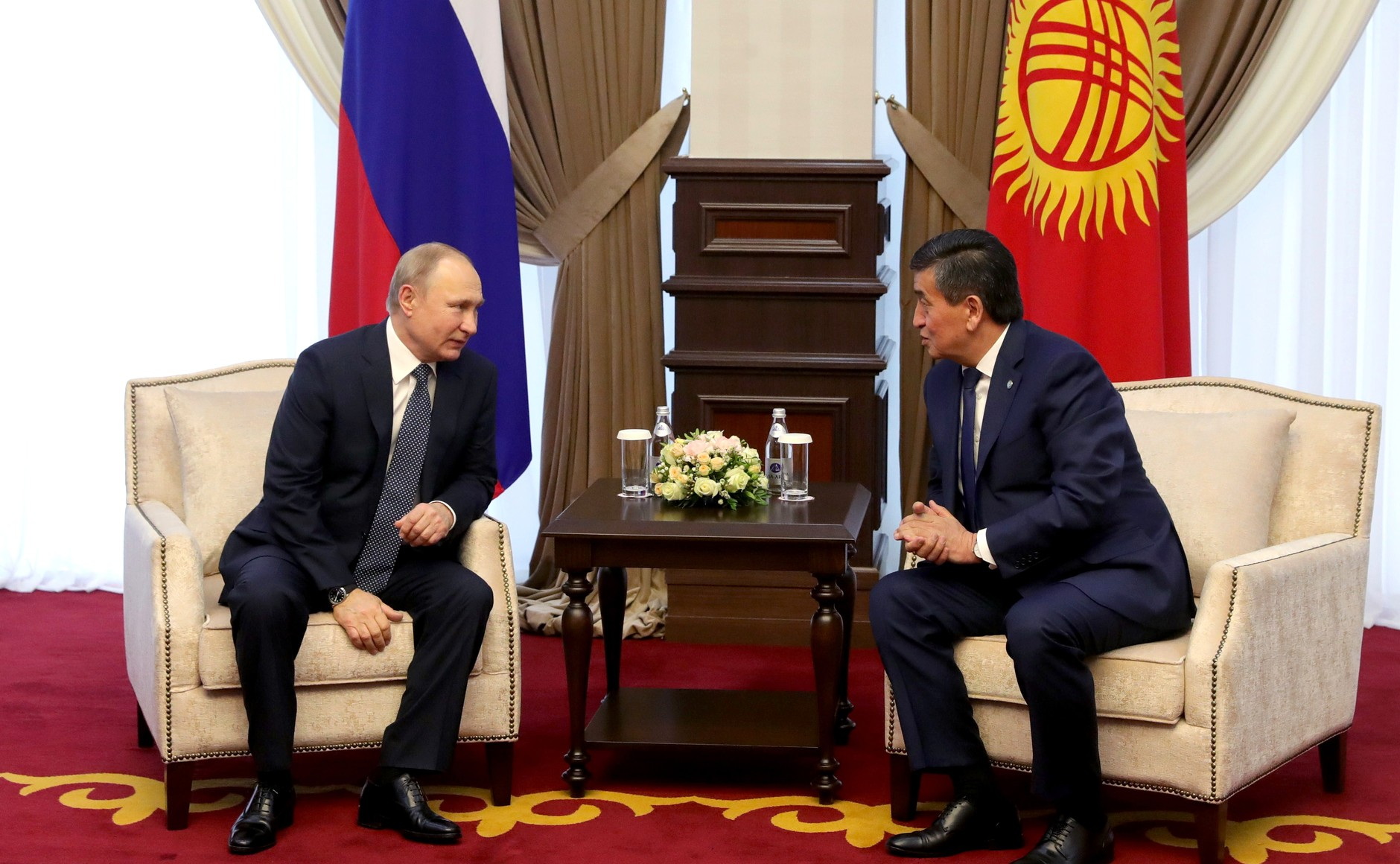
Vladimir Putin and Sooronbay Jeenbekov.

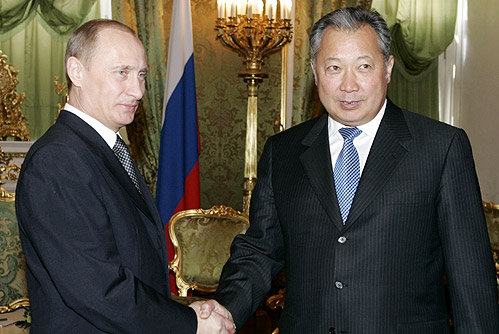
Russian president Vladimir Putin and former Kyrgyz president Kurmanbek Bakiyev.

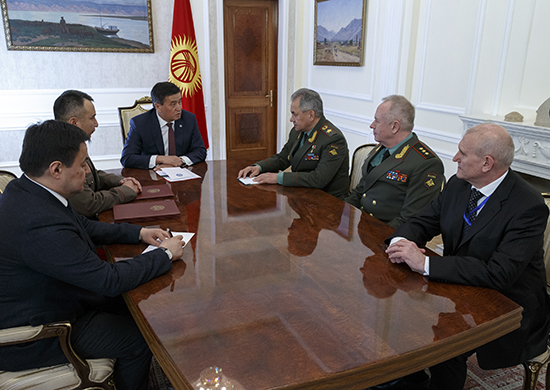
Russian defence minister Sergey Shoygu during a meeting with President Sooronbay Jeenbekov and Major General Rayimberdi Duishenbiev in Bishkek, April 2019.

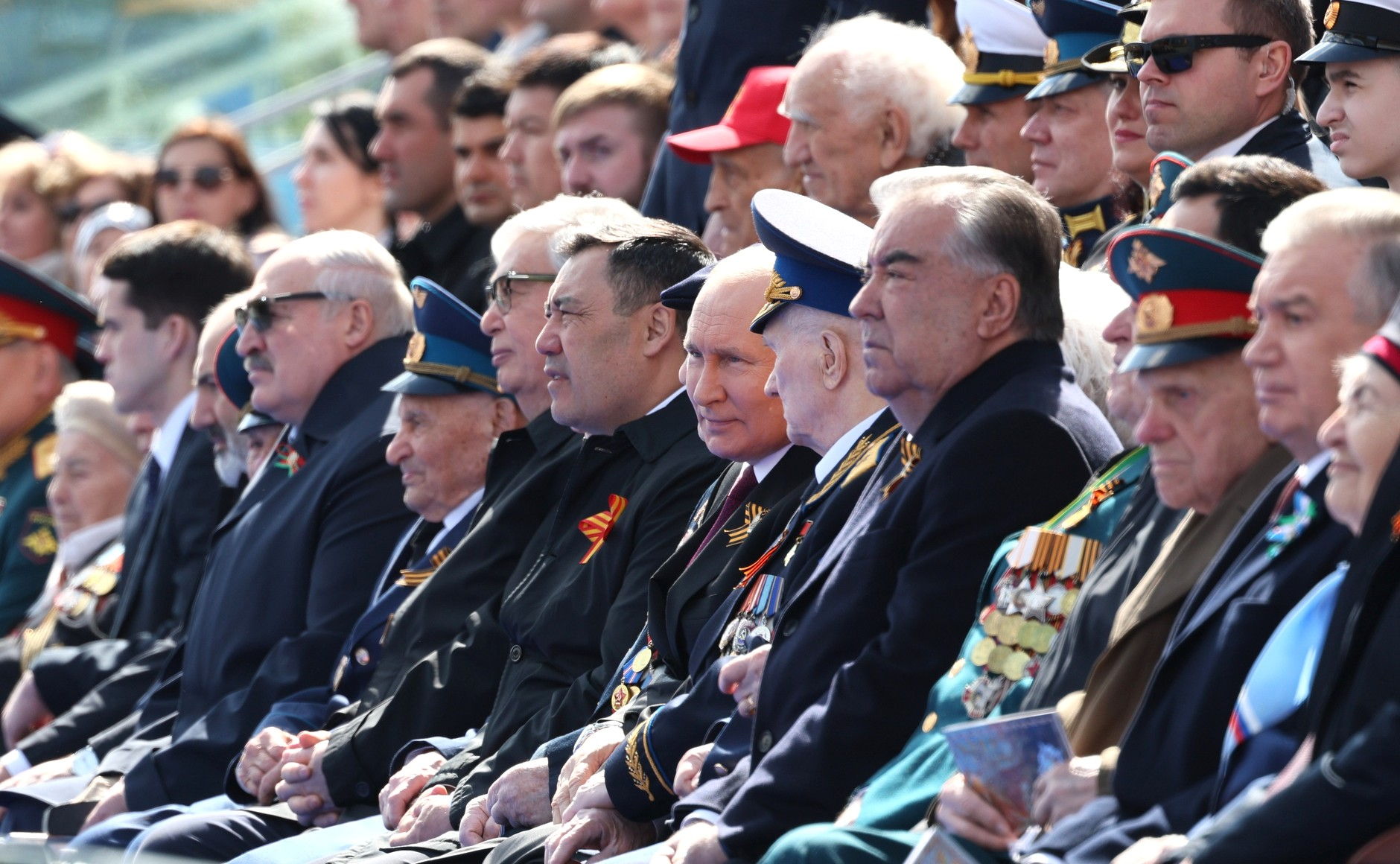
Kyrgyz president Sadyr Japarov with Russian president Putin and other post-Soviet leaders at the 2023 Moscow Victory Day Parade

== See also ==
- Foreign relations of Kyrgyzstan
- Foreign relations of Russia
- Kyrgyz in Russia
- Russians in Kyrgyzstan
- List of ambassadors of Russia to Kyrgyzstan
