= Uzbeks in Russia =

Ethnic group in Russia

Total population
- 300.000

Regions with significant populations
- Moscow: 35,595-around2mil,Unknown

Languages
- Uzbek · Russian

Religion
- Predominately Sunni Muslim

Related ethnic groups
- Other Turkic peoples

Uzbeks represent a significant diaspora in the Russian Federation, numbering 300,000 as of January 2016. Most Uzbeks living in Russia are seasonal migrant workers. Most have arrived after the dissolution of the Soviet Union. Due to cultural differences, they are one of the most discriminated-against minorities in Russia, and hence rarely settle outside of the Russian capital, Moscow.

== Population ==
There has been dispute on the actual population of Uzbeks in Russia, with estimates varying from 300,000 (Russian census 2010) to over two million. There has been a decline in numbers since 2015 due to the Russian recession, as most migrants cannot find jobs with a decent salary, and because of that choose to work in other countries such as South Korea. Majority of them live in the Russian capital Moscow and some live in other major cities such as Saint Petersburg.

== Religion ==
Most Uzbek labour migrants are Sunni Muslims, with some long-term workers converting to Eastern Orthodoxy through missionaries.

== Discrimination ==
Racism in the Russian media, such as in this 2014 news article, has exacerbated racism against Uzbeks. Because of this, Uzbek migrants (along with Kyrgyz, Azeris and Tajiks) face violence, discrimination, xenophobia and humiliation. In 2013, there were riots against Uzbeks by ethnic Russians in many Russian cities. Racially motivated murders of Uzbeks have occurred. In order to make life easier for Uzbek migrants, Russian authorities have put Uzbek translations in some places. While racial violence against Uzbeks has drastically decreased in recent years, Uzbeks have faced difficulties as migrant laborers due to the COVID-19 pandemic, and many have been stuck in facilities for migrants.

While racism against Kazakhs and Azeris has been very diminished, Uzbeks still face discrimination. In general, among Central Asians and Caucasians, Armenians, Azeris, Georgians, Kazakhs, and Turkmen are seen in a positive light, while Uzbeks, Tajiks, and Kyrgyz people are seen negatively.

== See also ==
- Russia–Uzbekistan relations
- Uzbeks
- Immigration to Russia
- Russians in Uzbekistan
