= St. Nicholas Cathedral (Dushanbe) =

Coordinates: 38°33′59.3″N 68°49′0.3″E

St. Nicholas Cathedral Свято-Николаевский собор
- St. Nicholas Cathedral

- Location within Tajikistan

Religion
- Affiliation: Russian Orthodox Church

Location
- Location: Dushanbe, Tajikistan

Architecture
- Completed: 1943

St. Nicholas Cathedral (Russian: Свято-Николаевский собор, romanized: Svyato-Nikolayevskiy sobor) is a Russian Orthodox church in Dushanbe, Tajikistan. It is the Cathedral church of the Russian Orthodox Eparchy of Dushanbe and Tajikistan.

== History ==
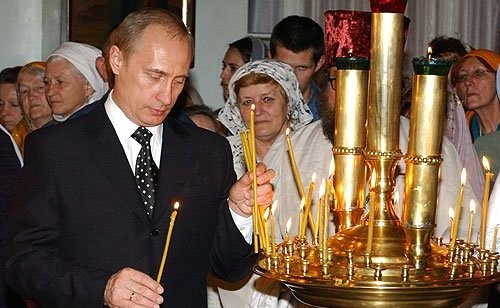
Vladimir Putin in the cathedral

The cathedral was completed at the end of 1943 due to a certain softening that occurred in the USSR in relation to the Patriarchal Church that year.

After the collapse of the USSR, a large number of Orthodox families left the country, leaving the cathedral with no visitors. In the spring of 2005, the St. Nicholas Cathedral began its first major reconstruction, which continued until 2011. As of 2019 the Cathedral was dependent on donations from the local community to support itself.

== See also ==
- Russians in Tajikistan
- Christianity in Tajikistan
- Dushanbe
