= Ethnic Russians in post-Soviet states =

Ethnic Russians living in former Soviet states

After the dissolution of the Soviet Union (USSR) in December 1991, about 25 million ethnic Russians in post-Soviet states found themselves living outside of Russia. However, this number declined to less than 6 million today, excluding Ukraine in which ethnic Russian population is hard to estimate due to lack of a recent census.

All former Soviet citizens had a time window within which they could transfer their former Soviet citizenship to Russian citizenship. Where they did not exercise that choice, their resulting citizenship status outside Russia varied by state: from no perceivable change in status – as in Belarus – to becoming permanently resident "non-citizens" – as in Estonia and Latvia, which restricted citizenship to their pre-World War II citizens and their offspring (regardless of ethnic group) upon restoration of their independence in continuity with their sovereign identities prior to June 1940.

In June 2006 Russian President Vladimir Putin announced a plan to introduce national policy aiming at encouraging ethnic Russian immigration to Russia.

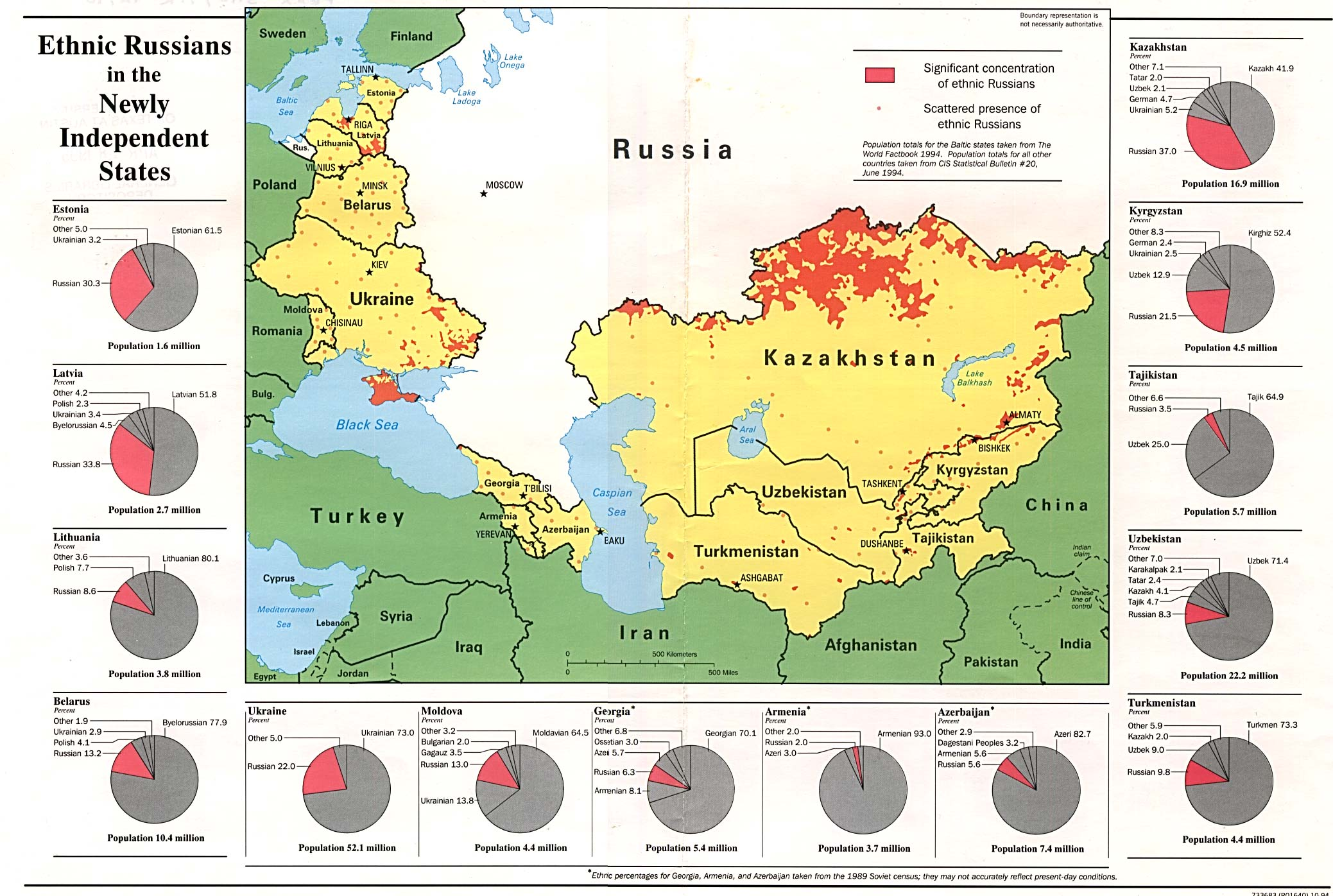
Ethnic Russians in post-Soviet states (1994)

Country	Number of ethnic Russians	Percent of national population	As of (census data)
Russia^{1}	105,579,179	80.8	2021
Ukraine	8,334,141	17.3	2001
Kazakhstan	2,943,022	14.4	2026
Belarus	706,992	7.5	2019
Uzbekistan	606,526	1.6	2026
Latvia^{1}	426,408	23.1	2026
Estonia^{1}	276,125	20.4	2026
Kyrgyzstan	270,200	3.7	2026
Lithuania	141,500	4.9	2026
Turkmenistan	114,447	1.6	2022
Moldova^{2}	75,300	3.2	2024
Azerbaijan	71,046	0.7	2019
Georgia^{3}	42,545	1.1	2024
Tajikistan	29,000	0.3	2020
Armenia	14,074	0.5	2022

^{1}: Excluding the population for which data is unknown

^{2}: Does not include Transnistria (2015 census: 138,072 Russians or 29.1% of the population)

^{3}: Does not include Abkhazia (2024 estimate: 22,224 Russians or 9.1% of the population) or South Ossetia (2015 census: 610 Russians or 1.1% of the population)

== See also ==
- Russians in Armenia
- Russians in Azerbaijan
- Russians in Belarus
- Russians in Estonia
- Russians in Georgia
- Russians in Kazakhstan
- Russians in Kyrgyzstan
- Russians in Latvia
- Russians in Lithuania
- Russians in Moldova
- Russians in Tajikistan
- Russians in Turkmenistan
- Russians in Ukraine
- Russians in Uzbekistan
