= Russians in Spain =

Rusos en España

Total population
- 141.438 (2025)

Languages
- Russian and Spanish

Religion
- Russian Orthodox Church; Judaism

Related ethnic groups
- Russian diaspora

Russians in Spain at 2025 there are 141.438 russians living in Spain.

== History ==
During the Spanish Civil War there were 72 White émigré volunteers on the Nationalist side, as well as some hundreds of Soviet advisors on the Republican side.

== Foreign population of Russian citizenship in Spain ==
Vertical bar chart of foreign population of Russian nationality in Spain between 1998 and 2017
Population (1998-2017) Foreign population in Spain of Russian nationality according to the Instituto Nacional de Estadística.
