= Russians in Georgia =

Ethnic group in Georgia

Russians in Georgia (2002): > 5% 3-5% 2-3% 1-2% 0.5-1% < 0.5%

There is a small Russian population in Georgia, making up to 0.7% of the total population in 2014, but rising to more than 3% by the end of 2022, and declining by 31,000 persons in 2023. For many years, Georgia was a part of the Russian Empire, and later the Soviet Union. As the two countries share a border, many Russians settled in various regions of Georgia. In 2022, thousands of Russians fled to Georgia, especially Russian men of fighting age, in order to escape mobilization in the ongoing Russian invasion of Ukraine.

During the Soviet period, most Russians were urban dwellers and made up a disproportionately high percentage of the urban population. In 1959, there were more than 125,000 Russians in Tbilisi alone (18.1%). In addition to that, Russians made up 36.8% of the population in Sokhumi (making them the largest ethnic group there at the time), 31.6% in Rustavi, 26.8% in Poti and 25.6% in Batumi. There was also a sizable rural Russian community in Ninotsminda, consisting mainly of members of the Doukhobor religious group. In many places, Russian served as the lingua franca, as is served as the language of interethnic communication with Georgia's many other minorities. With the collapse of the Soviet Union, Russian was not only abolished as the country's de facto official language, Georgia also faced several wars, economic hardship and ethnic tensions arose. This led to a strong emigration of Russians from Georgia, with their number decreasing from 341,172 in 1989 to 67,671 in 2002 and further declining to only 26,453 in 2014.

== History ==
Ethnic Russians appeared in Georgia in significant numbers after Georgia became part of the Russian Empire in 1803 (Kartli and Kakheti) - 1878 (Ajara).

Census data shows that the Russian population had risen from 83 to the high-point of 407,886 between 1926 and 1959 and then began to decline slowly to 341,172 in 1989. Almost all Russians left Georgia during the 1990s due to economic hardships, ethnic tensions and other reasons decreasing percent of Russian population in Georgia from 6.3% in 1989 to 0.5% in 2014.

=== 2022 Russian invasion of Ukraine ===
Following the 2022 Russian invasion of Ukraine, an estimated 100,000 Russian citizens and residents are estimated to have left Russia by mid-March 2022 as economic migrants.

In September 2022 alone 222,274 people entered Georgia from Russia, according to the Georgian Ministry of Internal Affairs.

The arrival of Russians made real estate prices skyrocket in Tbilisi; in November 2022, average real estate prices were 210% higher than 1 year prior. This has rendered rent unaffordable for Georgian locals, exacerbating pre-existing tensions between Russians and Georgians. Rental prices also rose substantially; and overall Georgian GDP in the first year after the war rose by approximately ten percent, with two percentage points of that directly attributable to the Russian influx.

In October 2022, protests were held demanding the introduction of a visa regime with Russia in order to mitigate the economic damage caused by the migration, with the ruling Georgian Dream party dismissing such a step as "irrational".

By early 2024, the peak number of Russians who had moved to Georgia since the beginning of the war had declined by approximately one-third, from a peak of 110,000 at the end of 2022. Most departing Georgia are moving to another country with some returning to Russia.

=== Abkhazia ===
Russians made up 2% of the 100,000 population of Abkhazia by 1897. Russian population rose between 1926 and 1970 and declined thereafter. The post-independence decline was particularly steep due to the War in Abkhazia.

== See also ==
- Georgians in Russia
- Russian emigration following the Russian invasion of Ukraine
- Demographics of Georgia
- Russian diaspora
- Georgia–Russia relations
- Russians in post-Soviet states
