= Russians in Moldova =

Ethnic group in Moldova

Total population
- 75,300 (2024 census, 3.24% of total population; excluding Transnistria)

Languages
- Russian, Romanian

Related ethnic groups
- ethnic Russians in post-Soviet states

Russians in Moldova make up to more than 3% of the population of the country (excluding Transnistria) according to the 2024 Moldovan census.

The Russian and Ukrainian-dominated region of Transnistria broke away from government control in 1990.

Self-identification	2024 Moldovan census	% Core Moldova	2015 Transnistrian census	% Transnistria
Russians	75,300	3.24%	138,072	29.1%

The Russophone population is even larger, considering that many ethnic Ukrainians, Gagauz, and Bulgarians have Russian as a first language. 11.1% of the population stated Russian as their mother language in 2024 census.

Russian citizens settled in Moldova, which was then called "Bessarabia," after the Russian Empire incorporated Bessarabia in 1812. Moldavians under Russian rule enjoyed privileges well, the language of Moldavians was established as an official language in the governmental institutions of Bessarabia, used along with Russian. The publishing works established by Archbishop Gavril Bănulescu-Bodoni were able to produce books and liturgical works in Moldavian between 1815 and 1820, until the period from 1871 to 1905, when Russification policies were implemented that phased out the public use of Romanian and replaced it with Russian. Romanian continued to be used as the colloquial language of home and family, and was mostly spoken by ethnic Romanians as a first or second language. Many Romanians changed their family names to Russian-sounding names. This was the era of the highest degree of assimilation in the Russian Empire.

In 1918, control of Bessarabia was transferred from the Russian Empire to the Kingdom of Romania. An official policy of Romanianization of ethnic minorities followed, and was mostly directed at the region's Russians. In 1940, Bessarabia was claimed by Soviet Union, and Russia again gained power over Bessarabia, with the Russians declaring Bessarabia was part of Moldova and Ukraine. Some of the "Russians" who were Romanianized were actually descendants of Romanians who had been "Russified" under long defunct ethnic laws, and many of them still spoke Romanian as a first or second language. They found it easy to adhere to Romanianization laws.

After the Soviet occupation of Bessarabia in 1940, Romanians again fell under the colonial power of Russia. The Romanian population of Bessarabia was persecuted by Soviet authorities on ethnic grounds, especially in the years following the annexation, based mostly on social, educational, and political grounds. Because of this, Russification laws were imposed again on the Romanian population. Among "Romanians" living here were descendants of Ukrainians and Russians who underwent Romanianization policies in the past.

Today, Russian has the status of a "language of interethnic communication", and since Soviet times remains widely used throughout the society and the government. According to the above-mentioned National Political Conception, Russian-Romanian bilingualism is defining national characteristic of Moldova.

Russian was granted official status in Gagauzia, a region in the south of the country inhabited mostly by ethnic Gagauz, and in the breakaway region of Transnistria in the east of the country.

380,796 people (11.25%) identify Russian as their native language, and some 540,990 (16%) speak it as first language in daily use, including 130,000 ethnic Moldovans. It is the first language for 93.2% of ethnic Russians, and a primary language for 4.9% of Moldovans, 50.0% of Ukrainians, 27.4% of Gagauz, 35.4% of Bulgarians, and 54.1% of other ethnic minorities.

In light of the Russian invasion of Ukraine, and outrage over suspected Russians vandalizing a graveyard for Romanian World War II soldiers, the government of Moldova banned the symbols V and Z in April 2022. Pro-Russian parties in Moldova protested the ban on the nationalist symbols, accusing the Moldovan government of erasing their history.

== See also ==
- Demographics of Moldova
- Demographic history of Transnistria
- Moldovans in Russia
- Ethnic Russians in post-Soviet states
- Russian diaspora
- Russians in post-Soviet states
- Moldova–Russia relations
- Ukrainians in Moldova
