= Russians in Kyrgyzstan =

Total population
- 272,812

Regions with significant populations
- Bishkek; Osh; Naryn; Manas

Languages
- Russian; Kyrgyz

Religion
- Russian Orthodoxy; Other

Russians in Kyrgyzstan form a minority ethnic group numbering 272,812 individuals according to official 2025 estimate, representing 3.7% of the total population. Most ethnic Russians migrated to the country during the 20th century. The Russian population has been declining since the 1991breakup of the Soviet Union due to low fertility-rates and to emigration.

The ethnic Russian population lives primarily in the north, especially in the capital city of Bishkek, although some settlements in the north of the country have an ethnic Russian majority.

Most ethnic Russians in Kyrgyzstan are either non-religious or Russian Orthodox, with a small proportion of Old Believers (an anti-reformist group that split from the Russian Orthodox church during the 17th century).

== Notable people ==
=== Politics ===
- Nikolai Tanayev, 8th Prime Minister of Kyrgyzstan
- Igor Chudinov
- Artem Novikov

=== Sports ===
- Valentina Shevchenko
- Antonina Shevchenko
- Yevgeny Petrashov
- Igor Paklin

== See also ==
- Kyrgyzstan–Russia relations
- Ethnic Russians in post-Soviet states
- Russian diaspora
- Demographics of Kyrgyzstan
