= Russians in Tajikistan =

Minority ethnic group living in Tajikistan

St. Nicholas Cathedral in Dushanbe, a church of the Russian Orthodox Eparchy of Dushanbe and Tajikistan

The history of Russians in Tajikistan goes back to the days of the Russian Empire through the Soviet era to the present. The region was part of the Soviet Union, initially as the Tajik Autonomous Soviet Socialist Republic in 1924 and then as the Tajik Soviet Socialist Republic from 1929 to 1991. Russians constituted 14.7% of the population in 1959, but that percent declined to 0.3% (about 29,000 people) as of the 2020 census after the 1991 dissolution of the Soviet Union resulted in Tajikistan's independence.

== History ==
The Russian Empire conquered Central Asia, which includes what is now Tajikstan. However, it was considered a backwater, and few Russians emigrated there.

After the fall of Imperial Russia during World War I, the region came under the control of the Soviet Union, and more Russians came. Russification followed, with Russians being favored over Tajiks. The Russian language remains widely used on many levels of society.

The Russian population in Tajikistan rose from an estimated 5600 in 1926 to 159,000 in 1939. By 1959, they made up 14.7% of the population. The 1989 Soviet census reported that 7.6% of the population was ethnic Russian. Tajikistan's independence following the fall of the Soviet Union in 1991 and the outbreak of the Tajikistani Civil War (1992–1997) caused many Russians to leave. Census estimates reported their numbers declining from over 68,000 in 2000 to less than 35,000 in 2010. However, after the start of the Russo-Ukrainian war in 2022, many Russian men fled to Tajikistan to avoid conscription.

== Religion ==
The Russian Orthodox Church has been a presence in Central Asia for over 140 years (as of 2012), with parishes in the Tajik cities of Kurgan Tyube, Tursunzade, Khudzhand and Chkalovsk, and a cathedral, St. Nicholas Cathedral, in the capital, Dushanbe.

== Notable Russians in Tajikistan ==
=== Political figures ===
- Yuri Ponosov, First Deputy Prime Minister of Tajikistan from 1996 to 1998
- Alexander Shishlyannikov, the first Minister of Defence of Tajikistan
- Georgy Koshlakov, head of the Department of Economics and Management at the Russian-Tajik Slavonic University

=== Sportspeople ===
- Vladislava Ovcharenko
- Kristina Pronzhenko
- Andrei Drygin
- Yuri Lobanov
- Sergey Zabavsky
- Katerina Izmailova
- Sergey Babikov
- Lidiya Karamchakova
- Natalia Ivanova
- Galina Mityaeva
- Anastasiya Tyurina

== See also ==
- Russia–Tajikistan relations
- Christianity in Tajikistan
- Demographics of Tajikistan
- Russians in post-Soviet States
- Dushanbe
