= Russians in Uzbekistan =

Ethnic group

Total population
- 606,526 (2026 census)

Languages
- Russian, Uzbek

Religion
- Russian Orthodox Church

Russians in Uzbekistan comprised the country's second-largest ethnic group after Uzbeks, numbering 606,526 in 2026, representing 1.6% of the population. Prior to the fall of the Soviet Union, there were 1,653,475 Russians living in Uzbekistan (1989). During the Soviet period, Russians constituted more than half the population of the capital city, Tashkent.

After the dissolution of the Soviet Union, significant emigration of ethnic Russians took place, mostly for economic reasons. Russians are concentrated in Tashkent, Bukhara and other major cities. The main religion is Russian Orthodoxy. Since 2014, 200,000 people have left to live in Russia, many citing discrimination and poor job opportunities.

Several Russians fled to Uzbekistan to avoid the 2022 Russian mobilization.

== See also ==
- Russia–Uzbekistan relations
- Demographics of Uzbekistan
- Russians in post-Soviet States
- Uzbeks in Russia
