= Russians in Belarus =

Ethnic group in Belarus

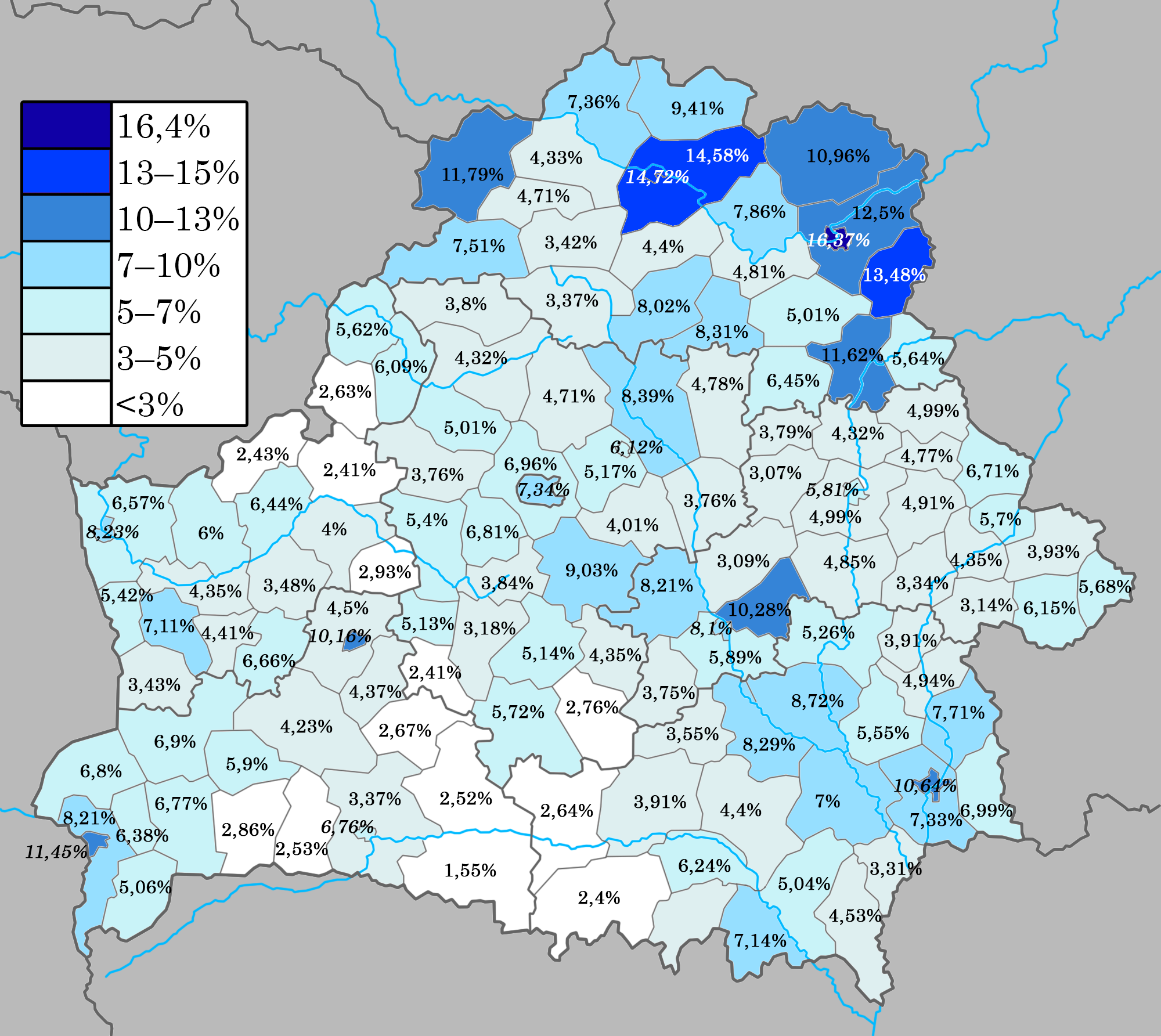
Russians in Belarus according to 2019 census

According to the 2019 census, there are 706,992 ethnic Russians in Belarus (Russian: Русские в Белоруссии, romanized: Russkie v Belorussii; Belarusian: Рускія ў Беларусі, romanized: Ruskija w Biełarusi), which accounts for approximately 7.5 percent of the population of Belarus. Ten years earlier, there were 785,084 ethnic Russians in Belarus, meaning that the Russian population in Belarus decreased 10 percent between 2009 and 2019, while the total population of Belarus decreased by 1 percent in the same period. Russians constitute the largest ethnic minority group in the country.

== See also ==
- Belarus–Russia relations
- Ethnic Russians in post-Soviet states
- Belarusians in Russia
- Union State
