= Russians in Turkmenistan =

Ethnic group in Turkmenistan

Total population
- 114,447

Regions with significant populations
- Ashgabad; Dashoguz; Balkanabad; Turkmenabad

Languages
- Russian; Turkmen

Religion
- Russian Orthodoxy; Atheism; Islam

Russians in Turkmenistan are a minority ethnic group, numbering 114,447 as of 2022 census representing 1.62% of the population. Most ethnic Russians migrated to Turkmenistan during the 20th century. Many settlements were founded in the north of the country. The Russian population reached its peak just before the breakup of the Soviet Union. Most ethnic Russians live in the capital city of Turkmenistan, Ashgabat. Significant populations are found in other major cities. The main religion of Russians in Turkmenistan is Russian Orthodoxy.

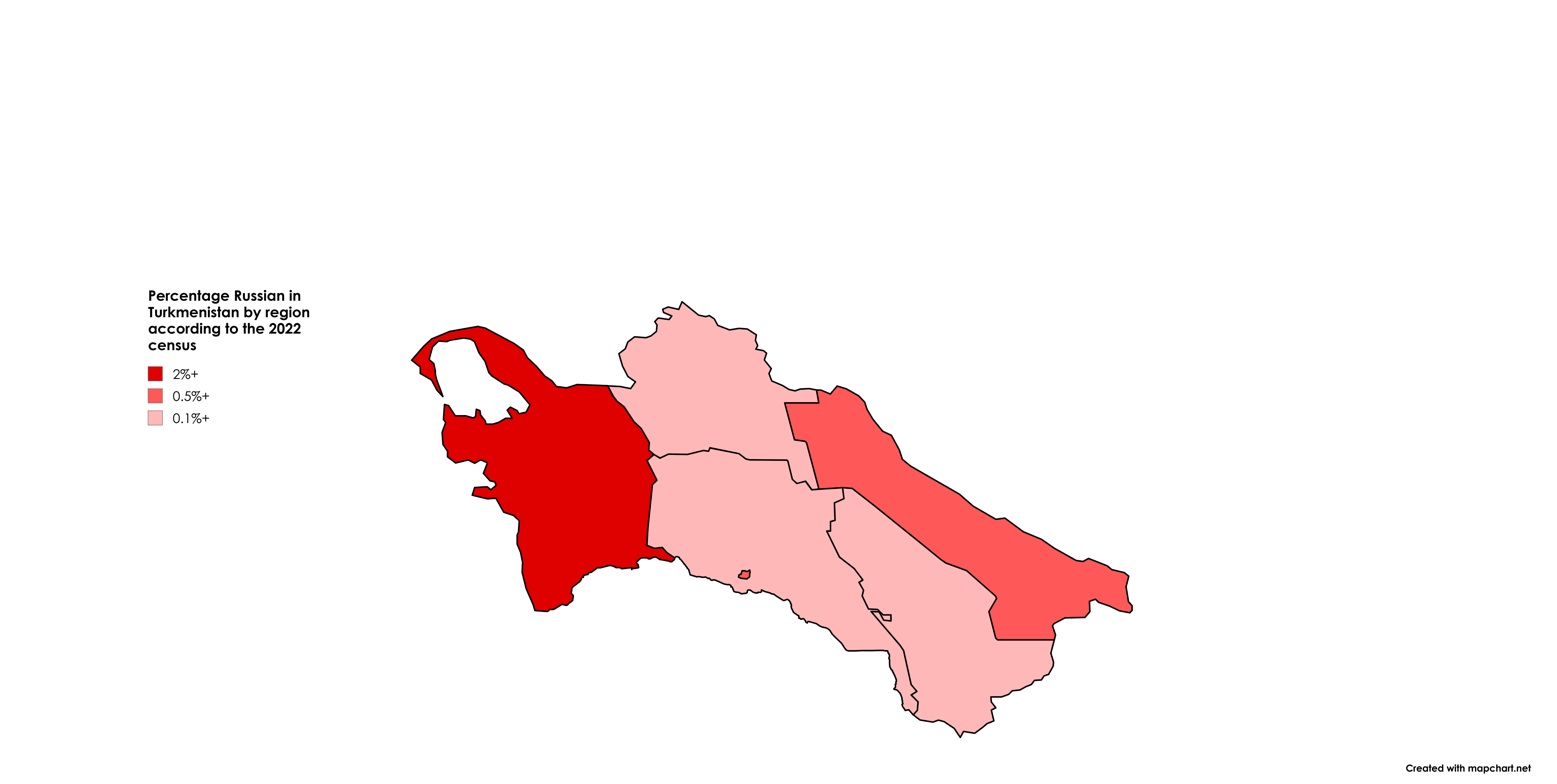
Russians in Turkmenistan by percentage of region

== Discrimination ==
The Turkmen government's decision to cancel a dual-citizenship agreement with Russia in 2003 prompted thousands of ethnic Russians to leave Turkmenistan as they lost their property. Many of those fleeing "in panic" reportedly feared being trapped in a state which has been widely criticised for human rights abuses and has imposed severe restrictions on foreign travel for its citizens. Those without Russian passports may be forced to become Turkmens, and fear that they may never be able to return to Russia.

For these who remained, estimated at around 100,000, all Soviet-time diplomas, certificates and other official documents that were issued outside the Turkmen SSR were nullified, drastically limiting the people's access to work. At the same time, universities have been encouraged to reject applicants with non-Turkmen surnames, especially ethnic Russians. Russian television is difficult to receive in Turkmenistan, the Russian-language radio station Mayak was taken off the air and the Russian newspapers were banned earlier.

== See also ==
- Demographics of Turkmenistan
- Russia–Turkmenistan relations
- Ethnic Russians in post-Soviet states
