= Geographical distribution of Russian speakers =

Modern distribution of Russophones:
Sole official language
Co-official language
Cultural or secondary language (more than 15% Russian speakers)

Russian language in the Russian Empire and its satellite states according to the 1897 census

This article details the geographical distribution of Russian speakers. After the dissolution of the Soviet Union in 1991, the status of the Russian language often became a matter of controversy. Some Post-Soviet states adopted policies of derussification aimed at reversing former trends of Russification, while Belarus under Alexander Lukashenko and the Russian Federation under Vladimir Putin reintroduced Russification policies in the 1990s and 2000s, respectively.

After the collapse of the Russian Empire in 1917, derussification occurred in the newly-independent Poland, Estonia, Latvia, Lithuania, Bessarabia and the Kars Oblast, the last two of which became part of Romania and Turkey respectively.

The new Soviet Union initially implemented a policy of Korenizatsiya, which was aimed in some ways at the reversal of the Tsarist Russification of the non-Russian areas of the country. Joseph Stalin mostly reversed the implementation of Korenizatsiya by the 1930s, not so much by changing the letter of the law, but by reducing its practical effects and by introducing de facto Russification. The Soviet system heavily promoted Russian as the "language of interethnic communication" and "language of world communism".

Eventually, in 1990, Russian became legally the official all-Union language of the Soviet Union, with constituent republics gaining the right to declare their own regional languages.

After the dissolution of the Soviet Union in 1991, about 25 million Russians (about a sixth of the former Soviet Russians) found themselves outside Russia and were about 10% of the population of the post-Soviet states other than Russia. Millions of them later became refugees from various interethnic conflicts.

== Statistics ==
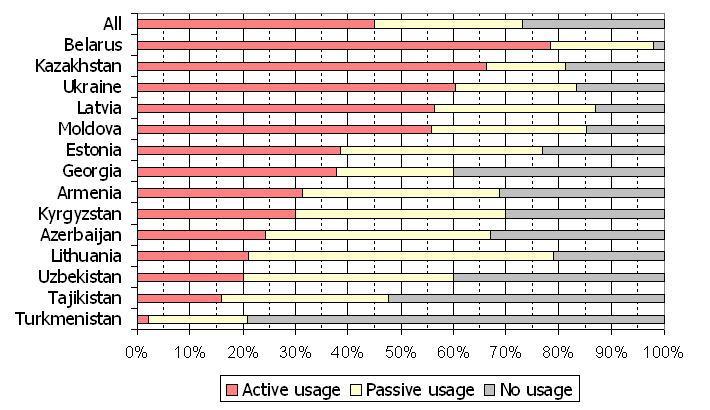
Competence of Russian in the countries of the former USSR outside of the Russian Federation, 2004

=== Native speakers ===
Country	Speakers		Year	Ref.
Country	Number	Percentage	Year	Ref.
Russia	118,581,514	85.7%	2010	
Ukraine	14,273,670	29.6%	2001	
Belarus	6,672,964	70.2%	2009	(Note: Data note: "Data refer to mother tongue, defined as the language usually spoken in the individual's home in his or her early childhood." (From the Footnotes section in the cited source))
Kazakhstan	3,793,800	21.2%	2017	(Note: Based on a 2016 population of 17,855,000 (UN Statistics Division))
Uzbekistan	720,300	2.1%	2021	
Latvia	698,757	33.8%	2011	
Kyrgyzstan	482,200	8.9%	2009	
Estonia	383,118	29.6%	2011	
Turkmenistan	135,565	1.9%	2022	
Moldova	264,162	9.7%	2014	
Lithuania	190,733	6.8%	2021	
Azerbaijan	77,190	0.8%	2019	
Georgia	45,920	1.2%	2014	
Tajikistan	40,598	0.5%	2012	
Armenia	23,484	0.8%	2011	
Australia	54,874	0.2%	2022	
Austria	8,446	0.1%	2001	
Canada	220,360	0.6%	2021	
Croatia	1,592	0.04%	2011	
Cyprus	21,642	2.3%	2021	
Czech Republic	96,361	0.9%	2021	(Note: Included people with two mother tongues.)
Finland	87,552	1.6%	2021	
Germany	1,877,000	2.3%	2024	
Guinea-Bissau	2,104	0.14%	2009	
Israel	1,155,960	15%	2011	(Note: Based on a 2011 population of 7,706,400 (Central Bureau of Statistics of Israel))
Luxembourg	3,325	0.6%	2021	
Mauritius	40	0.003%	2011	
New Zealand	7,896	0.2%	2006	
Norway	16,833	0.3%	2012	
Poland	63,271	0.17%	2021	(Note: Included all people who declared that they spoke Russian at home; 58,451 of them also spoke another language at home.)
Romania	23,487	0.11%	2011	
Serbia	3,179	0.04%	2011	
Slovakia	4,947	0.10%	2021	
Spain	147,864	0.3%	2021	
Sweden	29,000	0.3%	2012	
United States	1,004,815	0.3%	2023	
Total	151,214,523			

==== Subnational territories ====
Territory	Country	L1 speakers	Percentage	Year	Reference
Harju County	Estonia	208,517	37.7%	2011	
Ida-Viru County	Estonia	121,680	81.6%	2011	
Riga Region	Latvia	326,478	55.8%	2011	
Pieriga Region	Latvia	87,769	25.9%	2011	
Vidzeme Region	Latvia	16,682	8.4%	2011	
Kurzeme Region	Latvia	47,213	19.3%	2011	
Zemgale Region	Latvia	54,761	23.3%	2011	
Latgale Region	Latvia	165,854	60.3%	2011	
Klaipėda County	Lithuania	34,074	10.57%	2021	
Utena County	Lithuania	18,551	14.54%	2021	
Vilnius County	Lithuania	109,045	13.45%	2021	

=== Native and non-native speakers ===
==== Former Soviet Union ====
Country	Speakers	Percentage	Year	Reference
Armenia	1,906,327	65.3%	2022	(Note: Included 13,146 native speakers and 1,893,181 non-native speakers. Number of native speakers was likely to be an undercount since it only explicitly counted ethnic Russians.)
Azerbaijan	643,737	6.7%	2019	(Note: Excluded territory controlled by Republic of Artsakh at that time, and included only those who spoke Russian fluently)
Estonia	887,270	66.6%	2021	(Note: Includes 379,210 native and 508,060 non-native speakers.)
Georgia	3,181,590	87.0%	2019	
Kazakhstan	14,391,085	83.7%	2021	
Kyrgyzstan	3,432,633	49.5%	2022	(Note: Data referred to the resident population. Included 321,947 native speakers (of which 282,777 were ethnic Russians and 39,170 were of other ethnic groups) and 3,110,686 L2 speakers (of which 61,460 were ethnic Russians 3,049,226 were of other ethnic groups).)
Lithuania	1,894,158	67.4%	2021	(Note: Includes 190,733 native and 1,703,425 non-native speakers.)
Latvia	1,403,776	76.2%	2024	
Russia	134,319,233	99.4%	2021	(Note: Data note: "Including all of persons who stated each language spoken, whether as their only language or as one of several languages. Where a person reported more than one language spoken, they have been counted in each applicable group." Percentage excluded 12,056,452 people who didn't report language proficiency.)
Tajikistan	1,963,857	25.9%	2010	
Turkmenistan	1,359,455	19.3%	2022	(Note: Included 135,565 native speakers and 1,183,890 non-native speakers)
Ukraine	22,346,160	68.0%	2006	

==== Other countries ====
Country	Percentage	Year	Reference
Bulgaria	10.8%	2024	
Cyprus	3.2%	2024	
Czechia	6.5%	2024	
Hungary	1.6%	2011	
Germany	2.0%	2024	
Slovakia	7.1%	2024	
Poland	1.1%	2024	

== Asia ==
=== Armenia ===
In Armenia, Russian has no official status but is recognized as a minority language under the Framework Convention for the Protection of National Minorities. According to estimates from Demoskop Weekly, in 2004 there were 15,000 native speakers of Russian in the country, and 1 million active speakers. 30% of the population was fluent in Russian in 2006, and 2% used it as the main language with family or friends or at work. Russian is spoken by 1.4% of the population according to a 2009 estimate from the World Factbook.

In 2010, in a significant pullback to derussification, Armenia voted to re-introduce Russian-medium schools.

=== Azerbaijan ===
In Azerbaijan, Russian has no official status but is a lingua franca of the country. According to estimates from Demoskop Weekly, in 2004 there were 250,000 native speakers of Russian in the country, and 2 million active speakers. 26% of the population was fluent in Russian in 2006, and 5% used it as the main language with family or friends or at work.

Research in 2005–2006 concluded that government officials did not consider Russian to be a threat to the strengthening role of the Azerbaijani language in independent Azerbaijan. Rather, Russian continued to have value given the proximity of Russia and strong economic and political ties. However, it was seen as self-evident that to be successful, citizens needed to be proficient in Azerbaijani. The Russian language was co-official in the breakaway Armenian-populated Republic of Artsakh.

=== China ===
In the 1920s, the Chinese Communist Party and the Chinese Nationalist Party sent influential figures to study abroad in the Soviet Union, including Deng Xiaoping and Chiang Ching-kuo, who both were classmates and fluent in Russian. Historically, due to ties and geographic proximity between China and the Soviet Union, Russian was the primary foreign language of instruction as opposed to English. However, after the Sino-Soviet Split and upon reform and opening up English eclipsed Chinese as the foreign language of instruction. Now, Russian is generally only spoken by the small Russian communities in the border provinces of Heilongjiang, Inner Mongolia, and Xinjiang. Russian is official in the Enhe Russian ethnic township in Ergun, Inner Mongolia.

=== Israel ===
Russian is also spoken in Israel by at least 1,000,000 ethnic Jewish immigrants from the former Soviet Union, according to the 1999 census. The Israeli press and websites regularly publish material in Russian, and there are Russian newspapers, television stations, schools, and social media outlets based in the country.

=== Kazakhstan ===
In Kazakhstan, Russian is not a state language, but according to Article 7 of the Constitution of Kazakhstan, its usage enjoys equal status to that of the Kazakh language in state and local administration. According to estimates from Demoskop Weekly, in 2004 there were 4,200,000 native speakers of Russian in the country and 10 million active speakers. 63% of the population was fluent in Russian in 2006, and 46% used it as the main language with family, friends or at work. According to a 2001 estimate from the World Factbook, 95% of the population can speak Russian. Large Russian-speaking communities still exist in northern Kazakhstan, and ethnic Russians comprise 25.6% of Kazakhstan's population. The 2009 census reported that 10,309,500 people, or 84.8% of the population aged 15 and above, could read and write well in Russian and understand the spoken language.

=== Kyrgyzstan ===
In Kyrgyzstan, Russian is an official language per Article 5 of the Constitution of Kyrgyzstan. According to estimates from Demoskop Weekly, in 2004 there were 600,000 native speakers of Russian in the country, and 1.5 million active speakers. 38% of the population was fluent in Russian in 2006, and 22% used it as the main language with family or friends or at work.

The 2009 census states that 482,200 people speak Russian as a native language, including 419,000 ethnic Russians, and 63,200 from other ethnic groups, for a total of 8.99% of the population. Additionally, 1,854,700 residents of Kyrgyzstan aged 15 and above fluently speak Russian as a second language, 49.6% of the population in that age group.

In 2011, President Roza Otunbaeva controversially reopened the debate about Kyrgyz getting a more dominant position in the country.

=== Tajikistan ===
In Tajikistan, Russian is the language of interethnic communication under the Constitution of Tajikistan. According to estimates from Demoskop Weekly, in 2004 there were 90,000 native speakers of Russian in the country and 1 million active speakers. 28% of the population was fluent in Russian in 2006, and 7% used it as the main language with family or friends or at work. The World Factbook notes that Russian is widely used in government and business.

After independence, Tajik was declared the state language, with Russian enshrined as the "language for interethnic communication" in the constitution. In 2009, a law was passed stating that all official papers in the country should have a version in the Tajik language. Russian media erroneously reported that as Russian losing its official status in the country. However, president Emomali Rahmon rejected these claims and clarified that the law regulates the scope of usage of only Tajik language, without changing the status of Russian, adding that "all laws and presidential decrees continue to be adopted in Tajik and Russian languages, dozens of newspapers and magazines are published in Russian, which, in my opinion, reflects the real state of affairs". Further rejecting claims of "persecution", Rahmon pointed out that "Russian is taught in all schools without exception, of which there are more than four thousand in total", with more than 31,000 students further studying Russian as their major in universities. He added: "We are clearly aware that for decades the Russian language has been and remains a window into science for us, a means of communication with the outside world, and wasting this capital would be to our own detriment."

The law was edited in 2011 to clear up the confusion, with Russian media claiming that "Russian language's status was restored", despite keeping its status in the constitution the whole time.

Current law states that all minority ethnic groups in the country have the right to choose the language in which they want their children to be educated.

On April 17, 2019, Russia and Tajikistan signed an agreement on the construction and material and technical equipment of schools in the cities of Dushanbe, Kulob, Khujand, Bokhtar and Tursunzade providing education in the Russian language. Opening the new Russian schools, President Rahmon emphasized that the Constitution of Tajikistan defines Russian as a language of inter-ethnic communication, and this constitutional provision is being implemented through the widespread study of the Russian language from the second grade onwards in all schools. Emomali Rahmon also declared 2023 the Year of the Russian Language in Tajikistan.

Currently, there are 39 schools in the country with fully Russian language of instruction, where about 27 thousand children study. There are also more than 170 mixed Tajik-Russian schools attended by 70,000 children. Russian language teaching is a mandatory element of the curriculum and, starting from the second grade, it is studied in all general education schools of Tajikistan, which is about 4000 educational institutions.

=== Turkmenistan ===
Russian lost its status as the official lingua franca of Turkmenistan in 1996. According to estimates from Demoskop Weekly, in 2004 there were 150,000 native speakers of Russian in the country and 100,000 active speakers. Russian is spoken by 12% of the population, according to an undated estimate from the World Factbook.

Russian television channels have mostly been shut down in Turkmenistan, and many Russian-language schools were closed down.

=== Uzbekistan ===
In Uzbekistan, Russian has no official status but is a lingua franca and a de-facto language throughout the country. According to estimates from Demoskop Weekly, in 2004 there were 1,200,000 native speakers of Russian in the country and 5 million active speakers. Russian is spoken by 14.2% of the population, according to an undated estimate from the World Factbook. Throughout the country, there are still signs with Uzbek and Russian.

After the independence of Uzbekistan in 1991, Uzbek culture underwent the three trends of derussification, the creation of an Uzbek national identity, and westernization. The state has primarily promoted those trends through the educational system, which is particularly effective because nearly half the Uzbek population is of school age or younger.

Since the Uzbek language became official and privileged in hiring and firing, there has been a brain drain of ethnic Russians in Uzbekistan. The displacement of the Russian-speaking population from the industrial sphere, science and education has weakened those spheres. As a result of emigration, participation in Russian cultural centers like the State Academy Bolshoi Theatre in Uzbekistan has seriously declined.

In the capital, Tashkent, statues of the leaders of the Russian Revolution were taken down and replaced with local heroes like Timur, and urban street names in the Russian style were Uzbekified. In 1995, Uzbekistan ordered the Uzbek alphabet changed from a Russian-based Cyrillic script to a modified Latin alphabet, and in 1997, Uzbek became the sole language of state administration.

=== Rest of Asia ===
In 2005, Russian was the most widely taught foreign language in Mongolia, and is compulsory in Year 7 onward as a second foreign language in 2006.

Russian is also spoken as a second language by a small number of people in Afghanistan.

== Oceania ==
=== Australia ===
Australian cities Melbourne and Sydney have Russian-speaking populations, most of which live in the southeast of Melbourne, particularly the suburbs of Carnegie and Caulfield. Two-thirds of them are actually Russian-speaking descendants of Germans, Greeks, Jews, Azerbaijanis, Armenians or Ukrainians, who either were repatriated after the Soviet Union collapsed or are just looking for temporary employment.

== Europe ==
=== Belarus ===
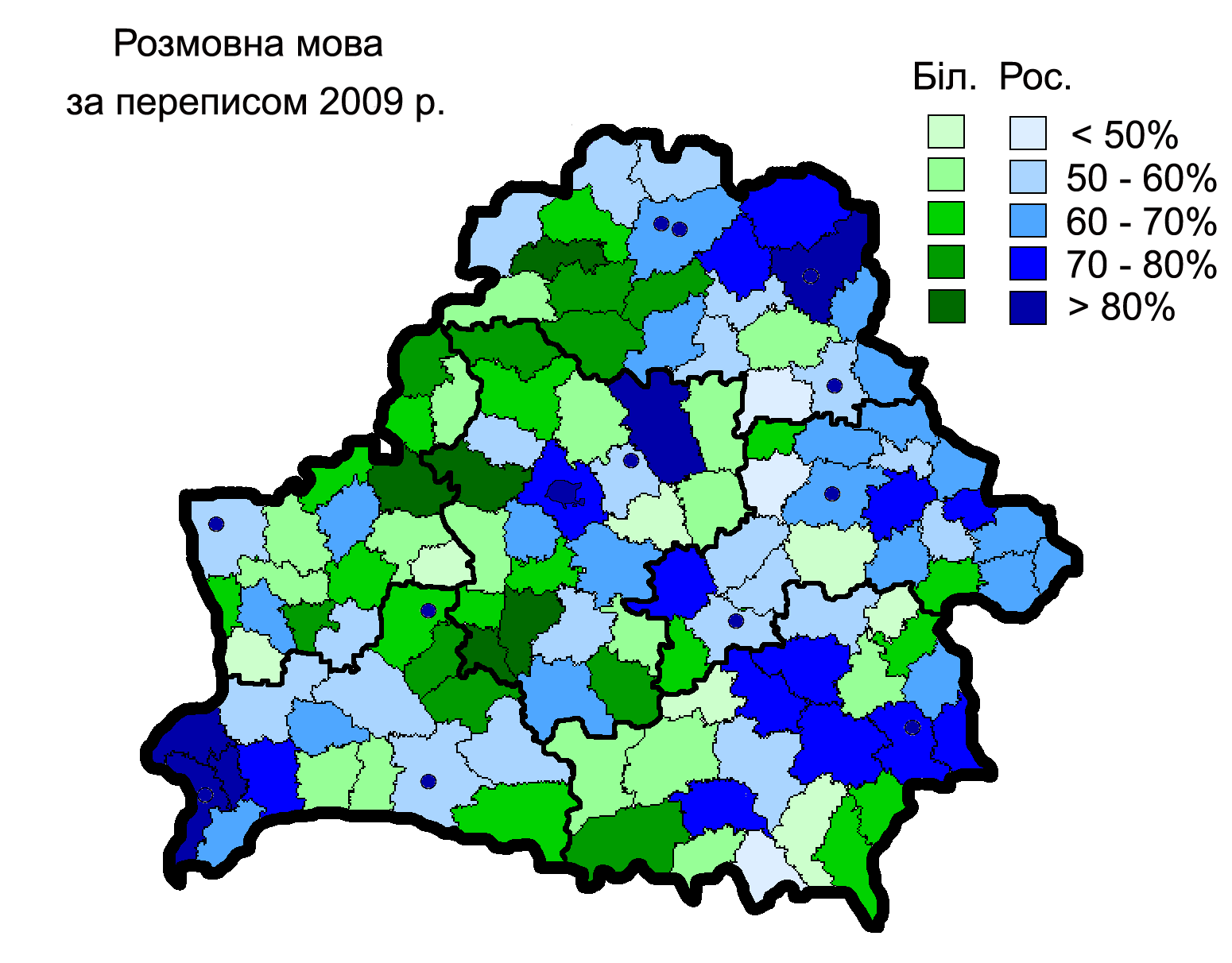
Languages of Belarus according to 2009 census (blue - Russian)

In Belarus, Russian is co-official alongside Belarusian per the Constitution of Belarus. According to estimates from Demoskop Weekly, in 2004 there were 3,243,000 native speakers of Russian in the country and 8 million active speakers; 77% of the population was fluent in Russian in 2006, and 67% used it as the main language with family or friends or at work.

Initially, when Belarus became independent in 1991 and the Belarusian language became the only state language, some derussification started. However, after Alexander Lukashenko became president, a referendum held in 1995, which was considered fraudulent by the Organization for Security and Co-operation in Europe, included a question about the status of Russian. It was made a state language, along with Belarusian.

In most spheres, the Russian language is by far the dominant one. In fact, almost all government information and websites are in Russian only.

=== Bulgaria ===
Bulgaria has the largest proportion of Russian-speakers among European countries that were not part of the Soviet Union. According to a 2012 Eurobarometer survey, 19% of the population understands Russian well enough to follow the news, television, or radio. Native Russian speakers are 0.24%.

=== Estonia ===
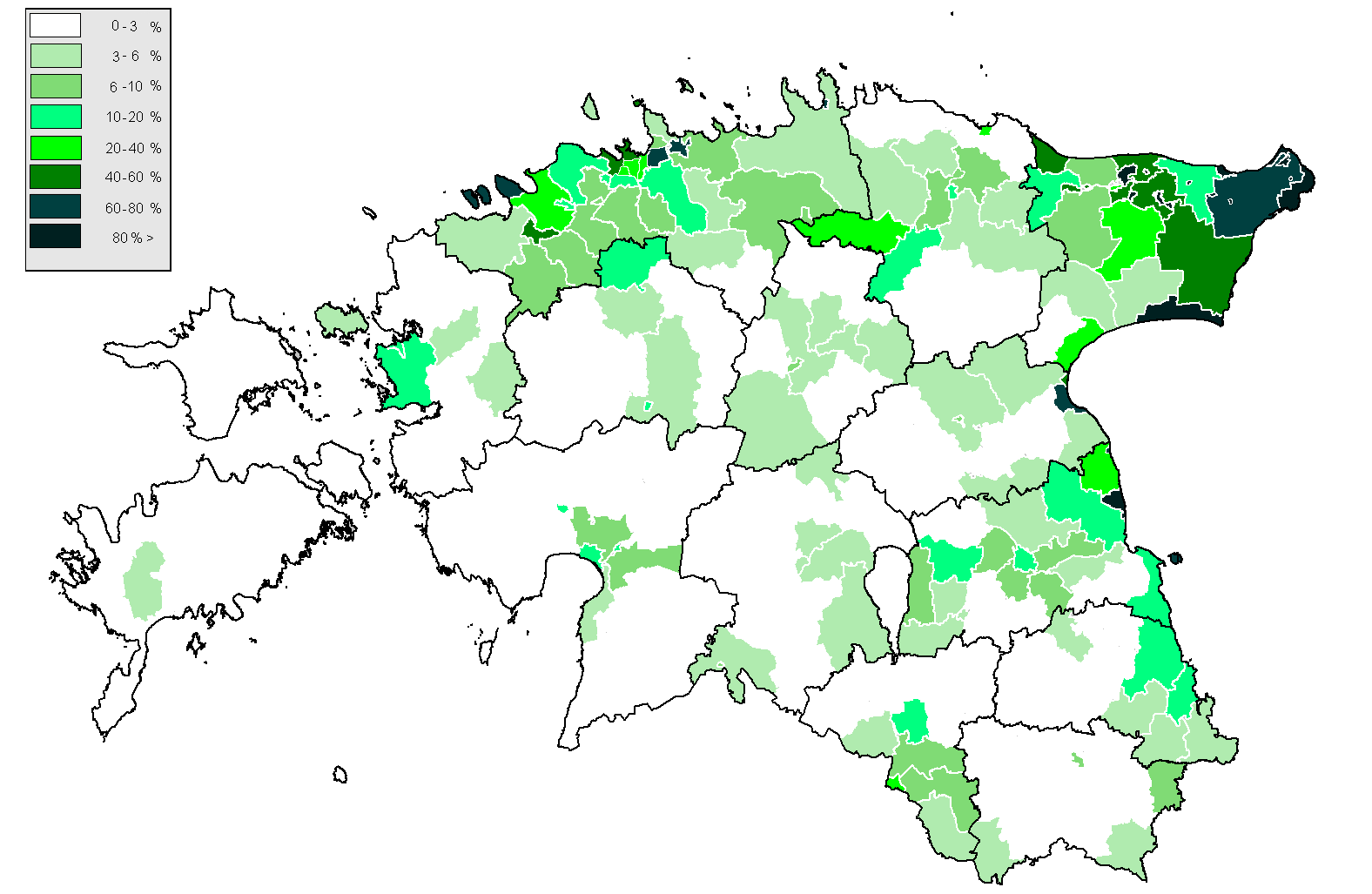
Russophone population in Estonia, 2000 census

In Estonia, Russian is officially considered a foreign language. According to estimates from Demoskop Weekly, in 2004 there were 470,000 native speakers of Russian in the country, and 500,000 active speakers, 35% of the population was fluent in Russian in 2006, and 25% used it as the main language with family or friends or at work. Russian is spoken by 29.6% of the population, according to a 2011 estimate from the World Factbook.

Ethnic Russians are 25.5% of the country's current population and 58.6% of the native Estonian population is also able to speak Russian. In all, 67.8% of Estonia's population could speak Russian. The command of Russian, however, is rapidly decreasing among younger Estonians and is primarily being replaced by the command of English. For example, 53% of ethnic Estonians between 15 and 19 claimed to speak some Russian in 2000, but among the 10- to 14-year-old group, command of Russian had fallen to 19%, about one third the percentage of those who claim to command English in the same age group.

In 2007, Amnesty International harshly criticized what it termed Estonia's harassment of Russian-speakers. In 2010, the language inspectorate stepped up inspections at workplaces to ensure that state employees spoke Estonian at an acceptable level. That included inspections of teachers at Russian-medium schools. Amnesty International continues to criticize Estonian policies: "Non-Estonian speakers, mainly from the Russian-speaking minority, were denied employment due to official language requirements for various professions in the private sector and almost all professions in the public sector. Most did not have access to affordable language training that would enable them to qualify for employment."

The percentage of Russian speakers in Estonia is still declining, but not as fast as in the most of ex-Soviet countries. After overcoming the consequences of 2008 financial crisis, the tendency of emigration of Russian speakers has almost stopped, unlike in Latvia or in Lithuania.

=== Finland ===
Russian is spoken by about 1.7% of the population of Finland. In 2014, it was spoken by about 1.4% of the immigrant population, according to an estimate from the World Factbook., making it one of the most-spoken immigrant language in Finland.

Until 2022, the popularity of Russian language was growing because of an increase in trade with and tourism from Russia and other Russian-speaking countries and regions. However, after the Russian invasion of Ukraine, various statistics show a notable decline in the popularity of Russian language in Finnish society. There was an increasing demand for knowledge of Russian in the workplace, which was also reflected in its growing presence in the Finnish education system, including higher education. A 2011 report from Yle showed that in Eastern Finland, most prominently in its border towns, Russian rivaled Swedish as the second most important foreign language due to a high tourism rate from Russia throughout the past decades.

=== Georgia ===
In Georgia, Russian has no official status but is recognized as a minority language under the Framework Convention for the Protection of National Minorities. According to estimates from Demoskop Weekly, in 2004 there were 130,000 native speakers of Russian in the country, and 1.7 million active speakers. 27% of the population was fluent in Russian in 2006, and 1% used it as the main language with family, friends or at work. Russian is the language of 9% of the population according to the World Factbook.

Georgianization has been pursued with most official and private signs only in the Georgian language, with English being the favored foreign language. Exceptions are older signs remaining from Soviet times, which are generally bilingual Georgian and Russian. Private signs and advertising in the Samtskhe-Javakheti region, which has a majority Armenian population, are generally in Russian only or Georgian and Russian. In the Kvemo Kartli borderline region, which has a majority ethnic Azerbaijani population, signs and advertising are often in Russian only, in Georgian and Azerbaijani, or Georgian and Russian. Derussification has not been pursued in the areas outside Georgian government control: Abkhazia and South Ossetia.

The Russian language is co-official in the breakaway republics of Abkhazia, and South Ossetia.

=== Germany ===
Germany has the highest Russian-speaking population outside the former Soviet Union, with approximately 3 million people. They are split into three groups, from largest to smallest: Russian-speaking ethnic Germans (Aussiedler), ethnic Russians, and Jews.

=== Latvia ===
Percent of Russian speakers in different regions of Latvia, 2011 census

The 1922 Constitution of Latvia, restored in 1990, enacted Latvian as the sole official language.

Despite large Russian-speaking minorities in Latvia (26.9% ethnic Russians, 2011), the Russian language has no official status. According to Russian sources, 55% of the population was fluent in Russian in 2006, and 26% used it as the main language with family or friends or at work.

A constitutional referendum, held in February 2012, proposed amendments to the constitution of Latvia to make Russian the second state language of Latvia, but 821,722 (75%) of the voters voted against and 273,347 (25%) for. There has been criticism that about 290,000 of the 557,119 (2011) ethnic Russians in Latvia are non-citizens and do not have the right to vote. Since 2019, instruction in Russian is gradually discontinued in private colleges and universities, as well general instruction in public high schools except for subjects related to culture and history of the Russian minority, such as Russian language and literature classes.

=== Lithuania ===
In 1992 Constitution of Lithuania, the Lithuanian language was declared as the sole state language. This was also the case in the 1922—1938 interwar constitutions.

In Lithuania, Russian has no official or any other legal status, but the use of the language has some presence in certain areas. A large part of the population (63% as of 2011), especially the older generations, can speak Russian as a foreign language. Only 3% used it as the main language with family or friends or at work, though. English has replaced Russian as lingua franca in Lithuania and around 80% of young people speak English as the first foreign language. Russian is still available to take in some schools in Lithuania, but is not mandatory like during the Soviet period. They have options to take German, French, Spanish, etc. In contrast to the other two Baltic states, Lithuania has a relatively small Russian-speaking minority (5.0% as of 2008).

Unlike Latvia or Estonia, Lithuania has never implemented the practice of regarding some former Soviet citizens as non-citizens.

=== Moldova ===
In Moldova, Russian has a status similar to the other recognized minority languages; it was also considered to be the language of interethnic communication under a Soviet-era law.

According to estimates from Demoskop Weekly, in 2004 there were 450,000 native speakers of Russian in the country and 1.9 million active speakers. 50% of the population was fluent in Russian in 2006, and 19% used it as the main language with family or friends or at work. According to the 2014 census, Russian was the native language of 9.68% of Moldovans, and the language of first use for 14.49% of the population. It decreased to being the mother tongue of 11.1% of the population according to the 2024 Moldovan census.

Russian has co-official status alongside Romanian in the autonomies of Gagauzia and the Left Bank of the Dniester. It is also a co-official language alongside Romanian (officially termed "Moldovan") and Ukrainian in Moldova's unrecognized breakaway region of Transnistria.

=== Romania ===
According to the 2011 Romanian census, there are 23,487 Russian-speaking Lipovans practicing the Lipovan Orthodox Old-Rite Church. They are concentrated in Dobruja, mainly in the Tulcea County but also in the Constanța County. Outside Dobruja, the Lipovans of Romania live mostly in the Suceava County and in the cities of Iași, Brăila and Bucharest.

=== Russia ===
According to the census of 2010 in Russia, Russian skills were indicated by 138 million people (99.4% population), and according to the 2002 census, the number was 142.6 million people (99.2% population). Among urban residents, 101 million people (99.8%) had Russian language skills, and in rural areas, the number was 37 million people (98.7%). The number of native Russian-speakers in 2010 was 118.6 million (85.7%), a bit higher than the number of ethnic Russians (111 million, or 80.9%).

Russian is the official language of Russia but shares the official status at regional level with other languages in the numerous ethnic autonomies within Russia, such as Chuvashia, Bashkortostan, Tatarstan, and Yakutia, and 94% of school students in Russia receive their education primarily in Russian.

In Dagestan, Chechnya, and Ingushetia, derussification is understood not so much directly as the disappearance of Russian language and culture but rather by the exodus of Russian-speaking people themselves, which intensified after the First and the Second Chechen Wars and Islamization; by 2010, it had reached a critical point. The displacement of the Russian-speaking population from industry, science and education has weakened those spheres.

In the Republic of Karelia, it was announced in 2007 that the Karelian language would be used at national events, but Russian is still the only official language (Karelian is one of several "national" languages), and virtually all business and education is conducted in Russian. In 2010, less than 8% of the republic's population was ethnic Karelian.

Russification is reported to be continuing in Mari El.

=== Ukraine ===
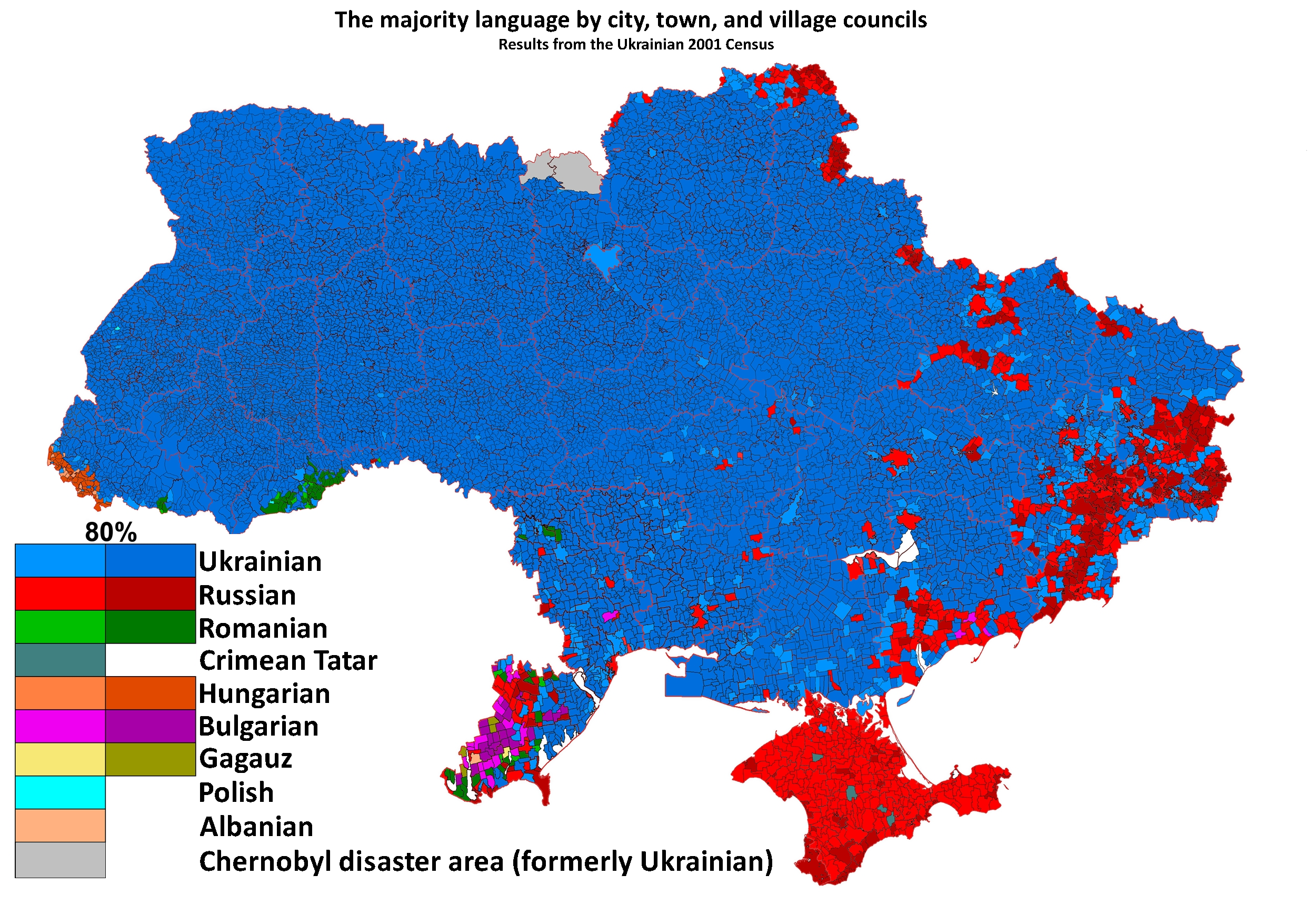
Ukrainian Census (2001): 50–80% native Russian speakers 80–100% native Russian speakers Millions of people that declared Russian as their mother tongue simultaneously declared Ukrainian ethnicity in the same census.

In Ukraine, Russian is seen as a minority language under the 1996 Constitution of Ukraine. According to estimates from Demoskop Weekly, in 2004 there were 14,400,000 native speakers of Russian in the country and 29 million active speakers; 65% of the population was fluent in Russian in 2006, and 38% used it as the main language with family or friends or at work.

In 1990, Russian became legally the official all-Union language of the Soviet Union, with constituent republics having rights to declare their own official languages. In 1989, the Ukrainian SSR government adopted Ukrainian as its official language, which was affirmed after the fall of the Soviet Union as the only official state language of the newly-independent Ukraine. The educational system was transformed over the first decade of independence from a system that was overwhelmingly Russian to one in which over 75% of tuition was in Ukrainian. The government has also mandated a progressively increased role for Ukrainian in the media and commerce.

In 2012 poll by RATING, 50% of respondents consider Ukrainian their native language, 29% - Russian, 20% consider both Ukrainian and Russian their mother tongue, another 1% considers a different language their native language.). However, the transition lacked most of the controversies that surrounded the derussification in several of the other former Soviet Republics.

In some cases, the abrupt changing of the language of instruction in institutions of secondary and higher education led to charges of assimilation, which were raised mostly by Russian-speakers. In various elections, the adoption of Russian as an official language was an election promise by one of the main candidates (Leonid Kuchma in 1994, Viktor Yanukovych in 2004, and the Party of Regions in 2012). After the introduction of the 2012 legislation on languages in Ukraine, Russian was declared a "regional language" in several southern and eastern parts of Ukraine. On 28 February 2018, the Constitutional Court of Ukraine ruled that legislation to be unconstitutional.

A poll conducted in March 2022 by RATING found that 83% of Ukrainians believe that Ukrainian should be the only state language of Ukraine. This opinion dominates in all macro-regions, age and language groups. On the other hand, before the war, almost a quarter of Ukrainians were in favour of granting Russian the status of the state language, while today only 7% support it. In peacetime, Russian was traditionally supported by residents of the south and east. But even in these regions, only a third of them were in favour, and after Russia's full-scale invasion, their number dropped by almost half.

According to the survey carried out by RATING on 16-20 August 2023, almost 60% of the polled usually speak Ukrainian at home, about 30% – Ukrainian and Russian, only 9% – Russian. Since March 2022, the use of Russian in everyday life has been noticeably decreasing. For 82 per cent of respondents, Ukrainian is their mother tongue, and for 16 per cent, Russian is their mother tongue. IDPs and refugees living abroad are more likely to use both languages for communication or speak Russian. Nevertheless, more than 70 per cent of IDPs and refugees consider Ukrainian to be their native language.

=== Rest of Europe ===
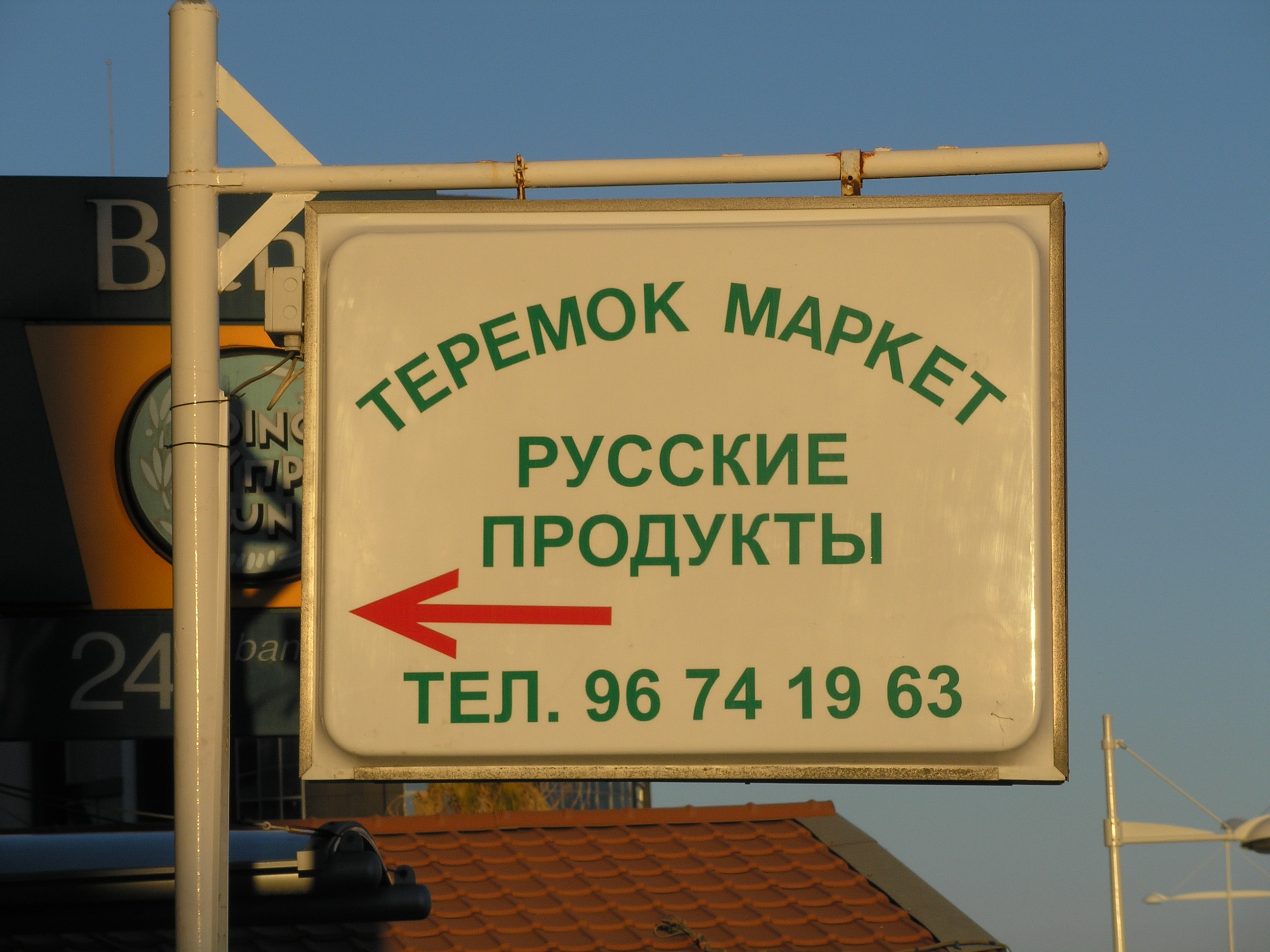
Russian minimarket in Limassol, Cyprus; translation: "Teremok market. Russian products. Phone number: 96 74 19 63"

In the 20th century, Russian was a mandatory language taught in the schools of the members of the old Warsaw Pact and in other communist countries that used to be Soviet satellites, including Poland, Bulgaria, the Czech Republic, Slovakia, Hungary, Albania, the former East Germany and Cuba. However, younger generations are usually not fluent in it because Russian is no longer mandatory in schools. According to the Eurobarometer 2005 survey, fluency in Russian remains fairly high, however, at (20–40%) in some countries, particularly those whose people speak a Slavic language and so have an edge in learning Russian (Poland, the Czech Republic, Slovakia, and Bulgaria).

Significant Russian-speaking groups also exist in other parts of Europe and have been fed by several waves of immigrants since the beginning of the 20th century, each with its own flavor of language. The United Kingdom, Spain, Portugal, France, Italy, Belgium, Greece, Norway, and Austria have significant Russian-speaking communities.

According to the 2011 census of Ireland, there were 21,639 people using Russian at home. However, only 13% were Russian nationals. 20% held Irish citizenship, while 27% and 14% were Latvian and Lithuanian citizens respectively.

There were 20,984 Russian-speakers in Cyprus according to the 2011 census of 2011 and accounted for 2.5% of the population.

Russian is spoken by 1.6% of the people of Hungary according to a 2011 estimate from the World Factbook.

== Americas ==
The language was first introduced in North America when Russian explorers voyaged into Alaska and claimed it for Russia in the 1700s. Although most Russian colonists left after the United States bought the land in 1867, a handful stayed and have preserved the Russian language in the region although only a few elderly speakers of their unique dialect are left. In Nikolaevsk, Russian is more spoken than English. Sizable Russian-speaking communities also exist in North America, especially in large urban centers of the US and Canada, such as New York City, Philadelphia, Boston, Los Angeles, Nashville, San Francisco, Seattle, Spokane, Toronto, Calgary, Baltimore, Miami, Chicago, Denver and Cleveland. In a number of locations, they issue their own newspapers, and live in ethnic enclaves (especially the generation of immigrants who started arriving in the early 1960s). Only about 25% of them are ethnic Russians, however. Before the dissolution of the Soviet Union, the overwhelming majority of Russophones in Brighton Beach, Brooklyn in New York City were Russian-speaking Jews. Afterward, the influx from the countries of the former Soviet Union changed the statistics somewhat, with ethnic Russians and Ukrainians immigrating along with some more Russian Jews and Central Asians. According to the United States Census, in 2007 Russian was the primary language spoken in the homes of over 850,000 individuals living in the United States.

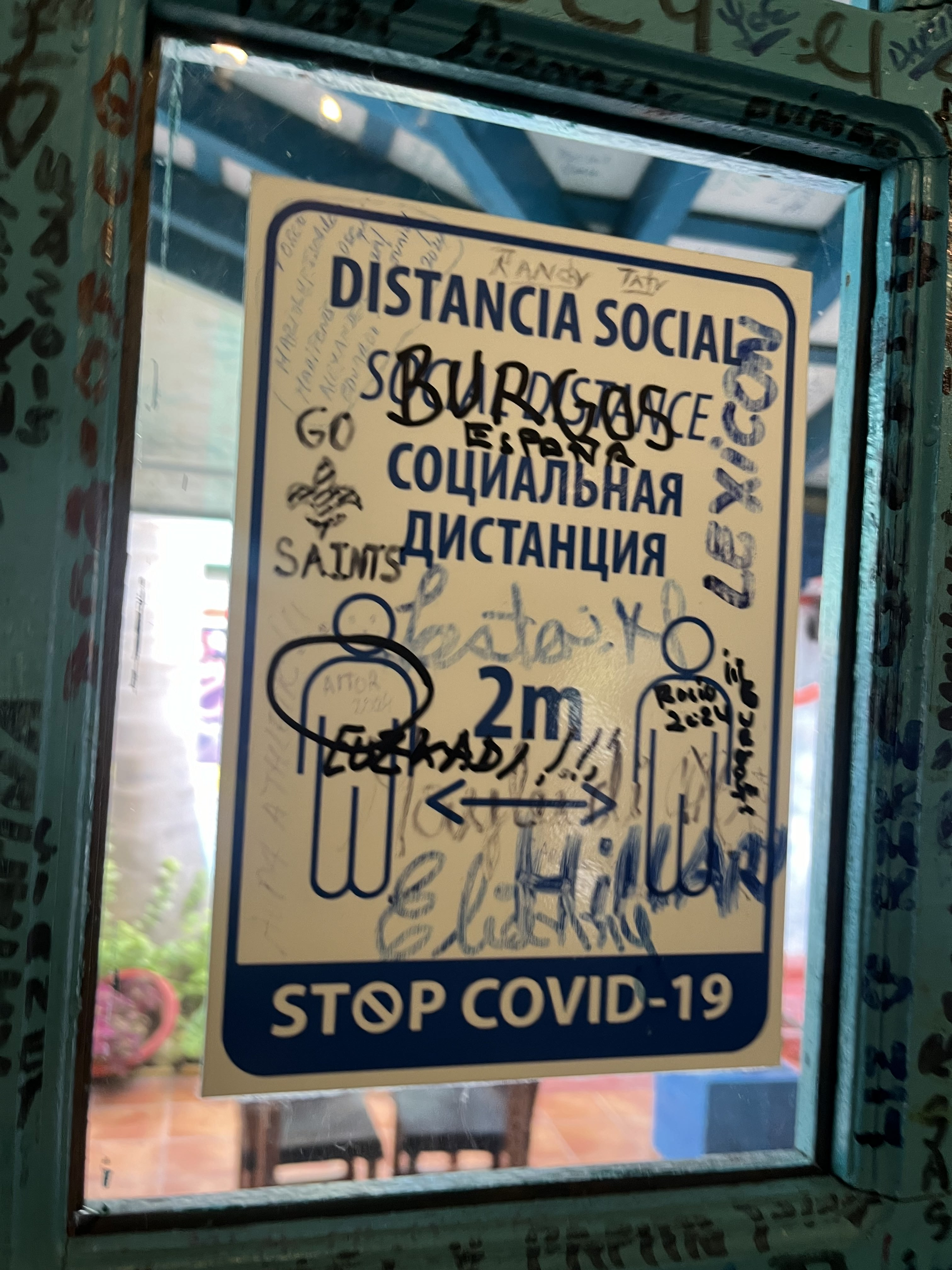
Sign encouraging social distancing in Spanish and Russian in Cuba

Russian was the most popular language in Cuba in the second half of the 20th century. Besides being taught at universities and schools, there were also educational programs on the radio and TV. It is now making a come-back in the country.

== See also ==
- Russian diaspora
- Russification
- "Russian world"
- Dialect continuum
- List of lingua francas
- Geolinguistics
- Language geography
