= Vladimir Linderman =

Latvian politician (born 1958)

Vladimir Ilyich Linderman
- Влади́мир Ильи́ч Ли́ндерман
- Born: November 3, 1958 (age 68); Riga, Latvian SSR
- Occupations: politician, publicist
- Known for: Russian minority rights activism
- Political party: For native language!
- Movement: National Bolshevik Party
- Partner: Tatjana Zubareva
- Children: 4 children

Vladimir Ilyich Linderman (Russian: Влади́мир Ильи́ч Ли́ндерман, Latvian: Vladimirs Lindermans, pseudonym Abel (А́бель); born November 3, 1958) is a Latvian and Russian publicist, political dissident of Jewish origin, and a member of Russia's unregistered National Bolshevik Party since 1997. Linderman is a non-citizen of Latvia.

== Biography ==
In 1991, Linderman worked in the Russian editorial office of the Atmoda newspaper. In 1998 he was the leader of the Latvian branch of the National Bolshevik Party (NBP). From 2002, Linderman was a member of the Central Committee of the NBP. In November 2002, he went to Saratov to take part in the trial of the NBP founder Eduard Limonov as a defence witness. On September 24, 2003, Linderman was arrested by the Federal Security Service (FSS) in Moscow and spent 19 days in Lefortovo Prison. Latvia requested Russia to extradite him, but Russia refused, citing fears of political persecution. On June 21, 2006, Linderman was arrested again, but during his convoying to Latvia Linderman escaped and remained in hiding for two more years.

In 2008, Linderman was finally found and on March 20 extradited to Latvia, where he was accused of storing explosives, calling to overthrow the political system and planning to assassinate the President of Latvia Vaira Vīķe-Freiberga. On October 6, 2008, Linderman was given a one-year prison sentence suspended for twelve months for the possession of a TNT block with a detonator, but was cleared on the charges of inciting to overthrow the government due to lack of evidence. On October 26, 2008, he attempted to enter Estonia from Finland, but was detained at the Tallinn Passenger Port, where Linderman was informed he is banned from entering the country and sent back to Finland.

In 2009, Linderman became the founder and leader of the Latvian political party The 13 January Movement. In 2011, he was the co-founder of an NGO called "Mother Tongue" that initiated the unsuccessful constitutional referendum for making Russian a second state language in Latvia. On July 16, 2012, Linderman renamed The 13 January Movement to For the Native Language! and registered it as a political party. Soon after, he called his supporters to boycott SEB banka for refusing to open a bank account for the party.

In 2013, Linderman became the unofficial leader of a newly founded organization “Let’s Protect Our Children” that along with another organization called "Kin" began collecting signatures to initiate a referendum against "gay propaganda". In 2014, he and several other pro-Russian activists appeared in the Victory Day celebration at the Monument to the Liberators of Soviet Latvia and Riga from the German Fascist Invaders with flags of Donetsk People's Republic and expressed their support for the pro-Russian separatists.

On May 8, 2018, Linderman was arrested by the Security Police for a suspected incitement of national, ethnic and racial hatred, performing activities aimed against Latvia's independence, sovereignty, territorial integrity, state power and government structure, as well as organizing mass riots in a March 31 speech he gave at the "All-Latvian Parents Gathering" organized by the Latvian Russian Union. On May 10 Linderman was kept in custody, but finally released on May 22.
