= For the Native Language! =

Latvian political party

For the Native language!
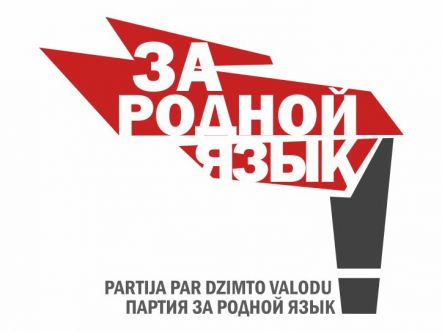
- Abbreviation: ZaRYa
- Leader: Vladimir Linderman
- Founded: 2009
- Registered: 2012
- Dissolved: 2016
- Headquarters: Riga
- Ideology: Russian minority politics Russophilia; National Bolshevism; Socialism
- Political position: Syncretic

For the Native Language! (Russian: За родной язык!; Latvian: Par dzimto valodu!) was a political party in Latvia. The party was led by Vladimir Linderman.

== History ==
In 2009, Latvian national-bolsheviks established the political party "The 13 January Movement".

In 2011 Vladimir Linderman was co-founder of an NGO called "Native Language" and initiated constitutional referendum in Latvia for the purpose of granting the Russian language the status of a state language.

At the congress of the party "Movement of January 13", it was decided to rename it to the party "For Native Language" due to the fact that the main task of this political force was to hold a referendum on granting the Russian language the status of a state language.

On 16 July 2012, The Register of Enterprises officially registered the political party "For the Native Language!". In February 2016, the Kurzeme District Court of Riga decided to liquidate the party following a lawsuit filed by the Corruption Prevention and Combating Bureau.

During the 2012 Latvian constitutional referendum, 273,347 people voted in favor of the Russian language, but this was not enough to pass the proposed amendments. After the referendum, the party initiated a number of public actions in defense of the Russian-speaking population of Latvia and non-citizens of the country, deprived of the right to citizenship by the decision of the Supreme Council of Latvia on October 15, 1991.

The party participated in the 2013 Latvian municipal elections, but did not win any seats in any local government. In Riga, the party's result was 0.34% (774 votes).

== Political Positions ==
For the Native Language! supports increased role for Russian language in education and public administration. It also supports changes in Latvian citizenship so that it would be awarded to a large number of non-citizens. Economically, "The 13 January Movement" supported socialism.

== Court Cases ==
When the party was active, it was involved in a number of high-profile lawsuits and court cases.

=== Linderman v. Vīķe-Freiberga ===
The first case involving the party leaders was Vladimir Linderman's claim for compensation for moral damages inflicted on him by former Latvian President Vaira Vīķe-Freiberga during an interview with the newspaper "Latvijas avīze" and its portal, in the amount of five thousand Latvian lats. The claim was initially not accepted for consideration by the Central District Court, but the Riga Regional Court overturned this decision and on 11 July 2012 demanded that the claim be considered.

Illarion Girs, who defended Linderman in court, accused the former president of “demonizing an honest fighter for equality.” In her interview, Freiberga claimed that Vladimir Linderman was a "dangerous element for society", that he was "an extremist", and that he was "detained with propaganda materials against the sovereignty of the Latvian Republic". According to Article 2352 of the Civil Code, Freiberga must prove the truth of her statement in all three parts in court, but this was not done.

The ex-president's defense insisted that Vike-Freiberga did not slander Linderman, but "expressed an opinion" that cannot be punished in a civil case.

The trial in the Riga Central District Court was notable for the fact that Linderman's lawyer, Girs, appeared at the hearing in a jacket with an October star on the lapel and the USSR coat of arms on the buttons. He also insisted on his right to speak in Russian in the Latvian court.

=== For Mother Tongue! v. Bordāns ===
In the summer of 2012, a statement was published on the website of the Latvian Ministry of Justice, in which Minister Jānis Bordāns called the party its leaders a "direct threat to democracy", accusing them of "inciting hatred and unconstitutional activities". As a result of this statement, the party demanded a retraction of the published statements, as well as compensation for moral damages in the amount of one lat. The small compensation was intended to emphasize that the moral value of the case is higher than money.

Bordāns won the case in the first instance court, but the second instance court sided with ZaRYa. This decision came into legal force, despite an attempt to challenge it in cassation.

=== Latgale Controversy ===
In 2012, the party organized a scientific conference titled "Autonomy of Latgale: Political, Legal, Economic, Historical, and Cultural Aspects." The State Security Service deemed this event as an attempt to undermine Latvia's territorial integrity. Illarion Girs, giving an explanation of the case, referred to the resolution of the Parliamentary Assembly of The Council of Europe, which states that autonomy is not a form of separatism, but an optimal form of resolving interethnic conflicts, which should be resolved on the basis of the Framework Convention for the Protection of National Minorities. He also noted that the party supports the movement of Latgale residents seeking autonomy for their region within the Republic of Latvia. Additionally, he emphasized that the Latgalian and Russian languages should be granted official status in the territory of Latgale.

== See also ==
- National Bolshevik Party
- 2012 Latvian constitutional referendum
- Russians in Latvia
- Vladimir Linderman
