= 2012 Latvian constitutional referendum =

- 18 February 2012
- Are you in favor of the adoption of the draft law "Amendments to the Constitution of the Republic of Latvia", which provides for the status of the second state language for the Russian language?

Results
Choice	Votes	%
Yes	273,347	24.96%
No	821,722	75.04%
Valid votes	1,095,069	99.68%
Invalid or blank votes	3,524	0.32%
Total votes	1,098,593	100.00%
Registered voters/turnout	1,543,786	71.16%
Results by municipality.
IN FAVOUR
100.0%—90.0%
89.9%—80.0%
79.9%—70.0%
69.9%—60.0%
59.9%—50.0%
AGAINST
50.0%—59.9%
60.0%—69.9%
70.0%—79.9%
80.0%—89.9%
90.0%—100.0%

A constitutional referendum on the "Amendments to the Constitution of the Republic of Latvia" was held on 18 February 2012. Proposed amendments included Articles 4, 18, 21, 101 and 104 of the Constitution of Latvia by adding the condition about Russian as the second official language, as well as prescribing two working languages — Latvian and Russian — for self-government institutions. The referendum's question was "Do you support the adoption of the Draft Law "Amendments to the Constitution of the Republic of Latvia" that provides for the Russian language the status of the second official language?" (Latvian: Vai Jūs esat par likumprojekta "Grozījumi Latvijas Republikas Satversmē" pieņemšanu, kas paredz krievu valodai noteikt otras valsts valodas statusu?)

According to the 2011 census, Russian was the language primarily spoken at home by 37.2% of the residents, among them 60.3% in Latgale and 55.8% in Riga. Since 2000, Russian has been regarded as a foreign language according to the Official Language Law.

== Background ==
In 2010 National Alliance started to collect signatures to force a referendum on whether all publicly financed schools would have to use exclusively Latvian as the language of tuition, managing to gather only 120,433 signatures, which was insufficient for a referendum.

The ongoing signature gathering, however, prompted the former leader of the Latvian branch of the National Bolshevik Party Vladimir Linderman, the leader of the radical-left Osipov's party Yevgeny Osipov, and the youth movement "United Latvia" to start gathering signatures for a petition of their own on making Russian a state language. On September 9, 2011 NGO "Native Language" submitted the petition to the Central Election Commission signed by 12,516 people. From November 1 to November 30, 2011, the Central Election Commission held an official signature gathering, during which 187,378 of the required 154,379 signatures were collected and the proposal was sent to Saeima. On December 22, 2011, Saeima rejected the proposal, forcing a constitutional referendum that was held on February 18, 2012.

The referendum initiators mentioned possible assimilation of minority children as the main reason to protest. One of the goals of this protest action was also to slow down the ongoing process of National Alliance signature collecting. Those initiating the referendum to make Russian co-official argued: "In such case there is no other defense method than attack. The initiator of hysteria should be shaken strongly to stop hysteria."

Legal scholars stated that beside statehood elements, the initiative would have influenced multiple basic human rights and general principles of law protected by the Constitution of Latvia, such as the right to preserve and develop the Latvian language and Latvian ethnic and cultural identity, to participate in the work of the state and of local government, and to hold a position in the civil service; the right to choose one's employment and workplace freely; the right to education; the rights of a child; and the right to equality and non-discrimination, principles of proportionality, legal certainty, and legitimate expectations.

The referendum organisers did not deny that the main achievement would be to show a large number of Russian language supporters and the final goal would be to change the status of Russian from foreign to some legal (i.e. regional) in the future. Official status for Russian was requested due to the fact that the Constitution and Official Language Law do not have any other definitions for language status other than making a language official. Amendments for granting any other status for Russian (i.e. regional) would have had a higher risk of rejection by the Constitutional Court, thus cancelling the referendum.

Organization for Security and Co-operation in Europe High Commissioner on National Minorities Knut Vollebæk planned to visit Latvia after the referendum.

== Proposed constitutional changes ==
	Current Constitution of Latvia	Proposed Constitution of Latvia
Article 4	The official language in the Republic of Latvia is the Latvian language. The flag of Latvia is red with a white stripe.	The official languages in the Republic of Latvia are Latvian and Russian languages. The flag of Latvia is red with a white stripe.
Article 18	The Saeima itself shall examine the mandates of its members. The elected person receives his mandate when during a Saeima sitting he delivers a solemn promise: "I, undertaking the duties of a member of Saeima, in front of the Latvian people swear (solemnly promise) to be loyal to Latvia, while strengthening its sovereignty and the Latvian language as the only official language of the state, defend Latvia as an independent and democratic state, fulfil my responsibilities fairly and under full consciousness. I promise to abide by the Constitution as well as the legislation of Latvia."	The Saeima itself shall examine the mandates of its members. The elected person receives his mandate when during a Saeima sitting he delivers a solemn promise: "I, undertaking the duties of a member of Saeima, in front of the Latvian people swear (solemnly promise) to be loyal to Latvia, while strengthening its sovereignty and the Latvian as well as Russian languages as the only official languages of the state, defend Latvia as an independent and democratic state, fulfil my responsibilities fairly and under full consciousness. I promise to abide by the Constitution as well as the legislation of Latvia."
Article 21	The Saeima shall draw up the rules of procedure for the regulation of its internal proceedings and order. The working language of the Saeima is the Latvian language.	The Saeima shall draw up the rules of procedure for the regulation of its internal proceedings and order.
Article 101	Every citizen of Latvia has the right, in the manner prescribed by law, to participate in the activity of the state and local governments as well as to perform state service. Local governments are elected by the citizens of Latvia and the European Union who reside in Latvia. Each citizen of the European Union, who constantly resides in Latvia, has the rights, in the manner prescribed by law, to participate in the activity of the local governments. The working language of local government is the Latvian language.	Every citizen of Latvia has the right, in the manner prescribed by law, to participate in the activity of the state and local governments as well as to perform state service. Local governments are elected by the citizens of Latvia and the European Union, who resides in Latvia. Each citizen of the European Union, who constantly resides in Latvia, has the right, in the manner prescribed by law, to participate in the activity of the local government. The working languages of local governments are Latvian and Russian languages.
Article 104	Everyone has the right, in the manner prescribed by law, to turn to the state and local government institutions with applications and to receive an answer in point of fact. Everyone has the right to receive their answer in the Latvian language.	Everyone has the right, in the manner prescribed by law, to turn to the state and local government institutions with applications and to receive an answer in point of fact. Everyone has the right to receive their answer in the Latvian and Russian languages.

== Polling stations abroad ==
A total of 85 polling stations in 41 countries — the greatest number ever — have been open outside Latvia. Besides the stations in all embassies and many consulates general and honorary consulates of Latvia, polling stations were operating in the Latvian Houses in Australia, in the Daugavas Vanagi House in London, and in the Latvian Evangelical Lutheran Churches in the United States. New polling stations were operating in Austria, Chile, Ireland, Norway, Switzerland, Venezuela, and in the British cities of Boston and Manchester, as well as the island of Guernsey.

== Campaign ==
Leader of Harmony Centre leader and Mayor of Riga Nils Ušakovs publicly declared signing the petition, despite the fact that both Harmony and Ušakovs had previously stated that they do not support it. He released a statement saying that he had been angered by National Alliance voting against the allocation of funds for such a referendum and went on to argue that it is not a move against the Latvian language, but in the name of dignity. After that other deputies, local government representatives and public officials from Harmony Centre began to sign it as well, including MP Nikolajs Kabanovs who was later issued a written warning by The Saeima Mandate, Ethics and Submissions Committee for violating the deputy's solemn vow (oath), in which Kabanov swore to strengthen the Latvian language as the only official language. Harmony MP Andrejs Klementjevs later refused to formulate his party association's official position, stating that Harmony Centre has distanced itself from the matter, however they will examine the proposal carefully should it reach the parliament.

The former presidents of Latvia Guntis Ulmanis, Vaira Vīķe-Freiberga and Valdis Zatlers, leaders of the Latvian diaspora organizations (head of the World Federation of Free Latvians Jānis Kukainis, chair of the American Latvian Association Juris Mežinskis, chair of the Latvian Association of South America and the Caribbean Daina Gūtmane; chair of the Latvian Congress of Russia Lauma Vlasova, chair of the Latvian Association of Australia and New Zealand Pēteris Strazds and chair of the Latvian National Federation in Canada Andris Ķesteris) and the leading coalition of Unity, Zatlers' Reform Party and the National Alliance all urged voters to participate in the referendum and vote against Russian as the second state language. The president at the time Andris Bērziņš initially advised people to ignore the vote gathering, dismissing it as a provocation, but when it came to a referendum also called voters not to support Russian as the second state language and said he would resign should the referendum succeed. Several notable Latvian Russians, including sculptor Gļebs Panteļejevs, stage director Mihails Gruzdovs, and journalist Marina Kosteņecka, as well as the President of Russian fraternity Fraternitas Arctica Dmitrijs Trofimovs also called for a 'no' vote.

== Opinion polls ==
According to research conducted by the Baltic Institute of Social Sciences in 2004, 51% of respondents supported or rather supported official status for Russian, 44% opposed or rather opposed it. The focus group for this research was all the inhabitants of Latvia, including Latvian non-citizens.

According to a poll performed by TNS Latvia in January 2012, 59% of citizens would vote 'no', 25% 'yes', 10% would abstain, and 6% had no opinion on the issue. According to a poll performed by Latvijas fakti in January 2012, 62.4% of citizens would vote 'no', 28% 'yes', 12.8% would abstain, and 7% had no opinion on the issue.

== Results ==
Around three-quarters of voters voted against Russian as a second national language, with only the eastern region of Latgale seeing a majority of citizens voting for the change. The referendum had considerably higher voter participation than in previous elections and referendums, with more than 71.1% of registered voters casting ballots.

Choice	Votes	%
For	273,347	24.96
Against	821,722	75.04
Total	1,095,069	100.00
Valid votes	1,095,069	99.68
Invalid/blank votes	3,524	0.32
Total votes	1,098,593	100.00
Registered voters/turnout	1,545,004	71.11
Source: CEC

=== Controversy ===
The next day after the referendum Ministry of Foreign Affairs of Russia announced that "the outcome of the referendum is far from reflecting the true mood in Latvia", pointing to around 319,000 non-citizens that could not participate in the referendum due to their status. However, if all 290,660 non-citizen members of the Russian community had participated and voted in favour of the motion, the proposal would still have been rejected with 59.15% against and 40.60% in favour, with turnout increasing to 75.68% from 71.11%.

== Analysis ==
Analysts say the turnout, at nearly 70 per cent, indicates the strength of feeling among many ordinary Latvians, who are keen to distance themselves culturally from their former Soviet rulers. The referendum can widen the schism in society and the government will have to undertake serious efforts to consolidate the country's two groups. Though the Russians who spearheaded the referendum admitted they had no chance at winning the plebiscite, they at least hope the approximate 25 per cent of support will force Latvia's centre-right government to begin a dialogue with national minorities. Many fear the disgruntled minority will keep up the pressure by calling for more referendums to change Latvia's constitution for minorities' benefit.

== See also ==
- Russian language in Latvia
- Language policy in Latvia
- Russians in Latvia
