= Russians in Latvia =

Ethnic group in Latvia

Total population
- 426,408 (2026, est.)

Regions with significant populations
- Riga, Daugavpils, Rēzekne

Religion
- Predominantly: Eastern Orthodoxy (Latvian Orthodox Church); Minority: Old Believers

Russians have been the largest ethnic minority in Latvia for the last two centuries. The number of Russians in Latvia more than quadrupled during the Soviet occupation of Latvia when the size of the community grew from 8.8% of the total population in 1935 (206,499) to 34.0% in 1989 (905,515). It started to decrease in size again after Latvia regained independence in 1991 falling to 23.1% at the beginning of 2026. (Note: excluding the unknown population)

== Ancient Latvia ==
The Latvian word krievi for "Russians" and Krievija for "Russia" (and Krievzeme for Ruthenia) is thought to have originated from Krivichs, one of the tribal unions of Early East Slavs. During the 11th–12th centuries, Jersika and Koknese, principalities in Eastern Latvia paid tribute to the Principality of Polatsk.

== Livonia ==
Koknese was taken by the Livonian Brothers of the Sword in 1208 and Jersika in 1209 and later both incorporated into Terra Mariana (Livonia).

=== Early trade ===
East Slavic presence remained, primarily as merchants in cities; trading ties to Muscovy and other parts of what is now Russia were preserved as well. The merchants of Novgorod Republic established trade relations with the Hanseatic League, of which Riga was a member, and with merchants through the Riga Merchant Guild. Nevertheless, Russian prospects for profit remained limited in the German-dominated trade league, including economic blockades preventing Novgorod from trading with Livonia. Circumstances changed in 1392, when under the "Nyborg agreement", it was agreed that German and Russian merchants would enjoy the freedom of movement. Russian trade contributed significantly to the development of Livonia over the following century.

=== Regional power struggles ===
In 1481, Ivan III of Russia briefly captured Dünaburg castle in southeastern Livonia in response to a Livonian attack on north-west Russia. During the Livonian War Russian tsar Ivan the Terrible captured several castles and towns in Eastern Latvia and held some of them even for 4 years.

From the second half of the seventeenth century religiously repressed Old Believers from Russia settled in Latgale which was part of Polish–Lithuanian Commonwealth.

In the 17th century, during Russo-Swedish War initiated by Alexis I of Russia, the Russians seized much of eastern Latgale, renamed Dünaburg into Borisoglebsk and controlled the region for 11 years between 1656 and 1667. Russia had to yield the area to Poland following the Treaty of Andrusovo.

=== Consolidation under Russian rule ===
Count Sheremetev's capture of Riga in the Great Northern War in 1710 completed Peter I's conquest of Swedish Livonia. Russian trade through Latvia began to flourish and an active Russian merchant class began to settle in Latvia. The first Russian school in Riga was founded in 1789. Latgale was incorporated into the Russian Empire after the first Partition of Poland in 1772, Kurzeme and Zemgale were (Duchy of Courland and Semigallia) in 1795.

The Russian capital was invested in trade through the Baltic countries, including Latvia. Some of those profits went toward establishing a Russian-owned industry. By the middle of the 19th century, the developing industry began to attract Russian workers. The influx of Russian peasantry had also continued, seeking less socially and religiously oppressive conditions within the empire owing to the certain degree of autonomy accorded the Baltic provinces, which were not subject to all the same laws as the rest of the Russian Empire. While the Russian nobility also established a presence, administrative control remained in the hands of the Baltic Germans.

=== Latvian National Awakening ===
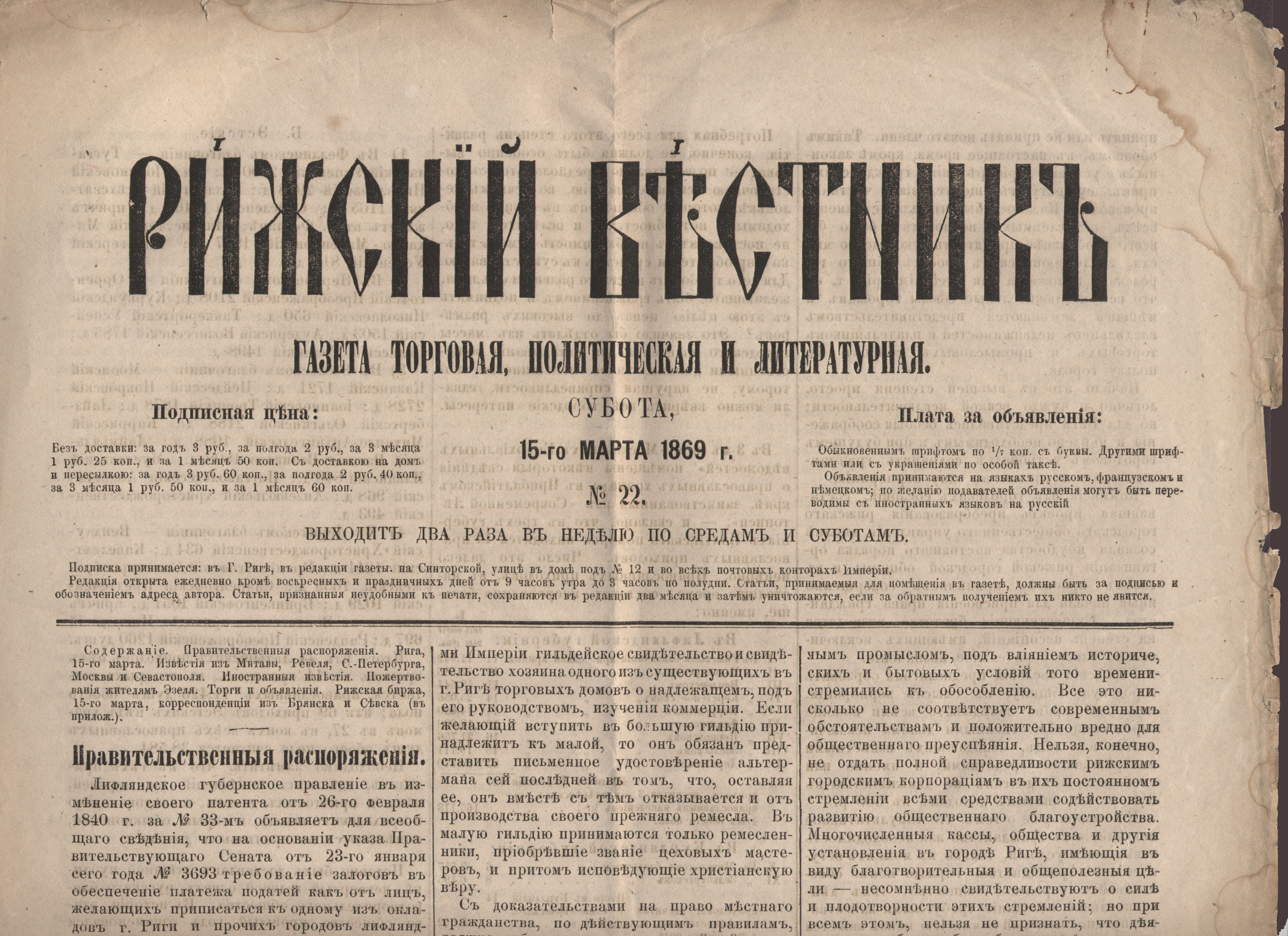
Рижский Вестник (Riga Herald) issue no. 22 of March 15, 1869

While the Russian community in Latvia was largely an extension of Russia's ethnic Russians, it nevertheless also began to develop a sense of community separate from Russia itself, Latvian Russians were beginning to consider themselves one of the nationalities of Latvia. Russian social organizations began to spring up in the 1860s, around the same time as that of the Latvian National Awakening. The reforms of Alexander II, including the abolition of serfdom in 1861 throughout the rest of the empire, further stimulated the rise of national consciousness.

Latvia had, in fact, taken a lead in this regard, as serfdom had already been abolished in 1819 except for Latgale, which had been incorporated into the Vitebsk Guberniya in 1802. The first Russian newspaper in Riga –Rossiyskoe ezhenedelnoe izdanie v Rige (Российское еженедельное издание в Риге, Russian Weekly in Riga) – was founded in 1816. The Russian daily newspaper Rizhskij Vestnik (Рижский Вестник, "Riga Herald"), founded in 1869 by Evgraf Vasilyevich Cheshikhin (Евграф Васильевич Чешихин) and published until his death in 1888, established the notion of "the needs and wants of the local Russian population". Cheshikhin also formed the Russian literary circle (Русский литературный кружок) in Riga in 1876. Local Russians participated in elections to town councils and later to the State Duma.

=== Decline and end of empire ===
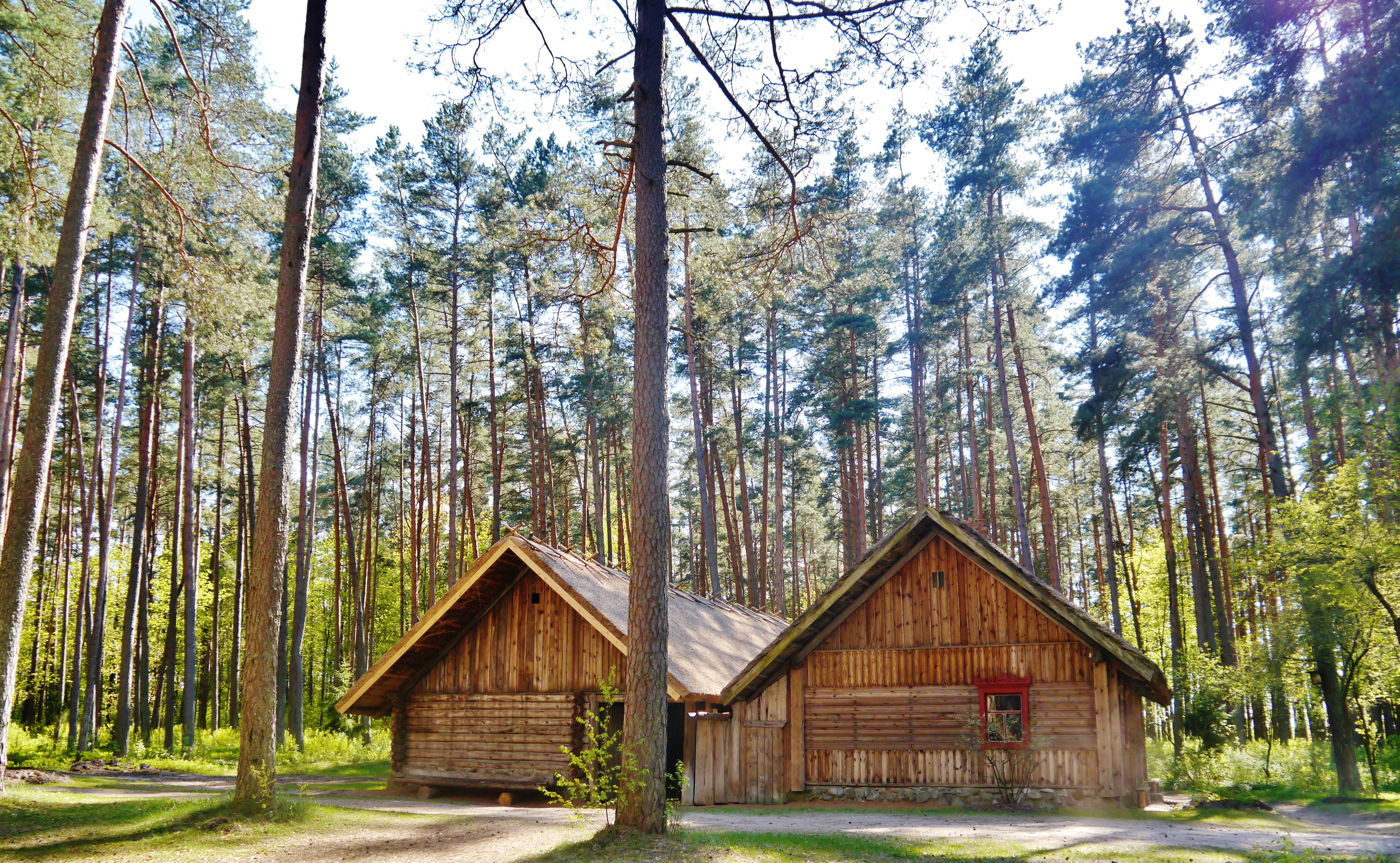
Russian peasant's house built in the second half of the 19th century in Jekimāni village, Rēzekne district, Latgale, partially reconstructed in 1920 and currently located at The Ethnographic Open-Air Museum of Latvia

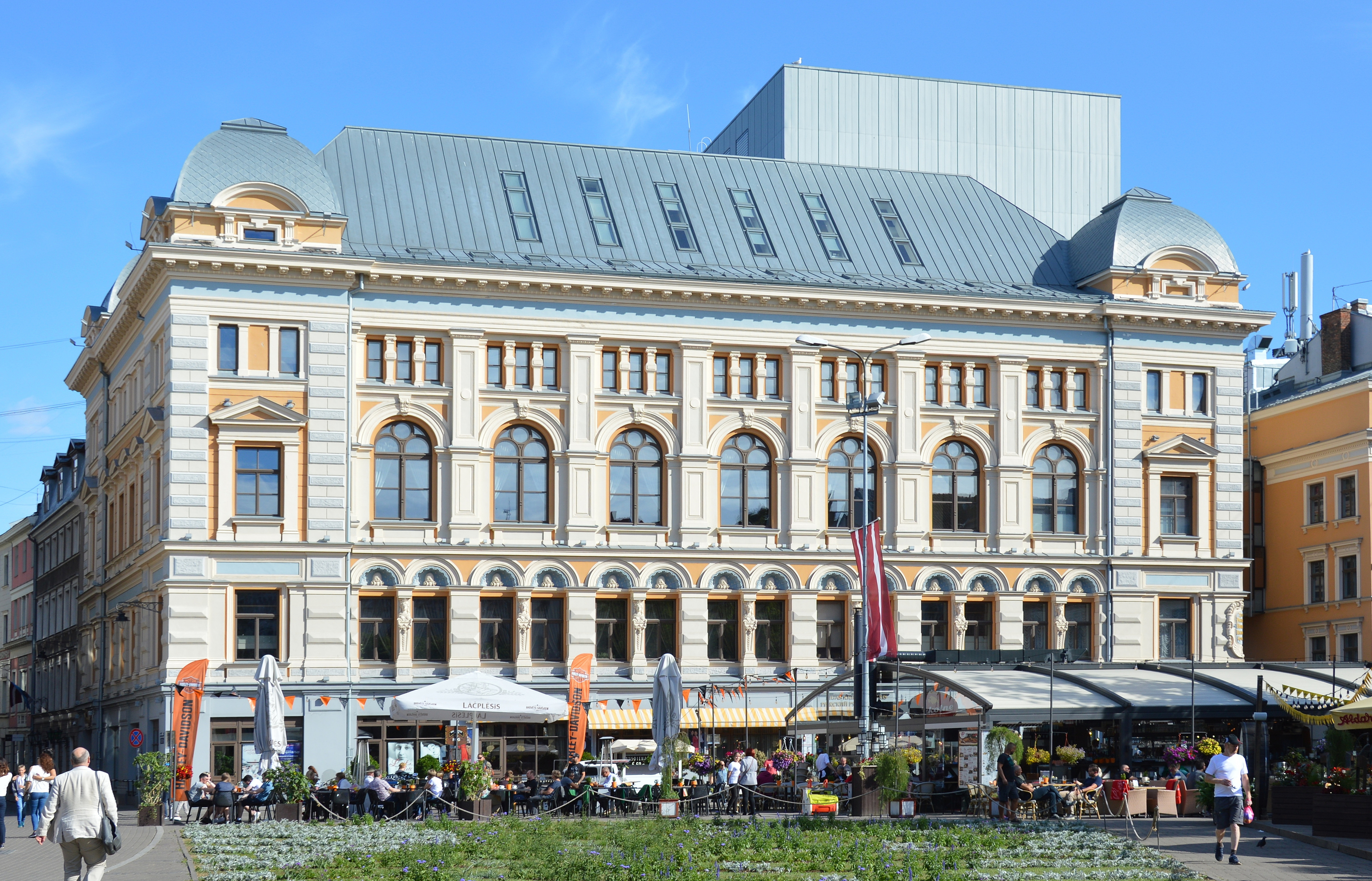
Mikhail Chekhov Riga Russian Theatre founded in 1883

At the dawn of the 20th century, Russians made up a notable part of the working population in the biggest industrial cities. In Latvia, as in the rest of the Russian empire, the situation of factory workers was grim. They worked on average 11 hours a day, 10 on Saturday, and this under harsh and unsafe conditions. Social agitation built up over the course of several years; when workers protested at the Winter Palace, police and Cossacks attacked the procession, killing or wounding hundreds. This event marked the start of the Revolution of 1905.

When the revolution spread to Latvia, instead of frustration or class struggle, the adversary in Latvia was unambiguously the Baltic German elite: a separate social class of separate ethnicity speaking a separate language. Thus the 1905 revolution in Latvia was fundamentally different from that in the rest of Russia. Peasants of both Russian and Latvian ethnicity captured small towns and burned dozens of manors. The revolution in Latvia, however, did not agitate to separate from Russia, as nationalists continued to believe they needed the might of Imperial Russia to counter Baltic German dominance.

At the conclusion of the 1905 Revolution, Nicholas II, through various concessions, including the establishment of the representative Duma, retained power. Although Russification as a policy was not withdrawn, the Baltic German elite once again found themselves in the Tsar's favor as his agent to maintain control. The Germans, assisted by regiments of the Russian Army, targeted Latvians in an attempt to counter nationalism. The Russian government, in re-allying itself with the ruling elite, sought to cement that relationship by encouraging Russian political leaders to ally themselves with the Germans against the Latvians. The sentiment of the Latvian Russian community, however, remained ambivalent. The majority were descendants from Old Believers who had fled to the Baltics to escape religious persecution – and still regarded the tsar with deep suspicion, if not as outright evil. They now tended to remain neutral in the confrontation between Baltic Germans and nationalist Latvians; but in doing so the active commonality of purpose between Latvian Russians, Latvians, and Latvian nationalists prior to the 1905 Revolution was dissolved. Latvian nationalism continued to be focused against the Baltic Germans, a position unchanged until the Revolution of 1917.

In 1917, class consciousness had continued to develop and was particularly strong in heavily industrialized Riga, the second-largest port in Russia. The Latvian Riflemen were particularly active and instrumental, assisting in organizing urban workers and rural peasants, in confiscating estates, and in setting up soviets in place of former local councils. This, however, presented a new issue for the Latvian nationalists. Based on the historical special status the Baltics had enjoyed since Peter I, they had hoped for more autonomy, yet not seceding from Russia. Bolshevism now threatened to swallow up nationalism and thus became the new enemy. A new, more ethnic, strident, nationalism, defined as throwing off both German and Russian influences, accompanied the turn against Bolshevism. It did not, however, target the Latvian Russian population, nor did it target the influx of Russians who fled to Latvia after 1917 to escape the Soviet Russia.

=== Demographics ===
By the end of the 19th century, there was a considerably large Latvian Russian population. According to the first All-Russia Census of 1897, it totaled 171,000, distributed as follows: 77,000 Latgale, 68,000 Vidzeme, and 26,000 in Kurzeme and Zemgale. The urban population was roughly twice that of the rural, with the exception of Latgale, where those proportions were reversed.

Half of the Russian population of Vidzeme, Kurzeme and Zemgale came from the nearby provinces of Russia. In the Rēzekne district of Latgale, for example, 10% of Russians had come from other provinces. The largest number of newcomers came from the neighbouring provinces of the Empire – those of Kaunas, Vitebsk and Vilnius.

In their social structure, Russians differed from most other nationalities in Latvia. The largest social group among them were peasants (54%), and they made up the majority of Russians in Latgale. The middle class made up 35% and hereditary and personal noblemen (aristocracy) made up 8%. As far as their group characteristics are concerned, Russians were much like the Latvian Poles but differed from the Latvians who were mainly peasants and from the Germans who belonged mainly to the middle class or nobility.

== In independent Latvia (1918–1940) ==
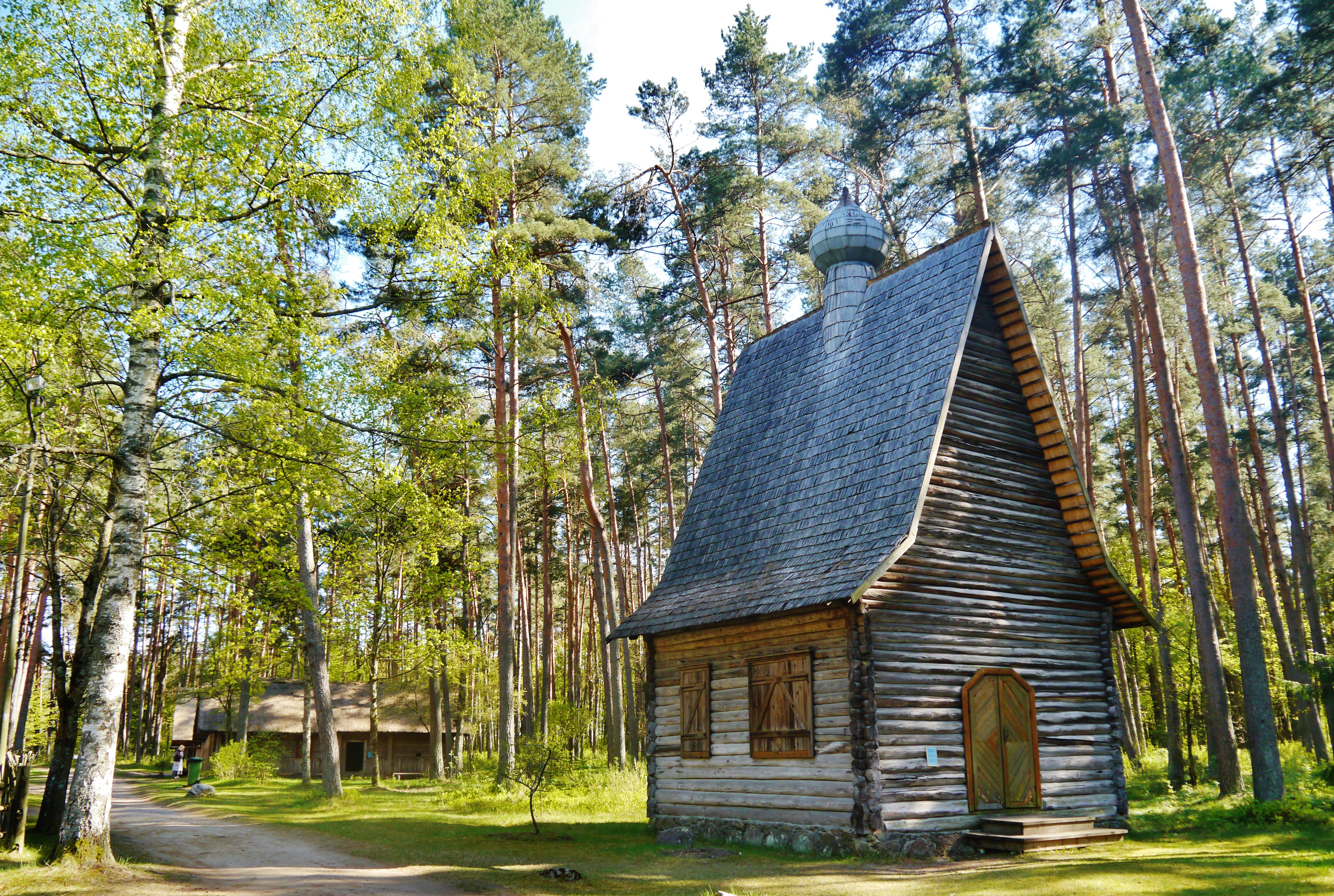
Russian Orthodox church built in 1930s in Rogovka, Rēzekne Municipality, Latgale, currently located at The Ethnographic Open-Air Museum of Latvia

On November 18, 1918, the Republic of Latvia was proclaimed as an independent democratic state. All the nationalities who lived in the territory of Latvia in the period of foreign rule had the opportunity to develop as national minorities of the country. All Russians lost the status of their ethnic belonging to the Empire, but in Latvia, they were given all the rights normally secured by democratic states.

The years of independent Latvia were favourable to the growth of the Russian national group. Not only in the whole of Latvia but in all the historical regions of the country the number of this national minority grew constantly.

According to the first statistical data of 1920, the number of the Russian population at that time was 91,000. In 1935 the number of the Russian minority had increased up to 206,000. During the whole period of independence, Russians remained the biggest national minority of the country. In 1935, the part of Russians in the whole structure of the population of Latvia made up 10.5% (in 1920 – 7.8%).

The growth of the Russian population was due to several factors. The Civil war and the establishment of Soviet power in Russia caused a flow of refugees and emigrants to many countries, Latvia included. After the Battle of Daugavpils in 1920 Poles relinquished control of Dvinsk with the majority of the Russian population to the Latvians. According to the Peace Treaty between the Latvian Republic and Soviet Russia, some lands of the Pskov province with a large number of Russians passed on to Latvia. But the main cause of the Russian population growth was their high natural birth rate. For example, in 1929 the natural increment of Russians was 2,800, while the natural increment of Latvians, whose total number in that same year was nine times as big as that of Russians, made up only 3,700.

Russians used to have the biggest number of large families in comparison with other national groups of Latvia. As in the tsarist times, Russians still remained one of the "youngest" ethnic groups of Latvia. The Russian children aged under fourteen made up 14% of the total number of children of Latvia of the same age. Russian families during the period of independence were characterised by very high stability. The average number of divorces of Russian families was half that of Latvian families and one fifth that of German families.

Big changes took place in the structure of the territorial settlement of Russians in Latvia. Three-quarters of the Russian population lived in Latgale, 14% in Riga.

In comparison with the tsarist period of the history of Latvia, Russians acquired more "country and agricultural" features and lost those of "town and industry". The overwhelming majority of Russians were engaged in agriculture (80%). 7% were engaged in industry, 4.9% – in trade. The fact that Russian inhabitants of the country had their farms mainly in Latgale, the least economically developed part of the country, did not stimulate them to social movement towards prestigious kinds of labour and agriculture. In the towns of Vidzeme, Kurzeme, and Zemgale the social picture of Russians approached the all-Latvian one. But even there, Russians did not belong to economically and socially advanced national groups. Russians differed from Latvians, Germans and Jews by a smaller part of property owners and widespread use of child labour.

The total level of literacy of the Russian population at the very beginning of the history of the Latvian Republic was lower than at the time of the Empire. Only 42% of Russian men and 28% of Russian women of Latvia could read and write in 1920. During the years of independence, the number of Russian pupils at schools increased greatly (1.5 times – the highest rate in the period of 1925–1935). As a result, the difference between the number of Latvian and Russian students aged 6–20 was reduced considerably (54% and 47% correspondingly).

Russians were underrepresented in institutions of higher education. In 1920 there were only 65 Russian students at the University of Latvia, in 1939 – 220 students.

For a long time, the Latvian Republic tried to integrate the Russian minority on the basis of a large national-cultural autonomy. National schools of Latvia widely used their right to teach children in their mother tongue. Russian schools were not an exception. The Russian language played a particularly important role at the stage of primary education. By the end of the 1920s, 92% of Russian children were being educated at Russian primary schools. The development of the network of secondary schools also took into account the demands of national minorities to receive education in their own language. At the end of the 1920s and the beginning of the 1930s, there was an increasing tendency by parents from minority groups to send their children to Latvian language schools. In 1935 60% of Russian children were educated in their mother tongue.

The popularity of the Russian language in Latvia resulted from the fact that Russians did not generally seek to learn the Latvian or other minority languages.

The Latvian language was not attractive to the Russian population of Latvia. In 1920–1930 only a little more than 15% of Russians could speak and write Latvian. The Latvian milieu of many towns was a good incentive for Russians to learn the Latvian language. 70% of Russian residents of Jelgava and more than 80% of those of Bauska, Valmiera and Kuldīga spoke Latvian.

=== Political life and consciousness ===
The establishment of the Latvian State, on November 18, 1918, made local Russians determine new principles in their relations with the government. Under the new conditions, the Russians of Latvia became a national minority whose special cultural interests were regulated by the Law on the Cultural-National Autonomy of Minorities, adopted by the People's Council of Latvia.

Russians enjoyed full rights as Latvian citizens and therefore, took part in the political life of the country. Russians, as a national minority, participated in the elections to the Constituent Assembly of Latvia and to all the four Saeimas.

From two to six per cent of all Latvian electors voted for Russian parties. In those areas highly populated by Russians (Riga and Latgale) Russian electors increasingly voted for Russian parties during the whole period of the parliamentary state.

Specific historical conditions determined the attitude of Russians towards the idea of national-cultural autonomy. They accepted the autonomous character of Russian culture with respect to Latvian culture but believed there was no specific local autonomy with respect to Russian culture and Russian people in general. Local Russian society did not identify any special features characteristic of local Russians which would differentiate them from the Russians of Russia.

During the period of the Latvian Republic, the local Russian inhabitants tried to work out their own principles of social consciousness. At the beginning of the Republic, 1918–1919, the orthodox wing (N. Bordonos) of the National Democratic League (NDL, the first Russian national union of Riga and then of the whole of Latvia) spoke in favour of the ethnic purity of Russian social organizations. The liberal wing of the NDL, and later the Russian Society of Latvia (N. Berejanski, S. Mansyrev), called for a close co-operation with the whole of Latvian society.

From the liberal consciousness of the NDL there emerged some elements of a specific ideology among part of the Russian population of Latvia – "democratic nationalism". Its mouthpiece was the publicist Berejanski. He thought that the fate of the Russians of Latvia was not easy. Their historical motherland was in the hands of "Bolshevik internationalism", the enemy of Russian national culture and ethics. Russians were grateful to democratic Latvia for granting the opportunity to develop their culture. But Russians themselves, N.Berejanski thought, had to strengthen to the utmost, within their consciousness, the notion of national values. The followers of this idea worked on the Russian newspaper "Slovo" ("Word"). At the same time the most famous Russian newspaper Segodnia did not pretend to propagate Russian national ideas, but advocated the ideas of a defence of the cultural-national autonomy of all local minorities.

A flamboyant exponent of Russian national principles was N. Belotsvelov, who considered that the conversion of Russians to nationalism was a natural result of the fate of emigrants fearing for the future of their culture.

The ideas of "democratic nationalism" were supported by the leaders of the Russian Peasants Union which had a right-wing orientation. The RPU became the basis of the Russian Peasant fraction of three deputies in the Fourth Saeima.

A part of Latvia's Russians belonged to the ultra-left of the political spectrum. In the Fourth Saeima, one Russian represented the social democrats and one Russian was a communist representative. But the Russian left-wing parties did not achieve any big success though they had a certain influence among sections of the workers of Riga. In general, the Russian minority was less politically active than the Jewish and Baltic German minorities.

== In Soviet Latvia (1940–1990) ==
=== 1940–1941 ===
In the summer of 1940, Latvia lost its independence and was occupied by the USSR.

The attitude of the Russian minority towards these events varied. Three kinds of positions can be discerned:

1. Complete disagreement with the Bolshevik regime: characteristic of the Russian intelligentsia and priests
2. Part of the Russian public of Latvia was under an illusion regarding Joseph Stalin's dictatorship, hoping that it would turn into a political system similar to that of the Russian monarchy
3. Full support for the Bolshevik regime

During one year of Soviet power, local Russians were deprived of all their national periodicals, and many of their prominent public figures were subjected to repression or killed. But the new regime also found supporters among local Russians. Collective farms emerged in Latvia and there were a large number of Russians in the security services and units of the workers' guard. The communist nomenclature was being rapidly developed, with local Russians taking an active part in it.

=== 1941–1944 ===
In 1941, Nazi Germany invaded the USSR, and subsequently occupied the territory of Latvia. In Soviet times, this period was known as the Great Patriotic War, a term that retains resonance with the Russian community of Latvia today.

A part of the local Russian population chose to resist the invaders by serving in the Red Army and in the partisan movement, and supporting the underground Communist Party.

But, at the same time, there were quite a number of Russians collaborating with the Nazi authorities. They worked on the newspapers propagandising the myth of "a national Russia" free of Bolsheviks and Jews, and "the liberating mission" of the Wehrmacht. Russians were won over to militarised units. The Nazis made advances to those of the Russian population who had suffered from the Bolsheviks. The newspapers of that time were full of information about Russian national culture. In Daugavpils a Russian theatre was opened, at the Rēzekne Teachers' Institute, a Russian-language class for teachers of Russian, was set up.

An institution was created to represent the interests of the Russian population in the Generalgebiet of Latvia, as well as the Russian Committee for the Affairs of the Russian population of Latvia. These were designed to help Russians with some of their economic, cultural and legal needs.

=== Post-war migration ===
After Latvians, the Russians are the largest ethnic group in today's Latvia. In 1989 this national group made up 34.0% of the population of Latvia, its total number 905,500. In comparison with the demographic situation of the pre-war period, the number of Russians had increased 4.5 times. Their relative share in the national composition of Latvia had increased 3.5 times. The majority of the Russian national group in Latvia today are a result of migration from other republics of the USSR, mainly from the Russian Federation.

Russians settled mostly in towns rather than in the country. They tended to choose larger cities such as Riga and Daugavpils. Russians differed from Latvians in their professional characteristics. Over one-third of the Russian population were engaged in industry (one-quarter of Latvians), 7% of Russians (22% of Latvians) were engaged in agriculture, 1% of Russians (2.5% of Latvians) in the sphere of culture and art.

Russians were the main ethnic group in the USSR both in number and in political influence. Under the conditions of Soviet Latvia, Russian culture dominated the whole non-Latvian population of the Republic. The Russian language also formed a new group of Russian-speaking Belarusians, Ukrainians, Poles, Jews and Germans of Latvia. In the period of 1959–1979 the number of ethnic Russians in Latvia increased by 47%, but the number of non-Russians considering Russian their mother tongue increased by 78%. A highly developed infrastructure was developed in Latvia on the basis of the Russian language: a broad system of secondary and higher education, science and mass media.

=== National consciousness ===
During the whole Soviet period, the Russian (as did the Latvian) mass media of Latvia played the part of active bearers of the communist ideology, influencing the consciousness of the Russians of Latvia.

For the whole Soviet period, there was no agreed-upon formula at the official level to express the national-cultural identity of this large group of Latvian residents. The ideology of the Communist Party rejected the tradition of the Latvian Republic which identified the Russians of Latvia as one of its national minorities. In the USSR there existed a form of national-territorial autonomy of nations, though not for all nations, which made their social representation in the state bodies unequal. As a result, their influence on the social consciousness was unequal as well. A nation could only be considered "fully-fledged" if it possessed a state system in the form of a union republic. Therefore, there was only one recognized nation in Latvia – Latvians. The Russians of Latvia, both those who had deep historical roots there and those who chose it as a place of permanent residence after World War II, having no territorial autonomy, were not considered as an individual cultural and national community in the Latvian Republic but rather as part of the larger Russian community of the Soviet Union.

At the end of the 1980s, the first marked democratic changes in the USSR brought about a national awakening of peoples. New democratic tendencies gave equal chances to the national revival of both Latvians and Russians. Some Russians, both as individuals and organized groups, actively supported the Latvian national awakening, the "Atmoda".

In July 1988, A. Maltsev was one of the 17 prominent figures of Latvian culture who signed an open letter to the Broadened Assembly of the Latvian Writers League with the initiative of establishing a democratic People's Front. The idea of establishing a Popular Front of Latvia was supported by Russian writers of the Republic such as Ludmila Azarova, Roald Dobrovenski, Vladlen Dozortsev and Marina Kostenetskaya, the journalists Alexei Grigoriev, A. Kazakov, the translator and bibliographer Yuri Abyzov, and many others. In 1989 L. Gladkov, V. Dozortsev, V. Zhdanov, V. Kononov and Kostenetskaya were elected to the Council of the Popular Front of Latvia. Dozortsev became a member of the Board of the Council of the Popular Front of Latvia. Grigoriev was one of the editors of "Atmoda" – the newspaper of the PFL. The circulation of the Russian edition of "Atmoda" was quite large (15–100 thousand). It was popular not only with the Russian residents of Latvia but with the Western-minded public of Russia as well.

The PFL became the basis of consolidation of the Russian Culture Society of Latvia (RCSL). The Constituent Assembly of the RCSL was held on March 4, 1989. The aim of the Society was "to develop to the utmost the Russian national culture, to intensify traditional Russian–Latvian relations, and cooperate with the representatives of all nationalities of the Republic".

At the same time, quite a number of the Russians of Latvia viewed the revival of the Latvian state system with mistrust. This is shown by the results of a public opinion poll in 1989. Only 49% of the non-Latvian population supported the idea of the independence of Latvia (the number of Latvians supporting the idea made up 93%). The International Front of the Working People of Latvia or Interfront, established in 1989, came out openly for remaining in the Soviet Union and preserving a socialist economy. Interfront aimed to win the sympathies of those Russians who were opposed to the idea of Latvia as a national state.

== In independent Latvia (1990–present) ==
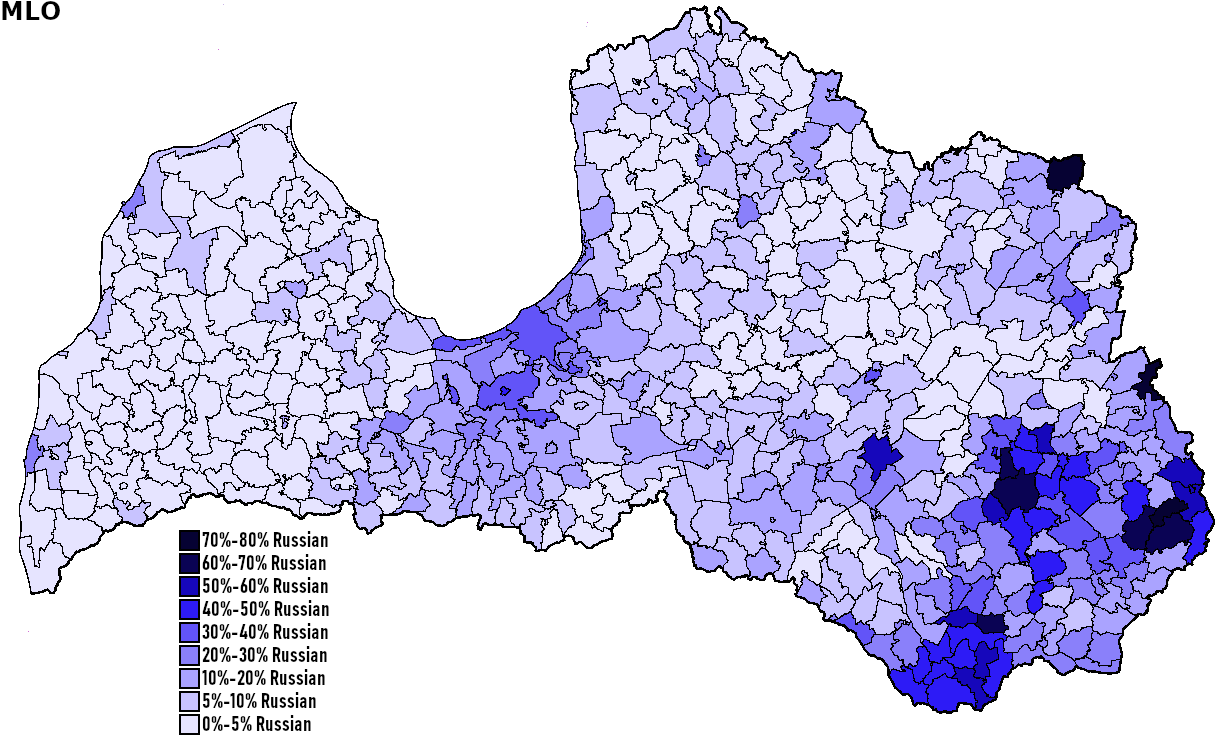
Russians in Latvia in 2024

=== Distribution ===
Percentage distribution of ethnic Russians in Latvia and other Baltic states (2021)

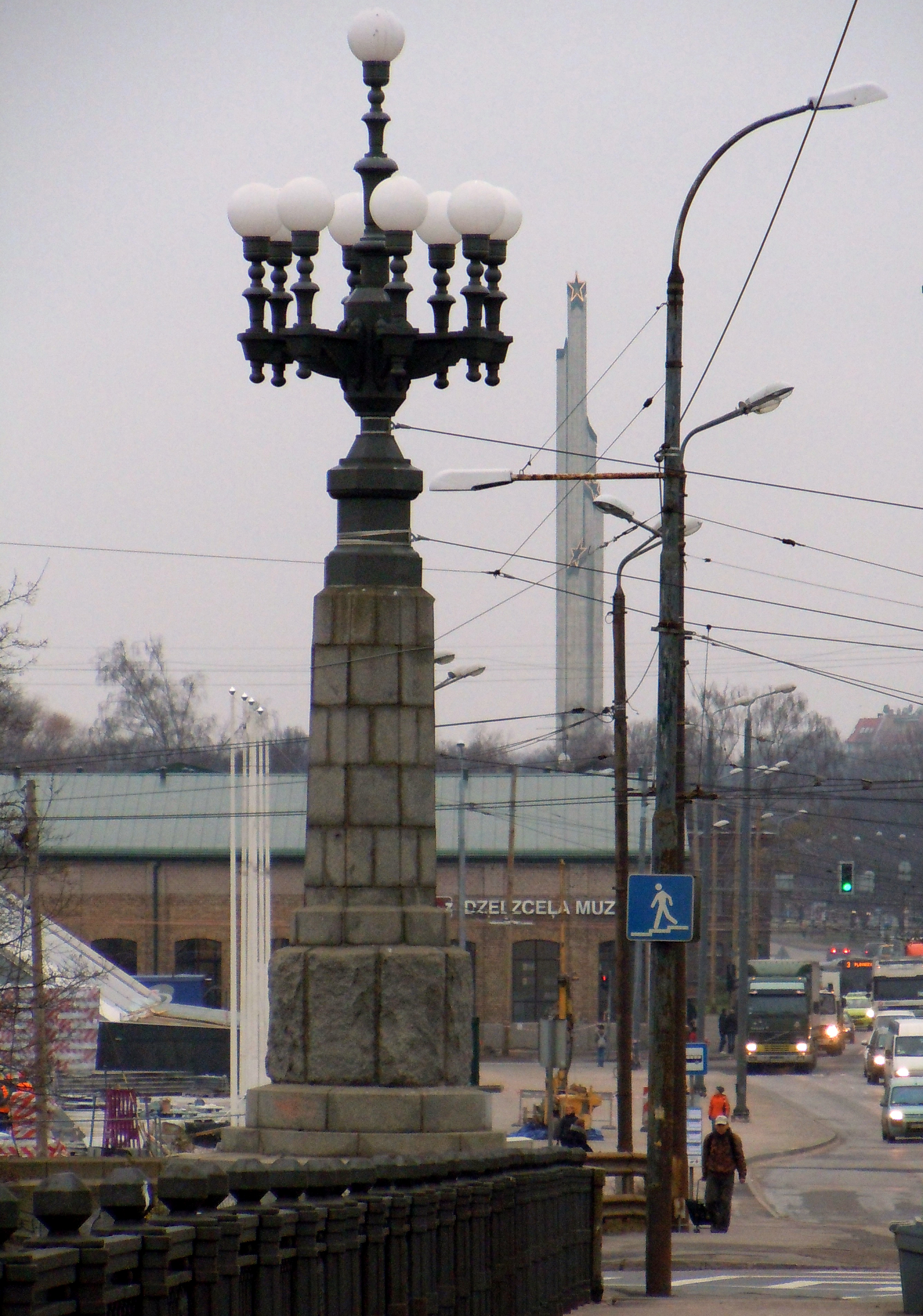
The demolishment of a huge Soviet monument in Riga (seen in the distance) in 2022 angered ethnic Russians

Russians in Latvia live mainly in urban areas. In 2006 Russians made up 42.3% of the population in the capital Riga and 53.5% in the second largest city, Daugavpils (not counting others with Russian as mother tongue). Under the Soviet Union, arriving Russians had been settled primarily in industrial centres to staff factory jobs while rural areas remained populated almost entirely by ethnic Latvians, except for some small areas in eastern Latvia with a longer history of Russian-Latvian mixed villages. In the beginning of 2025, ethnic Russians made up 24.1% of the population.

According to Central Statistical Bureau of Latvia 19,932 Russians migrated to Latvia from 2011 to 2017, while 48,851 Russians emigrated to other countries.

=== Citizenship ===
After re-establishing independence in 1991, Latvia did not automatically grant citizenship to anyone whose forebears arrived after June 1940, a policy that mainly affected ethnic Russians. Knowledge of Latvian language and history was set as a condition for obtaining citizenship; these initial conditions have been relaxed thereafter. However, a significant number of Russians in Latvia still have alien status. As of January 2022, the majority of Latvia's ethnic Russians, 66.5% or 302,230 persons, had citizenship.

Anyone who legally (according to Soviet law) gained a residence in Latvia before the summer of 1992 was able to claim that residence upon Latvian independence, even if that legal basis included Soviet confiscation of property. Returning property owners seeking to reclaim their possessions were compensated with equal land elsewhere, with no recourse to reclaim the particular property itself, or with certificates which could be used as discount coupons in acquiring shares in privatized properties. The Latvian government also pays pensions to all resident retirees regardless of ethnicity or citizenship or non-citizen status.

=== Russian language ===
Another issue of contention for some Russians and Russian speakers in Latvia (most notably Social Democratic Party "Harmony", Latvian Russian Union, Headquarters for the Protection of Russian Schools and For the Native Language!) is the status of the Russian language, as Latvian is defined by the Constitution and the Law on State Language as the only official language in Latvia.

On February 18, 2012, Latvia held a constitutional referendum on whether to adopt Russian as a second official language. 74.8% voted against, 24.9% voted for and the voter turnout was 71.1%.

Beginning in 2019, instruction in Russian language will be gradually discontinued in private colleges and universities, as well as general instruction in public high schools, except for subjects related to culture and history of the Russian minority, such as Russian language and literature classes.

=== Political representation ===
There are several politicians and political parties in Latvia who claim to represent the Russian-speaking minority. These include the Latvian Russian Union which has one seat in the European Parliament held by Tatjana Ždanoka, and the Harmony party with two seats held by Nils Ušakovs and Andris Ameriks. These political parties support Russian language rights, the granting of automatic citizenship to all non-citizens of Latvia and tend to be conservative on social issues, but left-wing on economic issues.

Several politicians of Russian ethnicity also have held high ranking governmental positions in Latvia, such as Vladimirs Makarovs who was the Minister for Welfare of Latvia and the Minister of Environmental Protection and Regional Development, Vjačeslavs Dombrovskis who served as the Minister for Education and Science of Latvia and the Minister of Economics. and Nils Ušakovs who was the Mayor of Riga from 2009 to 2019.

== Notable Russians from Latvia ==
Noteworthy Russians from Latvia include:

- Valerian Abakovsky, engineer who is best known as the inventor of the Aerowagon
- Mikhail Baryshnikov, Russian-American dancer and actor, born in Riga
- Ludmilla Chiriaeff (1924–1996), ballet dancer, choreographer, and director, born in Riga
- Mikhail Eisenstein (1867–1921), architect, designed a number of buildings on Albert Street in Riga, father of Sergei Eisenstein
- Ivan Fomin (1872–1936), architect and educator, received a classical education at a high school in Riga
- Anatolijs Gorbunovs, first Russian to hold the office of the Speaker of the Saeima, born in Pilda Parish
- Aleksandr Kaleri, Russian cosmonaut, born in Jūrmala
- Veniamin Kaverin, writer, grew up Rēzekne
- Jevgenija Lisicina, organist and compilator from Riga
- Marija Golubeva, minister of interior (2021-2022)
- Marija Naumova (Marie N), winner of the 2002 Eurovision Song Contest for Latvia
- Vera Mukhina (1889–1953), Soviet sculptor
- Vladimirs Petrovs, chess player, born in Riga
- Aleksandrs Petukhovs, movie writer and director, born in Riga
- Lev Rudnev (1885–1956), architect, and a leading practitioner of Stalinist architecture, graduated from the Riga Realschule (now the Riga 1st State Grammar School)
- Alexander Shabalov, chess player
- Alexei Shirov, chess grandmaster born in Riga
- Konstantin Sokolsky, singer from Riga
- Ksenia Solo, actress
- Anatoly Solovyev, pilot and cosmonaut, born in Riga
- Viktor Tikhonov, Soviet ice hockey coach, born in Riga
- Nils Ušakovs, first Russian to hold the office of mayor of Riga in independent Latvia
- Mikhail Zadornov, satirist, born in Jūrmala
- Sergejs Žoltoks, ice hockey player from Riga
- Vitaliy Grachev, singer, born in Daugavpils.

== See also ==
- Latvia–Russia relations
- Baltic Russians
- Ethnic Russians in post-Soviet states
- Latvians in Russia

== Literature ==
- This article incorporates information from The Latvian Institute fact sheet about Russians in Latvia, with permission
- The Latvian Legation, Facts about Latvia, 1944
- "Project: Attitudes of the Major Soviet Nationalities," Latvia, Demography – Center for International Studies at M.I.T., 1973
- Sovetskaya Latviya, June 23, 1971
- Data from the Central Statistical Bureau of Latvia
- The New York Times, April 7, 1995; Foreign Desk article (Russian troops in Latvia 7 months after Russian withdrawal)
- Russians in the Baltics: Full-right members of society or not?
- Russian FM Lashes out at Latvia Over “Profanation” of Russian Minority Rights, Moscow News, May 27, 2005
- Latvian lessons irk Russians at BBC News
- Citizenship row divides Latvia at BBC News
- BBC Journalist Perpetuates Lies About Latvia – Latvian news article responding to above two BBC News stories, translation on Talk page
- Latvia: Treatment of ethnic Russians; whether ethnic Russians face discrimination; availability of state protection (January 2004 - December 2005) Immigration and Refugee Board of Canada 2006
- Russia and nation-state building in Latvia
