= Qaradağlı =

Qaradağlı or Karadagly may refer to:

- Qaradağlı, Agdam, Azerbaijan
- Qaradağlı (Qasımlı), Agdam, Azerbaijan
- Qaradağlı, Agdash, Azerbaijan
- Qaradağlı, Barda, Azerbaijan
- Qaradağlı, Beylagan, Azerbaijan
- Qaradağlı, Fuzuli, Azerbaijan
- Qaradağlı, Goranboy, Azerbaijan
- Qaradağlı, Khachmaz, Azerbaijan
- Qaradağlı, Khojavend, Azerbaijan
- Qaradağlı, Shaki, Azerbaijan
- Qaradağlı, Tartar, Azerbaijan
- Qaradağlı, Ujar, Azerbaijan
- Yuxarı Qaradağlı, Azerbaijan

== See also ==
- Qaradağ (disambiguation)
