= Kara Dag =

Kara Dag or Qara Dag (Dag/Dağ/Dagh, occasionally Daq or Tagh) is Oghuz Turkic for "Black Mountain". It may be written as one word (Karadag), a hyphenated word (Kara-dag), or as two words (Kara Dag). Any of these spellings may refer to:

== People ==
- Fikri Karadağ (born 1953), Turkish army colonel indicted for treason

== Places ==
=== Azerbaijan ===
- Qaradağlı, Ağdam or Qaradağ, Azerbaijan
- Qaradağ, Agsu, a village and municipality in the Agsu District, Azerbaijan
- Qaradağ raion, a village and district near Baku, Azerbaijan
- Qaradağ, Gadabay, a village and municipality in the Gadabay District, Azerbaijan
- Qaradaş or Qaradağ, a village and municipality in the Tovuz District, Azerbaijan

=== Iran ===
- Qara Daq, East Azarbaijan or Arasbaran, a mountain range in Iran
- Qarrah Dagh, Zanjan, a village in Golabar, Ijrud County, Iran

=== Turkey ===
- Mount Karadağ, an extinct volcano in Turkey
- Karadağ, Kaş, a village in Antalya Province, Turkey
- Karadağ, Çan
- Karadağ, Ezine
- Karadağ, Kemah
- Karadağ, Narman

=== Ukraine ===
- Karadag Mountain, also known as Qaradağ or Kara-Dag, an extinct volcano in Crimea

=== Elsewhere ===
- Montenegro, the state or province, known as Karadağ under the Ottoman Empire and in Turkish language as the country name
- Skopska Crna Gora, formerly known as Kara-dagh or Karadag, a mountain range north of Skopje, Macedonia, Kosovo and Serbia
- Karadaglije, a village in northern Bosnia and Herzegovina
- Karadagh a village from Kurdistan iraq near As Sulaymaniah

== Other uses ==
- Karadag Khanate (1747–1808), a khanate around Ahar, Iran
- Karadagh rug, a style of carpet from the Karadagh area of Iran

== See also ==
- Qaradağlı (disambiguation)
- Qaradagh (disambiguation)
- Black Mountain (disambiguation)
- Tribes of Karadagh, the Turkic peoples of Arasbaran
