= Russians in Azerbaijan =

Ethnic group in Azerbaijan

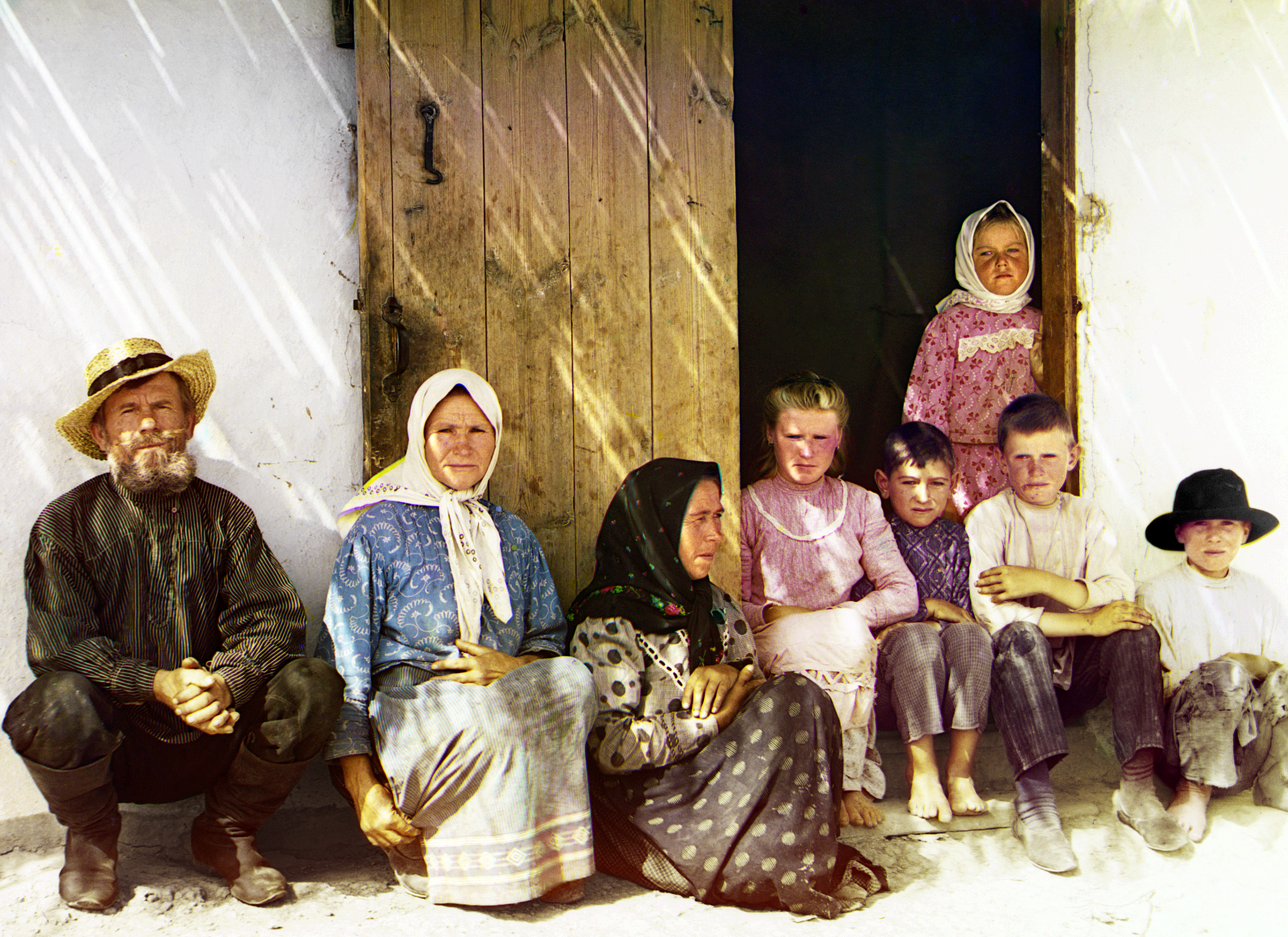
- A family of Russian settlers in the Mughan steppe of Azerbaijan (early 20th century)

Total population
- 71,046 (2019 census)

Regions with significant populations
- Baku, Ganja, Sumqayit, Ismayilli, Khachmaz

Languages
- Russian and Azerbaijani

Religion
- Eastern Orthodox Christianity, , Protestantism (Molokans), Islam

Related ethnic groups
- Russian diaspora

Russians are the second-largest ethnic minority in Azerbaijan, and the country is home to the largest Russian community in the South Caucasus and one of the largest outside of Russia. Although in decline, the community still numbers 71,046 people as of 2019. Since their arrival at the beginning of the 19th century, the Russians have played an important role in all spheres of life, particularly during the Czarist and Soviet period, especially in the capital city of Baku.

== History ==
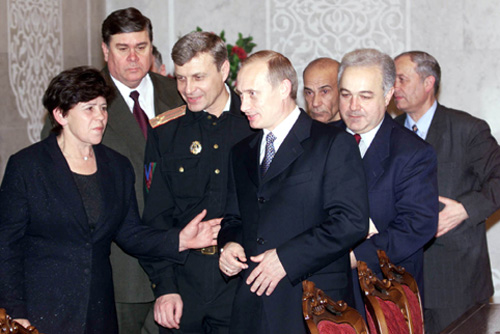
President Putin with Russian expatriates in Azerbaijan

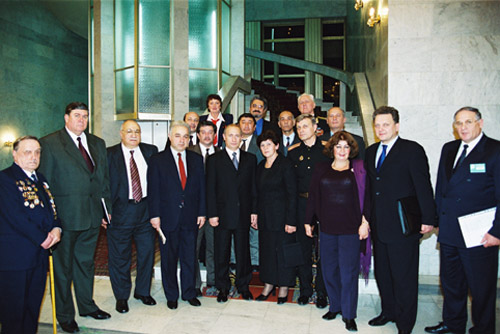
President Putin with Russian expatriates in Azerbaijan

Although a Cossack outpost near Lankaran already existed in 1795, the first Russian civilian settlers in Azerbaijan arrived only between 1830 and 1850, after the ratification of the Treaty of Turkmenchay. In 1832, the forced transmigration of Russian Old Believers and so-called 'sectarians' from the inner provinces of Russia to the South Caucasus began. In the mid-1830s ethnic Russians from the governorates of Tambov, Voronezh, and Samara began to arrive in the Shamakhy and Shusha uyezds, establishing the settlements of Vel, Privolnoye, Prishib, Nikolaevka, and İvanovka. For some time, the 'sectarians' were forbidden to settle in cities, until later when they founded neighbourhoods in Shamakhy and Lankaran. In 1859 they were allowed to settle in Baku. According to census records, by 1897, the Russian-speaking population of the Baku Governorate was 73,632; another large population of Russians was centered on Elisabethpol (modern Ganja), with a population of 14,146.

In the second half of the 19th century, the South Caucasus saw an unauthorised settlement of mainstream Russian Orthodox migrants, mostly landless peasants from European Russia. This process became widespread after the legalization of such migration by a special decree issued on 15 April 1899. In 1914 there was a large population of Russians in both Baku and Elisabethpol Governorates and adjacent uyezds of the Erivan Governorate, the largest groups being in the uyezds of Goychay, Shamakhi and Lankaran in the Baku Governorate and the Elisabethpol uyezd in the Elisabethpol Governorate.

Mass urban migration was also taking place. A favourable economic situation in Baku attracted many people from all over the Russian Empire. The Russian population of Baku grew from around 37,400 in 1897 to 57,000 in 1903 and reached 76,300 by 1913.

Interethnic conflicts in the South Caucasus that accompanied the Georgian, Armenian, and Azerbaijani declarations of independence in 1918 greatly impacted the Russian population. After the army of Azerbaijan suppressed the pro-Denikin and pro-Kolchak and later Bolshevik political movements in Mughan, much of the Russian population of the steppe chose to relocate to the North Caucasus, even though the Musavat-ruled government of Azerbaijan recognised their ownership of the lands which belonged to the prior to the October Revolution. Less than half of them returned in 1921, after the defeat of Musavat. Russian parties were represented in the parliament of the Azerbaijan Democratic Republic up to Sovietization of Azerbaijan in 1920.

Migration trends continued in the Soviet epoch, when qualified professionals from other parts of the Soviet Union moved to Azerbaijan (mainly to cities). Russians remained the largest ethnic group in Baku, according to the 1926 and 1939 censūs. In Ganja, the Russian population constituted 8.2% in 1926. Overall, 26.6% of the total urban population of Azerbaijan in 1926 and 35.7% in 1939 were Russians. The last massive wave of Russian migration in Azerbaijan was observed in 1949, having to do with the development of the industrial city of Sumqayit north of Baku.

The activation and subsequent rise to power of the National Democratic Azerbaijani Popular Front Party in the early 1990s was generally met by Azerbaijan's Russian population with disbelief, although from the advent of the Armenian-Azerbaijani conflict local community organizations unanimously supported the Azerbaijan's position with regard to Nagorno-Karabakh. The deterioration of the Azerbaijani-Russian relations and the ensuing anti-Russian propaganda of the Popular Front played contributed to the concern of the Russian population for its future in Azerbaijan. Although, according to the then Russian ambassador to Azerbaijan Walter Shonia, the new government did not pursue the policy of suppressing the Russian population, the press and some party leaders in their speeches supported the nationalist feelings by mentioning Russia as an ally of Armenia in the Armenian-Azerbaijani conflict and a power which sought to deprive Azerbaijan of its newfound independence.

The events of Black January, the economic downturn, and the war with Armenia, coupled with growing pessimism and psychological discomfort, and pressure from the Azeri refugees from Armenia led to the exodus of Russian-speaking population of Azerbaijan. Between 1989 and 1999, the numbers of the Russian population fell from 392,000 to 142,000, of which 63% were women and the median age was 41 (compared to 26–31 across the country).

On 1 July 2025, Azerbaijani authorities arrested eight Russian nationals who appeared in court in Baku with obvious signs of beatings, in apparent retaliation for the deaths of two Azerbaijanis in police custody in Yekaterinburg. Some of the Russian detainees were identified as IT professionals who emigrated to Azerbaijan after Russia announced partial mobilization in 2022.

== Concentration ==
According to the 1999 census, Russians comprised 7% of the population of Baku with approximately 120,000 of its 1.7 million people. This is significantly lower than in the middle of the 20th century when Russians comprised about a third of the population.

Smaller concentrations of Russians, including Cossacks, live in Sumqayit, Ganja, Khachmaz, Mingechaur, and Shirvan. Additionally, small Russian communities, some the descendants of exiled 'sectarians' and Old Believers, live in a number of villages throughout the country including Ivanovka in the Ismayilli Rayon; Slavyanka, Gorelsk and Novoivanovka in the Gadabay Rayon, Chukhuryurd, Gyzmeydan (formerly Astrakhanka) and Nagharakhana (formerly Kirovka) in the Shamakhi Rayon and Rus Borisi in the Goranboy Rayon. Approximately 500 Russians live in the Azerbaijani exclave of Nakhchivan.

Change in numbers of Azerbaijan's ethnic Russian population

1926	1939	1959	1970	1979	1989	1999	2009	2019
220,545	528,318	501,282	510,059	475,255	392,304	141,700	119,300	71,000

== Language ==
Russians in Azerbaijan speak Russian as a first language. However, the Russian vernacular of Baku reveals a series of distinct features in phonetics, vocabulary and prosody, characteristic of Russian-speakers of all ethnicities in Azerbaijan. They are considered to be the influence of Azeri. Furthermore, the originally Southern Russian dialect of the descendants of the 'sectarian' Russians still bears many traces of Old Russian which have been lost in literary Russian.

Despite the strengthening position of the Azeri language, Russian continues to be a vernacular language of Baku. Periodicals and other literature are printed in it. Russian-speaking writers are united by an organisation called Luch. Unlike in Central Asia, Russians in modern Azerbaijan are more likely to be bilingual in Russian and the national language, with many being fluent in Azeri.

== Religion ==
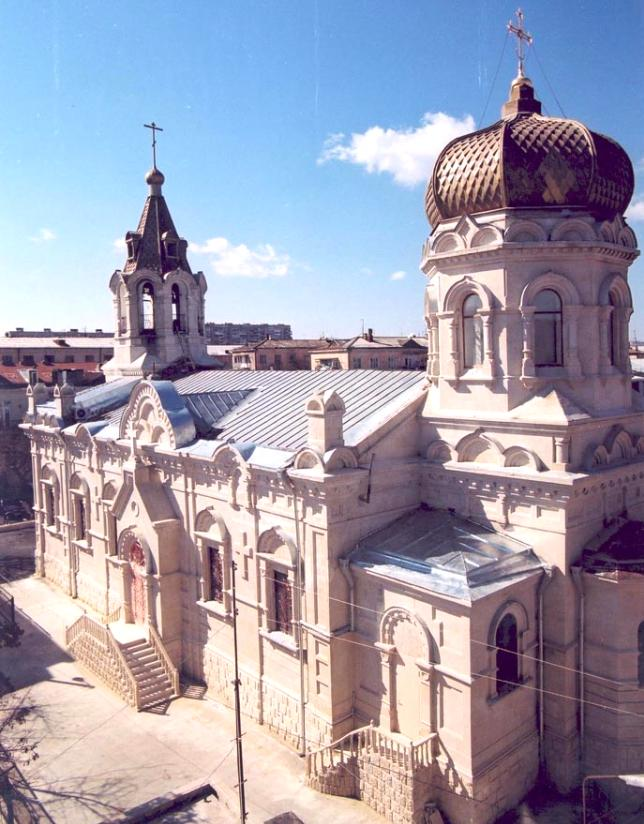
Baku, Russian-Orthodox Holy Myrrhbearers Cathedral.

The majority of Russians in Azerbaijan are adherents of Eastern Orthodox Christianity, although a small number identify as atheists. The first Russian Orthodox church in Baku was built in 1815. In 1905, the Baku Eparchy, currently known as the Eparchy of Baku and Azerbaijan, was established; it currently oversees five subordinate churches. Outside of Baku, where there are three churches, Russian Orthodox churches function in Ganja and Khachmaz. There are officially registered communities of Molokans in Baku, Sumqayit, and Shamakhi.

== Notable people ==
- Anatoliy Banishevskiy
- Anna Bashta
- Nikolai Baibakov
- Garry Kasparov
- Vyacheslav Lychkin
- Vladimir Makogonov
- Maksim Medvedev
- Matvey Skobelev

== See also ==
- İvanovka - one of the largest Russian villages in Azerbaijan.
- Ethnic Russians in post-Soviet states
- Azerbaijan-Russia relations
- Azerbaijanis in Russia
