= Karadaglu =

Karadaglu may refer to:

- Tsakhkashen, Ararat, Armenia
- Qaradağlı (disambiguation), several places in Azerbaijan
