= Ustacallı =

- Location within Azerbaijan
- Coordinates: 41°25′21″N 48°50′59″E
- Country: Azerbaijan
- Rayon: Khachmaz
- Municipality: Qaradağ Buduq
- Time zone: UTC+4 (AZT)
  - Summer (DST): UTC+5 (AZT)

Ustacallı (also, Usta Cəlili and Ustadzhally) is a village in the Khachmaz Rayon of Azerbaijan. The village forms part of the municipality of Qaradağ Buduq.
