= Qayadibi =

Coordinates: 40°41′N 45°32′E

- Village
- Interactive map of Qayadibi
- Country: Azerbaijan
- Rayon: Tovuz
- Municipality: Qaradaş
- Elevation: 1,475 m (4,839 ft)

Qayadibi is a village in the municipality of Qaradaş in the Tovuz Rayon of Azerbaijan.
