= Qaradağ Buduq =

Human settlement in Azerbaijan

Coordinates: 41°25′N 48°50′E

Qaradağ Buduq (also, Qaradağ-buduğ) is a village and municipality in the Khachmaz Rayon of Azerbaijan. It has a population of 1,735. The municipality consists of the villages of Qaradağ Buduq, Qaradağlı, Rəhimoba, and Ustacallı.
