= Novosaratovka =

- Municipality
- Location within Azerbaijan
- Coordinates: 40°37′18″N 45°38′50″E
- Country: Azerbaijan
- Rayon: Gadabay

Population
  - Total: 2,328
- Time zone: UTC+4 (AZT)
  - Summer (DST): UTC+5 (AZT)

Novosaratovka (also, Novaya Saratovka) is a village, municipality and minor transport hub in the Gadabay Rayon of Azerbaijan. It has a population of 2,328. Though it's probably older, the current settlement was originally founded in the 1830s by Russians of the Doukhobor sect, one of several Old Believer villages in the area including nearby Novoivanovka and Gorelsk (now Daşbulaq).

== History ==
According to grave inscriptions, the first recorded Russian settler was a certain Batayev, who arrived in 1837. During the 1840s and 1850s, Novosaratovka attracted a steady influx of immigrants from Russia, especially from the Balashovsky District of Saratov. Many of them, being serfs or being recruited, did not officially have the right to travel to the Transcaucasus and therefore lived essentially as fugitives, often changing their names to disguise their backgrounds.

== Monuments ==
In 2017, a bust of Colonel Jahangir Rustamov (1939-1994) was erected in front of the military headquarters in the village, commemorating the former-Soviet leader who led the counterattack that reclaimed Mutudərə from Armenian occupation in 1992.

== Notable natives ==
- Ivan Bogdanov — Hero of the Soviet Union.
