= Qaradagh =

Qaradagh may refer to:

- Arasbaran or Qaradagh, Iran
  - Karadaghis, subtribe of the Azerbaijanis from the region
  - Tribes of Karadagh, other tribes from the region
- Qaradagh, Iraq, a town in Qaradagh District

== See also ==
- Qaradagh District, district in Iraq
- Qaradag (disambiguation)
