= Qonaqlı =

Coordinates: 40°43′N 45°29′E

Qonaqlı is a village in the municipality of Qaradaş in the Tovuz Rayon of Azerbaijan.
