= Qaradağlı, Beylagan =

Qaradağlı
- Municipality
- Location within Azerbaijan
- Coordinates: 39°39′39″N 47°47′00″E
- Country: Azerbaijan
- Rayon: Beylagan

Population
  - Total: 690
- Time zone: UTC+4 (AZT)
  - Summer (DST): UTC+5 (AZT)

Qaradağlı (also, Karadagly and Karadsely) is a village and municipality in the Beylagan Rayon of Azerbaijan. It has a population of 690.
