= Europatriotism =

Form of patrioism

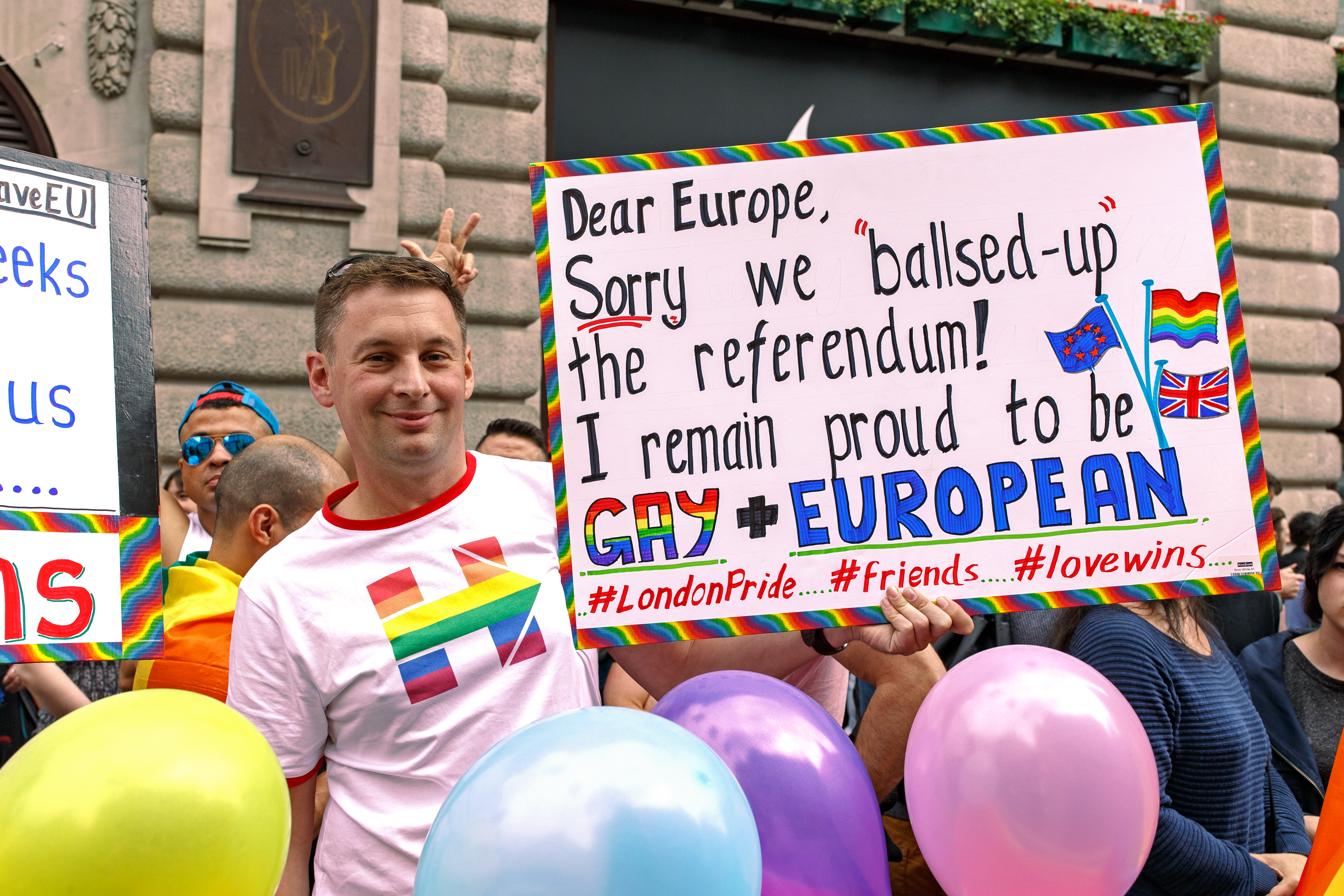
Pride in London 2016 – A man with an anti-Brexit sign on the parade route

European culture comprises a wide variety of national cultures, which influenced the creation of the various European nation-states. The process of European integration pursued by the European Union co-exists with national loyalties and national patriotism.

Pan-European identity generally competes with national identity. 1999 Eurobarometer surveys show that only 6% in the EU combine feeling European with their national identity. The European Union has made some attempts to increase identification with 'Europe' (meaning the EU itself), and has introduced some European symbols, but this was never as intensive as the promotion of national identity in the nation-states.

== Hopes of a European patriotism ==
Since the EU is not generally seen as a nation, a patriotism comparable to that of nation-states is not to be expected. Some people see that as an advantage, since it would allow for a 'constitutional patriotism' (Jürgen Habermas) directed toward the EU.

However, in the early post-World War II period, and in the 1950s, there were those who believed that 'Europe' could develop a patriotism of its own. At the time the memory of Nazi propaganda with its emphasis on loyalty to Volk was still strong, and a European patriotism was seen primarily as a counter to national aggression. Two post-war speeches by Winston Churchill illustrate the views of the time, although Churchill was using "European" in the British sense – meaning continental Europe:

"Why should there not be a European Group which could give a sense of enlarged patriotism?"
Winston Churchill in Zürich, 19 September 1946

"We hope to see a Europe where men of every country will think as much of being a European as of belonging to their native land, and that without losing any of their love and loyalty of their birthplace. We hope wherever they go in this wide domain, to which we set no limits in the European Continent, they will truly feel 'Here I am at home. I am a citizen of this country too."
Winston Churchill in Amsterdam, 9 May 1948

== 'Europe' seen from outside ==
The definition of 'Europe' in both a geographical and cultural sense has always been debated, especially among Europeans themselves.

=== American views ===
The way the United States looks at Europe is changing too, given the last update of the CIA World Factbook. Its 2005 edition says the following about the European Union: There have been some significant changes to the latest edition of the World Factbook. The European Union is now included as an "Other" entity at the end of the listing. The European Union continues to accrue more nation-like characteristics for itself and so a separate listing was deemed appropriate. A fuller explanation may be found under the European Union Preliminary statement.

=== Chinese views ===
Chinese views of the European future are developing. A paper published several years ago saw the European Union as a rising superpower, "poised to overtake both the United States and Japan as the biggest trade and investment force in China".

=== Negative reactions in the Middle East ===
An example of negative perception of 'Europe' as a unit came during the Jyllands-Posten Muhammad cartoons controversy. The al-Aqsa Martyrs' Brigades raided the European Union offices in Gaza, demanding apologies from Denmark and Norway. The protesting Palestinians evidently saw the cartoons as a 'European issue', more so than people in Europe itself, although the EU did ultimately issue a statement on the controversy.

== The idea of 'Europe' ==
A sense of European identity traditionally derives from the idea of a common European historical narrative. In turn, that is assumed to be the source of the most fundamental European values. Typically the 'common history' includes Ancient Greece and Ancient Rome, the feudalism of the Middle Ages, the Renaissance, the Age of Enlightenment, colonialism, 19th century Liberalism, and the World Wars . Although supporters of European integration often appeal to the 'common heritage', notably in discussions on the European Constitution, its exact nature is disputed. It does not create a uniform perspective on politics and current affairs: Europeans continue to disagree with each other, as they have done for thousands of years.

The European heritage and values, in this typical form, is very similar to the supposed common history and heritage of the Western World. Countries with a European-immigrant majority can equally claim it, and secular conservatives in the United States emphasise it strongly. Maurits van der Veen comments:

"Some have argued that there is a shared European history and culture that all European share and whose particular contents and facts – from Charlemagne to Erasmus, from Napoleon to Hitler, from Dante to Shakespeare, etc. – help provide a shared consciousness. Of course, one may question to what degree this culture marks us as European rather than Western: more Australians and Americans probably read Shakespeare than do Germans or Italians, for example."

The 'common heritage' also includes some controversial elements, above all Christianity. The European Convention rejected inclusion of a reference in the proposed European Constitution to Christianity and/or God. The text finally adopted in the Preamble reads:

DRAWING INSPIRATION from the cultural, religious and humanist inheritance of Europe, from which have developed the universal values of the inviolable and inalienable rights of the human person, freedom, democracy, equality and the rule of law,...

== Pan-European identity in popular culture ==
The common cultural heritage is commonly seen in terms of high culture. Examples of a contemporary pan-European culture are limited to some forms of popular culture:

- Football: as Europe's most popular sport, modern European footballers can be found plying their trade across the continent. Notable examples include France's Thierry Henry (Arsenal) and Patrick Vieira (Internazionale), England's David Beckham (Real Madrid), Germany's Michael Ballack (Chelsea) and Jens Lehmann (Arsenal), Italy's Gianluca Zambrotta (FC Barcelona) and the Netherlands' Arjen Robben (Chelsea)(Bayern Munich), Robin van Persie (Arsenal) and Ruud van Nistelrooy (Real Madrid). Top European clubs also regularly compete against each other in UEFA-run tournaments.
- Music: Eurodance and electronic dance music, including elements of house, trance, techno and europop, European themes with uptake amongst mainly younger people. European bands and artists who have enjoyed success across the continent over the last decade include Robbie Williams (British), Air and Daft Punk (French) and Aqua (Scandinavian).
- The Eurovision Song Contest is one of the oldest identifiably 'pan-European' elements in popular culture. The contest is not run by the EU, but by European Broadcasting Union, and in fact it pre-dates the European Economic Community. It is also open to some non-European countries which are members of the EBU. Although it attracts a huge audience (hundreds of millions) and extensive media coverage, it is widely regarded as kitsch, at least in western Europe. In eastern Europe it is taken more seriously, and participation is seen as a sign of 'belonging to Europe', and even as a preliminary step to accession to the EU.
- Electronic Arts Battlefield 2 introduced the 'Euro Force' booster pack. A fictive army modelled after a possible future version of Eufor fighting under the European Flag using European build weaponry such as the Eurofighter Typhoon

Deliberate attempts to use popular culture to promote identification with the EU have been controversial. In 1997, the European Commission distributed a comic strip titled The Raspberry Ice Cream War, aimed at children in schools. The EU office in London declined to distribute this in the UK, due to an expected unsympathetic reception for such views. Also see:

=== European teams in sport ===
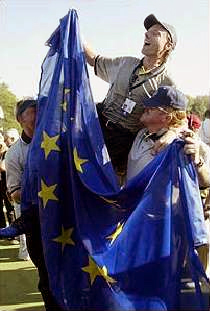
Europe wins 2004 Ryder Cup

Almost all sport in Europe is organised on either a national or sub-national basis. 'European teams' are rare, one example being the Ryder Cup, a Europe vs. United States golf tournament. There is a proposal to create a European Olympic Team. According to Eurobarometer surveys, only 5% of respondents think this would make them feel more of a 'European citizen'.

== European symbols ==
The European continent does not have any universally recognised pan-European symbols, yet the European Union and the Council of Europe provides Europe as such with the basic symbols that most nation-states bear. Such symbols are:

- A flag, the European flag – a symbol for most of Europe, being sponsored by the Council of Europe (and subsequently adopted by the EU),
- An anthem, Ode to Joy – as for the flag, this is a symbol for all Council of Europe members and also all EU member states,
- A "national day", Europe day (9 May) – as for the flag and the anthem,
- A single currency, the euro – the euro, if indeed it is a symbol of unity for all who use it as opposed to being adopted by practical or economic considerations, has been adopted by some countries outside of the EU, but not by all EU member states in the bloc, albeit those who have not adopted it are in the minority.

=== .EU domain name ===
The .eu domain name extension was introduced in 2005 as a new symbol of European Union identity on the World Wide Web. The .eu domain's introduction campaign specifically uses the tagline "Your European Identity" . Registrants must be located within the European Union.

== A European Army and Police? ==
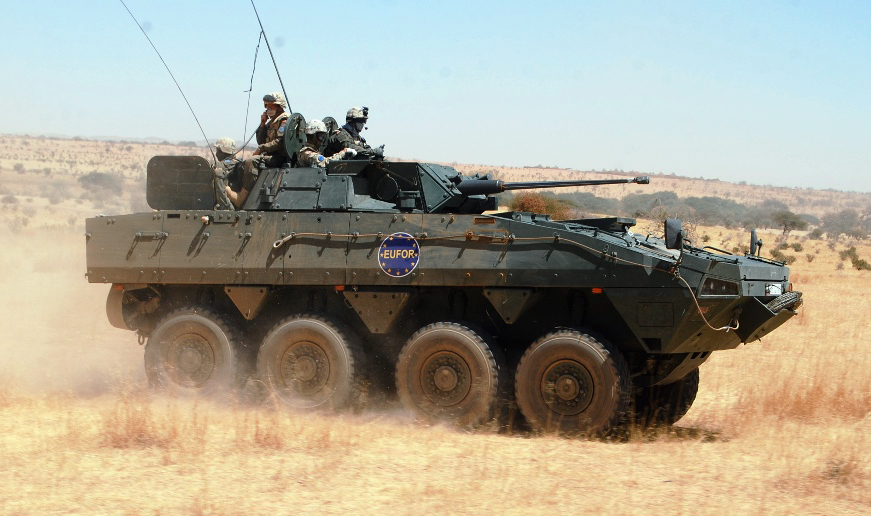
EUFOR Wheeled Armored Vehicle

In nation-states the national armed forces serve both as a unifying factor in themselves, and as a focus of patriotism. This factor is absent in the EU: most member states are members of a military alliance, the NATO, which is not 'European' but Atlantic in character. The European Union Force was founded in 2003. The goal is to have a permanent 60,000 person rapid reaction force by 2008. However, because of concerns about national sovereignty, there is no pan-European army, no EU policy to create one, and no prospect of one in the immediate or medium-term future.

For similar reasons, the European criminal intelligence agency Europol (established July 1999) is not a European Police and is not intended to become one. Although it is sometimes described as the 'European FBI', it has no investigatory powers of its own, and works through national police forces. (The FBI investigates federal crimes in the United States, and since there is no 'European criminal law' there is no comparable investigatory role).

== Pan-European Projects ==
In some cases identification with the EU might be promoted by pan-European projects. Nation-states did use infrastructural and scientific projects as a means of promoting national unity, notably the construction of national railway networks in the 19th century. There are some 'pan-European' projects, most limited to the EU, others involving other Council of Europe member states.

=== Trans-European Networks ===
The infrastructure projects of the Trans-European Networks (TEN) have the greatest similarity to the national infrastructure programmes of the 19th and 20th centuries. They are intended to improve European infrastructure.

=== European Space Agency ===
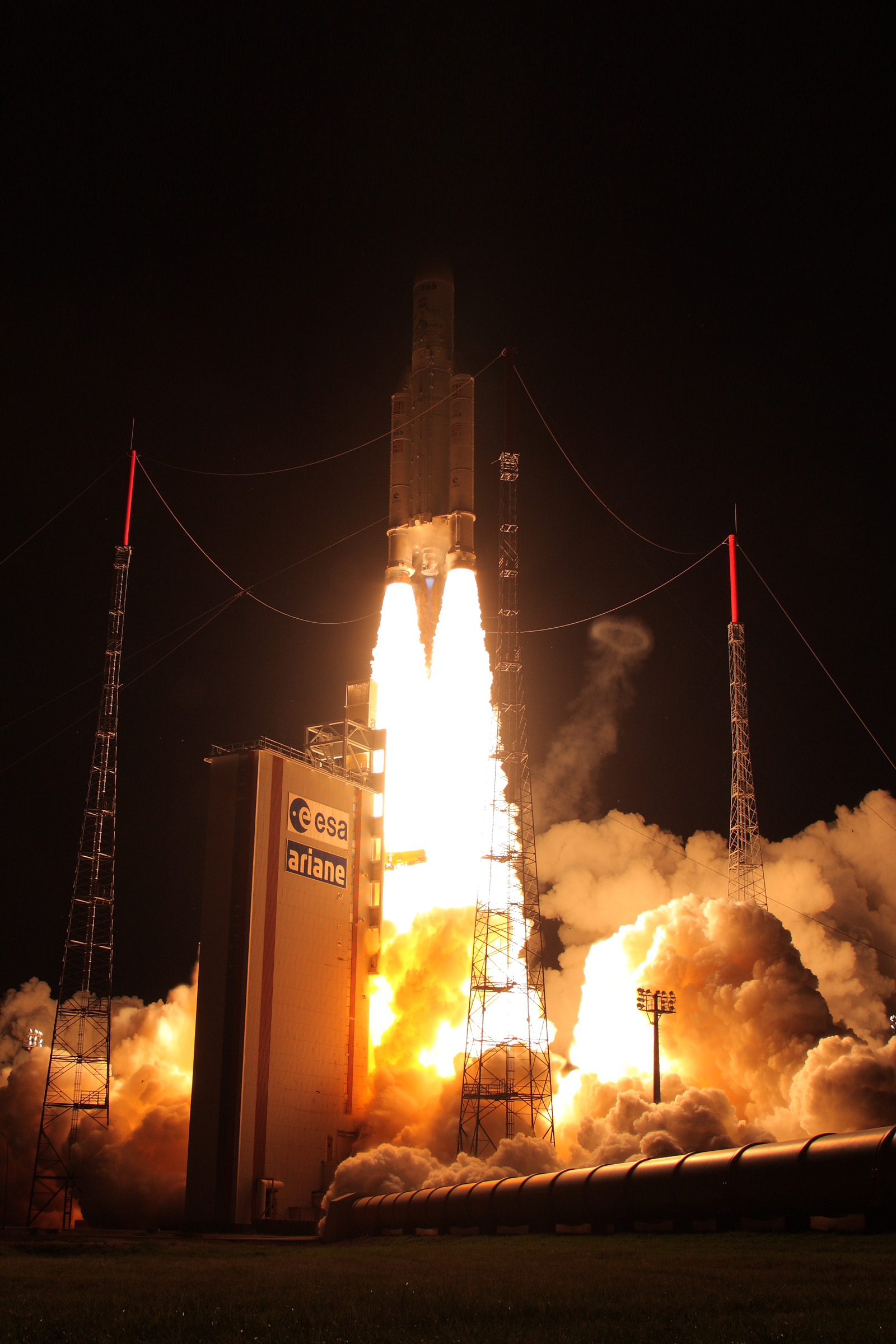
Europe's Ariane 5 heavy lift launch vehicle lifting a European unmanned cargo resupply spacecraft Albert Einstein ATV to the International Space Station.

The European Space Agency's headquarters are in Paris, France. The ESA is not an EU agency, and not all EU member states are ESA members. ESA's spaceport is on EU territory, even though it is located at the South-American continent. Guiana Space Centre in Kourou, French Guiana was chosen as launch site because it is close to the equator from which commercially important orbits are easier to access. During the era of Ariane 4 ESA gained the position of market leader in commercial space launches.

=== European GPS: Galileo ===
The ESA has launched the first set of satellites required for the Galileo GPS network. This is mainly a political decision by the EU to reduce dependence on American military technology and can thus be seen as a political statement. The Galileo system is operated under civilian control, as opposed to GPS which is operated under American military control. It provides more precise navigation and coverage at higher altitudes.

=== Airbus and Eurofighter ===
Many argue that the success of Airbus has proved that European joint-projects can compete successfully with the United States, although there are still outstanding issues with the WTO over allegations of hidden and/or illegal subsidised financing of aircraft projects both for Airbus and Boeing. Although often described as 'European' in the sense of not being American, Airbus is not itself an EU project.

Like Airbus, Eurofighter is European in the sense of not being American: it has four European nations as co-sponsors, and other European nations are likely to purchase aircraft. France, Sweden and Russia all manufacture competitor aircraft.

== Books ==
- 2004, The European Dream: How Europe's Vision of the Future Is Quietly Eclipsing the American Dream, Jeremy Rifkin, ISBN 1-58542-345-9
- 2004, The United States Of Europe: The New Superpower and the End of American Supremacy, T.R. Reid, ISBN 1-59420-033-5

== See also ==
- Pan-European identity
- United States of Europe
- Pro-European
- Europeanist
- Europhile
- European Union as an emerging superpower
- Brexit
- Volt Europa pro-European political movement aiming to foster democracy on the EU level and build European patriotism.
