= Qaradaş =

- Municipality
- Location within Azerbaijan
- Coordinates: 40°41′44″N 45°29′24″E
- Country: Azerbaijan
- District: Tovuz

Population
  - Total: 353
- Time zone: UTC+4 (AZT)
  - Summer (DST): UTC+5 (AZT)

Qaradaş (also, Garadash and Garadagh) is a village and municipality in the Tovuz District of Azerbaijan. It has a population of 353. The municipality consists of the villages of Qaradaş, Qayadibi, and Qonaqlı.
