= Daşbulaq, Gadabay =

Daşbulaq
- Location within Azerbaijan
- Coordinates: 40°37′56″N 45°47′48″E
- Country: Azerbaijan
- Rayon: Gadabay
- Municipality: Qaradağ

Population (2009)
  - Total: 480
- Time zone: UTC+4 (AZT)
  - Summer (DST): UTC+5 (AZT)

Daşbulaq (until 2004, Qorelsk) is a village in the Gadabay Rayon of Azerbaijan. It forms part of the municipality of Qaradağ.

== History ==
Along with nearby Novoivanovka and the bigger town of Saratovka, Daşbulaq village was originally founded some time after the 1830s by Russian 'Old Believers', under the name Gorelsk (Горельск).
