= Sándor Bihari =

Hungarian painter

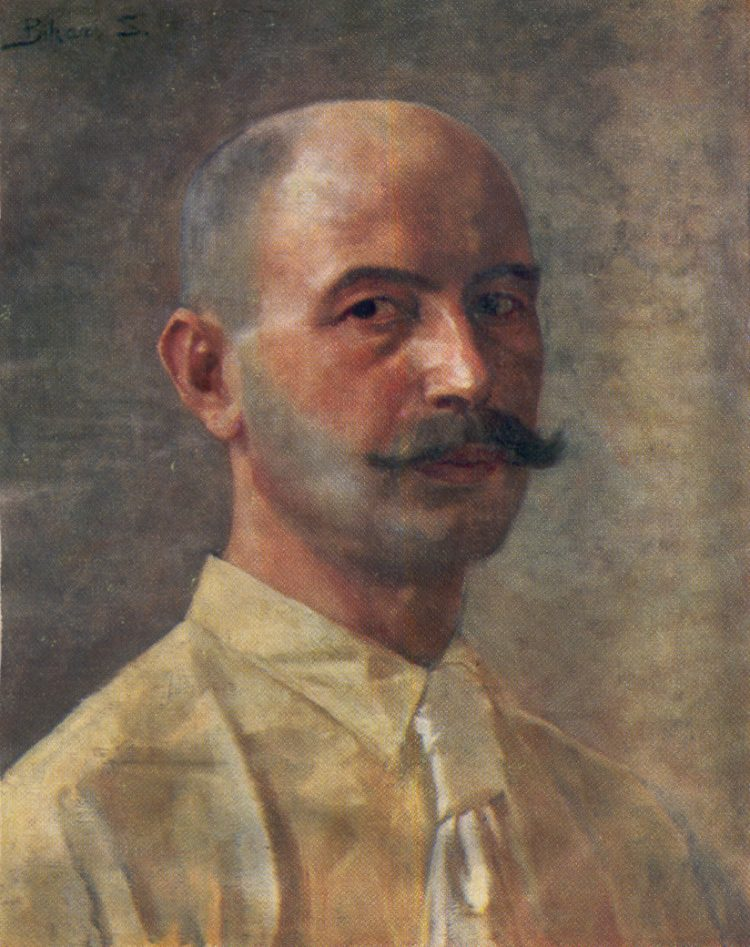
Self-portrait (c. 1890)

Sándor Bihari (19 May 1855, Rézbánya – 28 March 1906, Budapest) was a Hungarian genre painter.

== Life ==
Born to a Jewish family, Sándor spent his childhood in Nagyvárad. Originally, he worked with his father as a decorative painter. In 1874, he moved to Budapest, where he did retouching at a photography studio while attending a drawing school operated by Bertalan Székely. Two years later, he used his meager resources on a move to Vienna, where he hoped to enroll in the Academy of Fine Arts. At first he had to find work as a retoucher again and might have remained in that position, had he not received a gift of 600 Forints from Székely, which enabled him to quit his job and enter the academy.

He returned to his hometown, where he spent three years struggling as a portrait painter until a benefactor who liked his work provided the means for him to study in Paris. He travelled there in 1883, where he studied at the Académie Julian with Jean-Paul Laurens and improved his technique by copying the Old Masters at the Louvre. While there, he became acquainted with plein-air painting and Impressionism, which had a decisive influence on his style. Upon returning to Hungary, he settled in Szolnok, a popular gathering place for painters, and would later become one of the founders of an art colony there.

He continued to travel, making lengthy visits to Italy especially, until his health began to fail in 1893. During his final years, he lived in Budapest but continued to spend his summers in Szolnok. In 1896, he was awarded the Order of Franz Joseph.

== Selected paintings ==
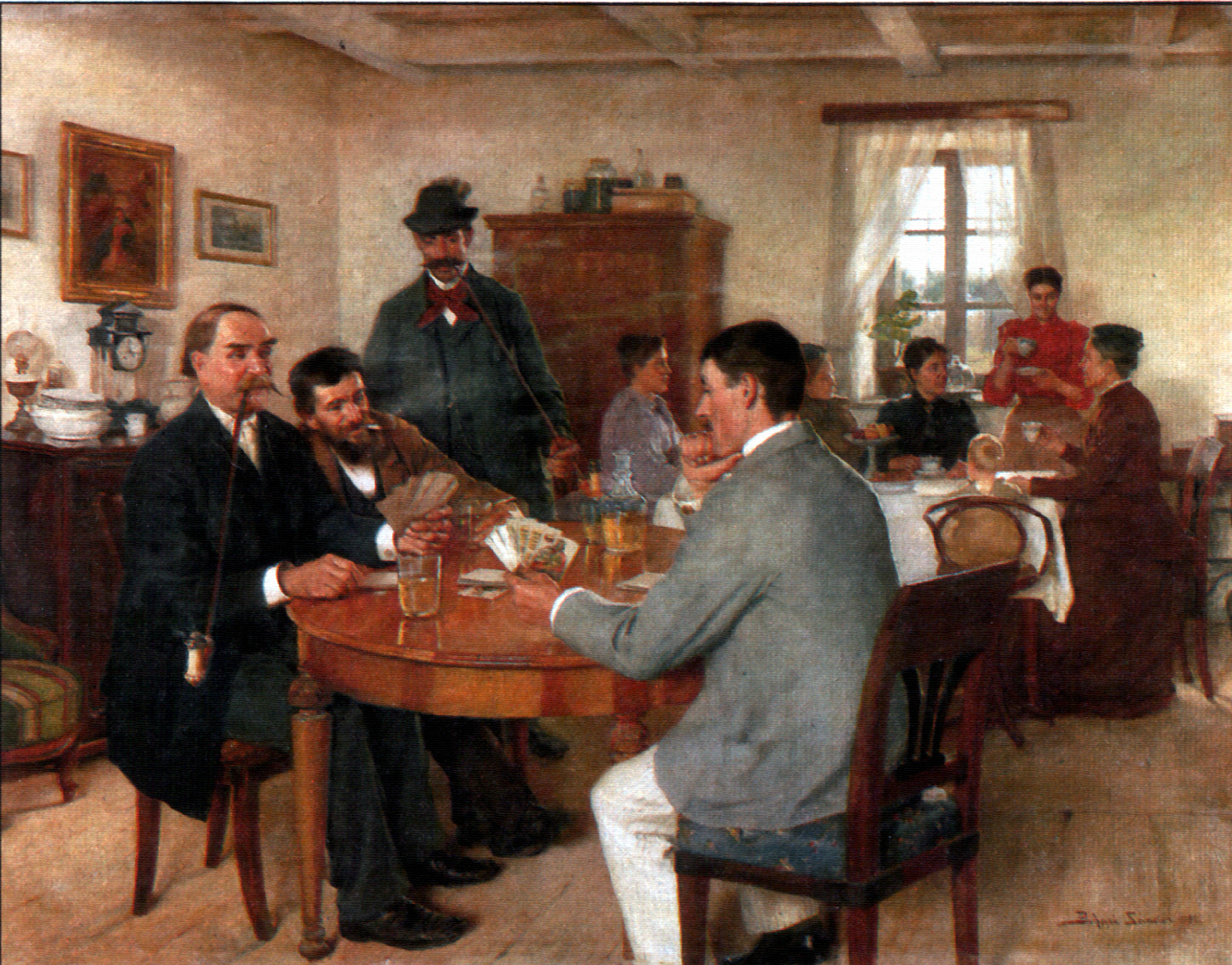
Sunday Afternoon (1893)

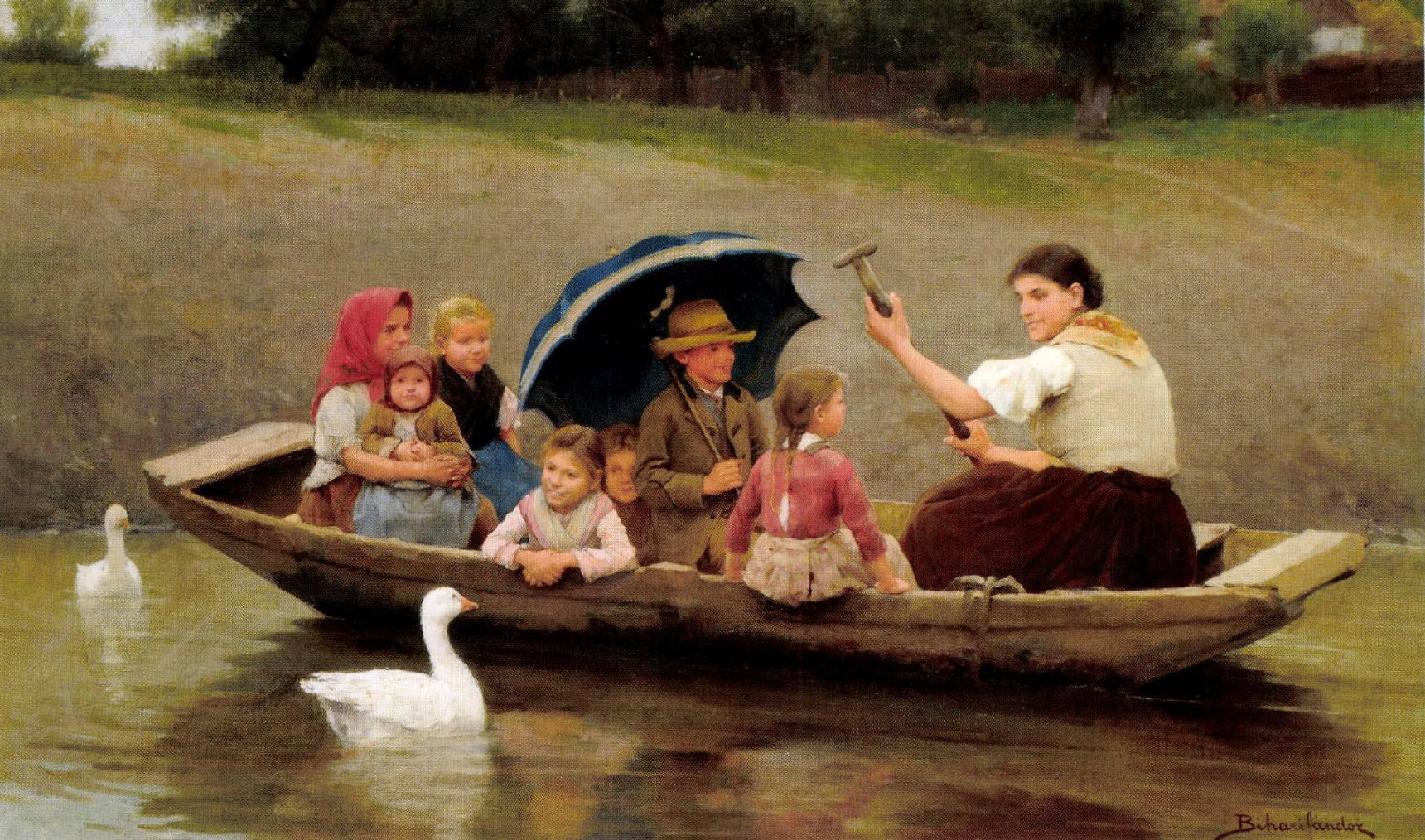
Boating on the Zagyva River (1886)

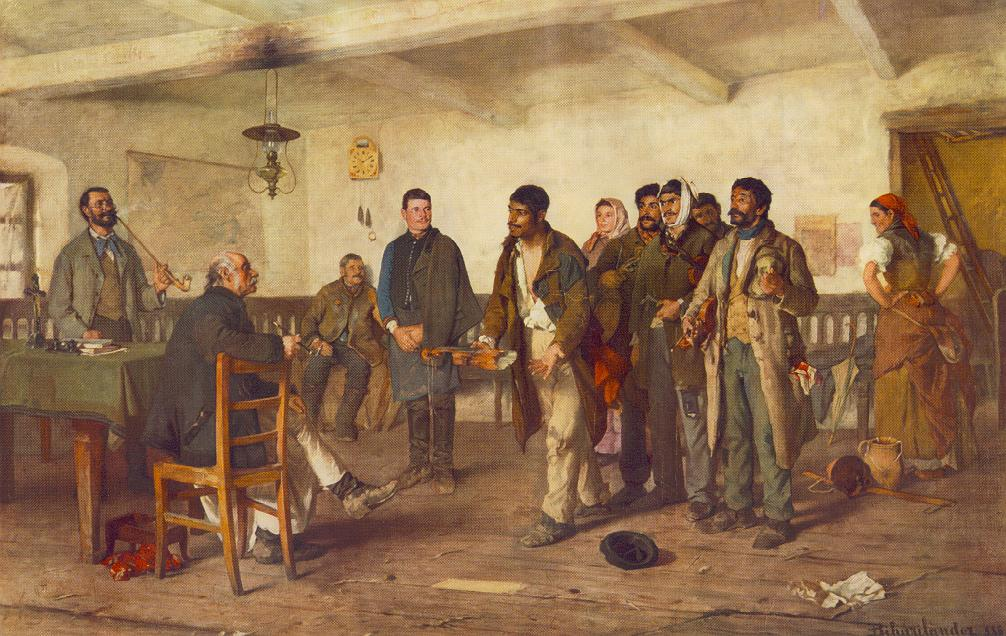
Before the Judge (1886),
his most familiar painting.

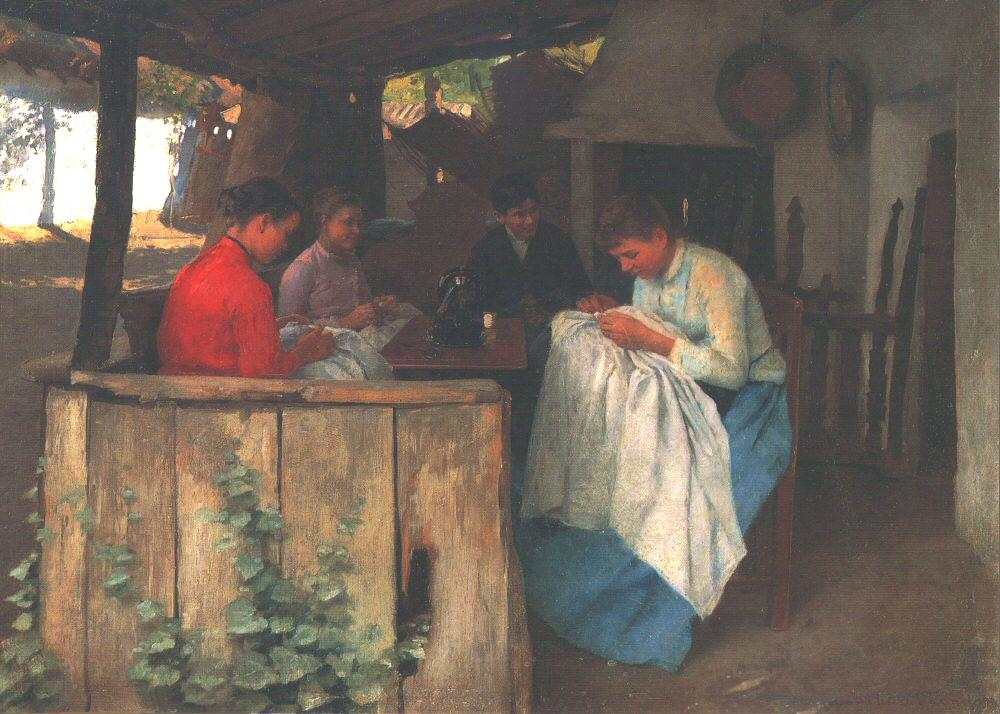
On the Porch (c. 1900)
