= Qaradağlı, Shaki =

Qaradağlı
- Municipality
- Location within Azerbaijan Location within Shaki-Zagatala Economic Region
- Coordinates: 41°10′21″N 47°00′47″E
- Country: Azerbaijan
- Rayon: Shaki

Population
  - Total: 266
- Time zone: UTC+4 (AZT)
  - Summer (DST): UTC+5 (AZT)

Qaradağlı (also, Karadagly) is a village and municipality in the Shaki Rayon of Azerbaijan. It has a population of 266.
