= Qaradağlı, Khachmaz =

Qaradağlı
- Location within Azerbaijan
- Coordinates: 41°24′N 48°50′E
- Country: Azerbaijan
- Rayon: Khachmaz
- Municipality: Qaradağ Buduq
- Time zone: UTC+4 (AZT)
  - Summer (DST): UTC+5 (AZT)

Qaradağlı (also, Karadagly) is a village in the Khachmaz Rayon of Azerbaijan. The village forms part of the municipality of Qaradağ Buduq.
