= Andalusian language =

Andalusian language may refer to:

- Andalusian Spanish, a Spanish dialect spoken in Andalusia
- Andalusian language movement, a fringe movement aiming for the recognition of Andalusian as a different language from Spanish
- Andalusi Arabic or Andalusian Arabic, a dialect of Arabic formerly spoken in Iberia
- Andalusi Romance, Andalusian Romance, or Mozarabic, a Romance language spoken in al-Andalus
