= Yuxarı Qaradağlı =

- Location within Azerbaijan Location within Karabakh Economic Region
- Coordinates: 40°16′16″N 46°58′26″E
- Country: Azerbaijan
- Rayon: Tartar
- Time zone: UTC+4 (AZT)
  - Summer (DST): UTC+5 (AZT)

Yuxarı Qaradağlı (also, Karadagly) is a village in the Tartar Rayon of Azerbaijan.
