= Qaradağ, Agsu =

Garadagh
- Municipality
- Azerbaijani: Qaradağ
- Location within Azerbaijan
- Coordinates: 40°24′11″N 48°24′05″E
- Country: Azerbaijan
- District: Agsu

Population
  - Total: 443
- Time zone: UTC+4 (AZT)
  - Summer (DST): UTC+5 (AZT)

Qaradağ (also, Garadagh) is a village and municipality in the Agsu District of Azerbaijan. It has a population of 443.
