= Qaradağlı, Barda =

Qaradağlı Gharadaghly
- Municipality
- Location within Azerbaijan Location within Karabakh Economic Region
- Coordinates: 40°24′06″N 47°07′08″E
- Country: Azerbaijan
- Rayon: Barda

Population
  - Total: 1,144
- Time zone: UTC+4 (AZT)
  - Summer (DST): UTC+5 (AZT)

Qaradağlı is a village and municipality in the Barda Rayon of Azerbaijan, situated just north of the capital of the rayon, Barda. It has a population of 1,144.
