= Qaradağ, Gadabay =

Garadagh
- Municipality
- Azerbaijani: Qaradağ
- Location within Azerbaijan
- Coordinates: 40°37′N 45°48′E
- Country: Azerbaijan
- District: Gadabay

Population
  - Total: 1,318
- Time zone: UTC+4 (AZT)
  - Summer (DST): UTC+5 (AZT)

Qaradağ (also, Garadagh) is a village and municipality in the Gadabay District of Azerbaijan. It has a population of 1,318. The municipality consists of the villages of Garadagh and Daşbulaq (formerly, Qorelsk).
