= Novoivanovka =

- Municipality
- Location within Azerbaijan
- Coordinates: 40°33′34″N 45°32′33″E
- Country: Azerbaijan
- Rayon: Gadabay

Population
  - Total: 1,668
- Time zone: UTC+4 (AZT)
  - Summer (DST): UTC+5 (AZT)

Novoivanovka (also, Novaya Ivanovka) is a village and municipality in the Gadabay Rayon of Azerbaijan. It has a population of 1,665. Like nearby Novosaratovka and smaller Gorelsk (now Daşbulaq), it was founded in the mid-19th century by Russian Old Believers. Today it celebrates its history of Caucasian-Russian culture with a small museum dedicated to its founding community.

== History ==
As Novosaratovka grew, so its originally penniless settlers prospered, and by the 1850s several families had moved a few kilometres further west to the mountains and in the neighboring forest tracts of Baglydzha and Ak Kilisa ('White Church'). From the subsequent merger of these two small settlements, Novoivanovka was formed. Over the decade, the as-yet un-recognised settlement saw a steady influx of un-registered Old Believer farmers attracted by an abundance of land and a relatively favourable climate, though in its early years it proved necessary to surround the village with a stout log wall to defend residents from occasional clashes with Azerbaijanis living in the mountains. Settlers continued to arrive, including a group of nine farming families who arrived en masse from the village of Topchi in what was then Shamakha province. In 1858, the authorities became aware of Novoivanovka and a commission was set up to investigate the issuing of fake documents to the 'illegal' residents who had settled here, but legal resources were focussed on the document forgers rather than the farmers themselves. Most were eventually allowed to stay in 1861 once the village became officially legalized, the majority of residents being recognised as peasants and pardoned for having been runaway serfs (essentially slaves fleeing Russia).

Most of the ethnically Russian population left in the late 1980s and early 1990s but around 20 Old Believers still live in the village.

== Notable natives ==
- Nicholas Novoyatlov — Full Cavalier of the Order of Glory.
