= Qaradağlı (Qasımlı), Agdam =

Garadaghly
- Azerbaijani: Qaradağlı
- Location within Azerbaijan
- Coordinates: 39°59′N 46°58′E
- Country: Azerbaijan
- District: Aghdam
- Time zone: UTC+4 (AZT)
  - Summer (DST): UTC+5 (AZT)

Qaradağlı (also, Garadaghly) (Azerbaijani: Qaradağlı) is a village in the Aghdam District of Azerbaijan.
