= Latvian passport =

Passport of the Republic of Latvia issued to Latvian citizens

Latvian passport; Latvijas pilsoņa pase
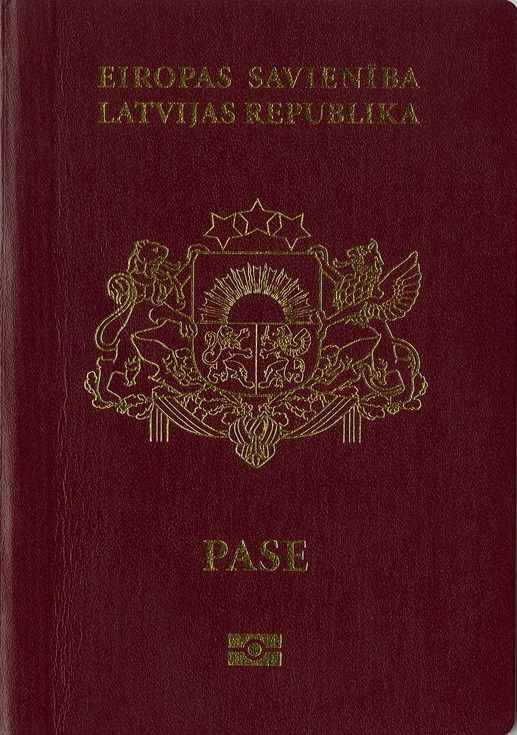
- Front cover of a contemporary Latvian biometric passport

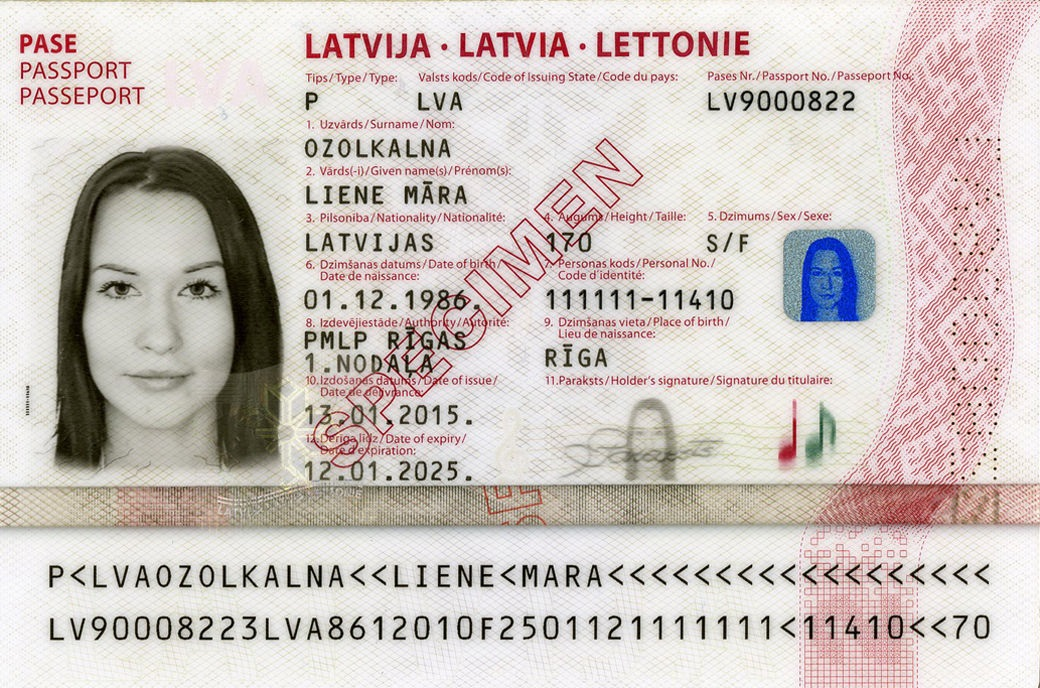
- Information page of a current design Latvian biometric passport
- Type: Passport
- Issued by: Latvia
- First issued: 20 November 2007 (biometric passports); 12 February 2024 (current version)
- Purpose: Identification
- Eligibility: Latvian citizenship
- Expiration: 10 years for citizens above 20; 5 years for citizens aged 5–19; 2 years or the time of travel for children (ages 0–5).
- Cost: Adults: €50 in 10 working days; €75 in 2 days. Pensioners, persons with disabilities and young people: €25 in 10 working days; €45 in 2 days.

Latvian passports (Latvian: Latvijas pilsoņa pase) are issued to citizens of Latvia for identity and international travel purposes. Receiving a valid passport is mandatory from the age of 15, but passports can be requested for younger children if needed for travel and other purposes. A passport is valid for 10 years if the citizen is 20 or older, for 5 years if 5–19 and for 2 years if 0–5 years old. Non-citizen passports, and refugee travel documents (in a passport-like format), are also issued. Every Latvian citizen is also a citizen of the European Union. The passport, along with the national identity card, allows Latvian citizens to travel and to have rights of free movement and rights to reside in any states of the European Union, European Economic Area and Switzerland.

== Physical appearance ==
Latvian passports are burgundy red, with the Coat of arms of Latvia emblazoned in the center of the front cover. The words EIROPAS SAVIENĪBA (Latvian for "European Union") and LATVIJAS REPUBLIKA (Latvian for "Republic of Latvia") are inscribed above the coat of arms, and the word PASE (Latvian for "Passport") below. The Latvian passport has the standard biometric symbol emblazoned below the coat of arms and uses the standard European Union design.

=== Identity information page ===
The Latvian passport includes the following data:

- Photo of passport holder
- Type (P)
- Code of issuing state (LVA)
- Passport no.
- 1. Surname
- 2. Given names
- 3. Nationality
- 4. Height
- 5. Sex
- 6. Date of birth
- 7. Personal no.
- 8. Authority (place of issue)
- 9. Place of birth
- 10. Date of issue
- 11. Holder's signature
- 12. Date of expiry

The information page ends with the transparent line and the Machine Readable Zone.

Optionally, the passport may also include information about the passport holder's ethnicity, underage children and their name in different orography (historical form or original form in a different language).

=== Languages ===
The data page/information page is printed in Latvian, English and French.

== Visa requirements ==
Countries and territories with visa-free entries or visas on arrival for holders of regular Latvian passports Latvia Freedom of movement Visa free Visa issued upon arrival eVisa Visa available both on arrival or online Visa required prior to arrival

As of December 2024, Latvian citizens had visa-free or visa on arrival access to 184 countries and territories, ranking the Latvian passport 8th in terms of travel freedom.

== Current passport ==
Fifth version (current): since 12 February 2024. 42 pages instead of old 34 pages. EU burgundy cover, enhanced passport and biometric security.

Fourth version: from 28 January 2015 until 11 February 2024. EU burgundy cover, biometric.

Third version: from 20 November 2007 until 27 January 2015. Burgundy cover. First Latvian bimetric passport (also called ePassport) to comply with the EU passport standards in all respects: format, security features. Passport also compliant with the US Visa Waiver Program.

Second version: from 1 July 2002 until 19 November 2007. Blue cover with scanned autograph and photo.

First version: from 1992 until 30 June 2002. Blue cover with glued photo.

Passports issued in the interwar period and during the occupation of Latvia by Latvian diplomatic service in exile featured a brown cover and glued photos for the holder and his spouse.

Diplomatic passport cover

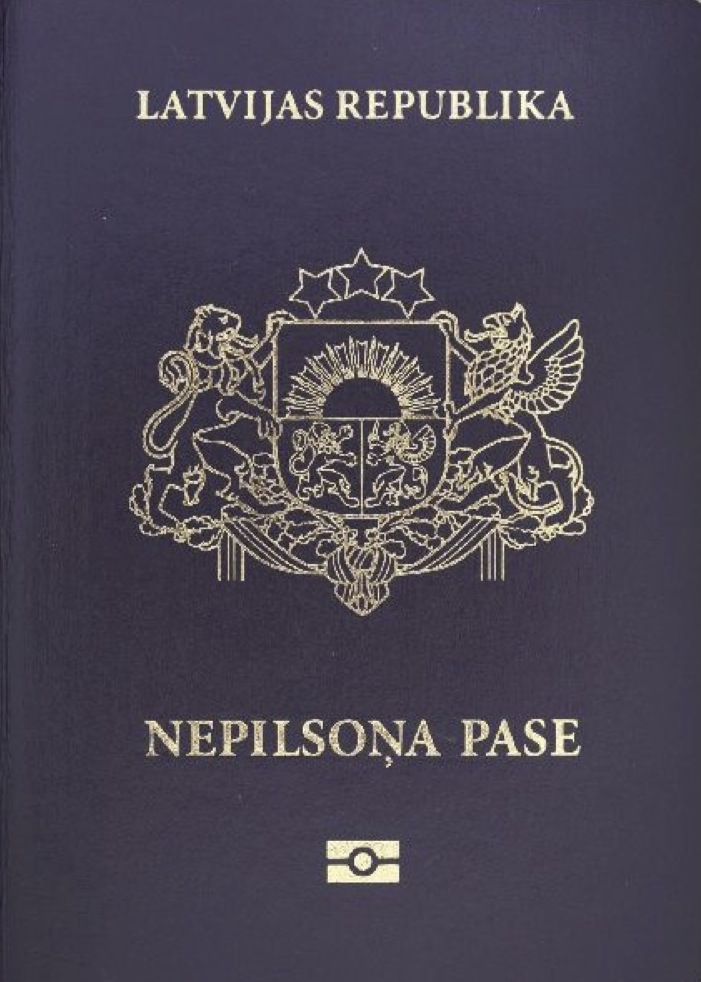
Non-citizen passport cover

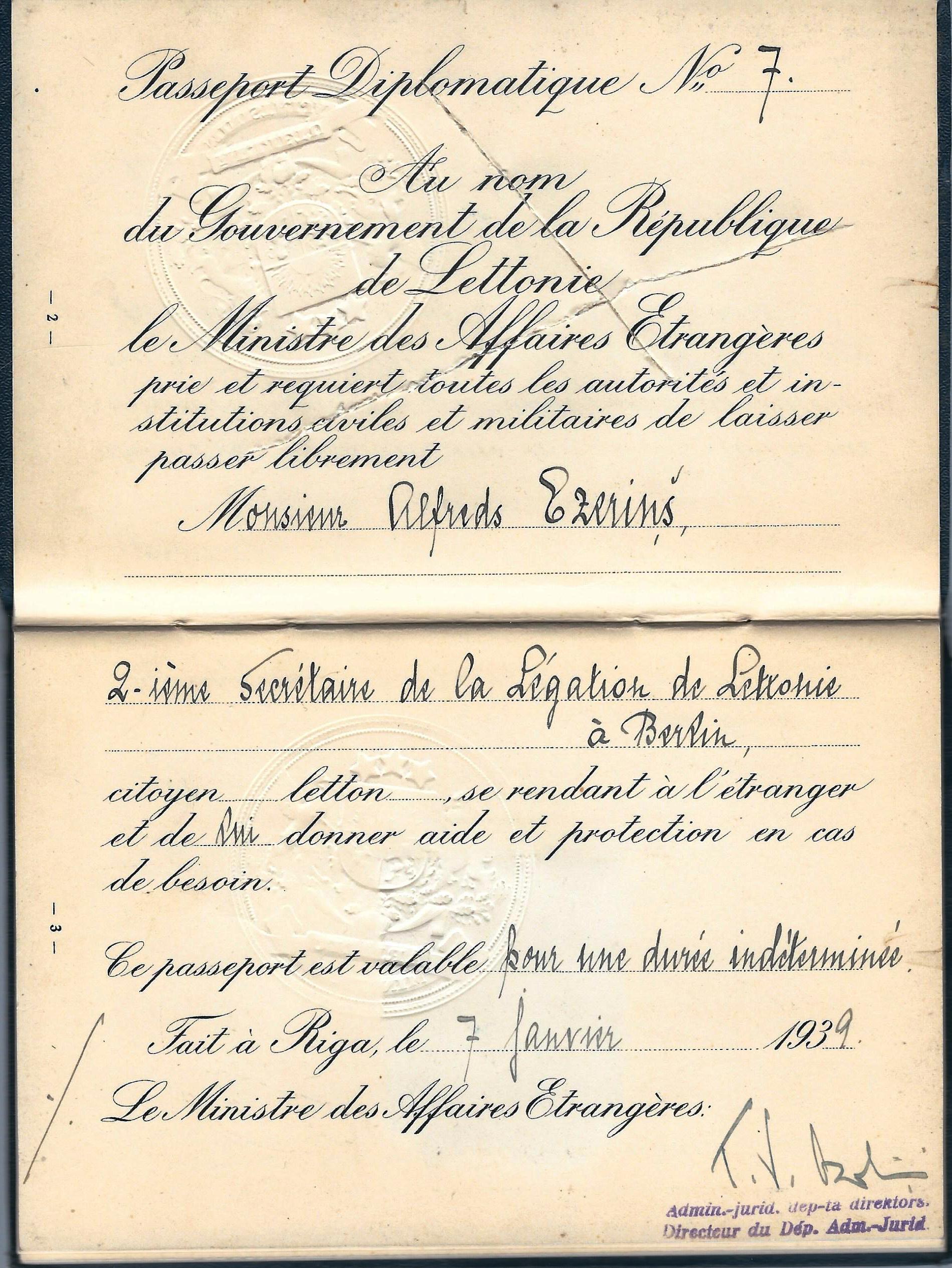
1939 Latvian diplomatic passport used for serving in Berlin

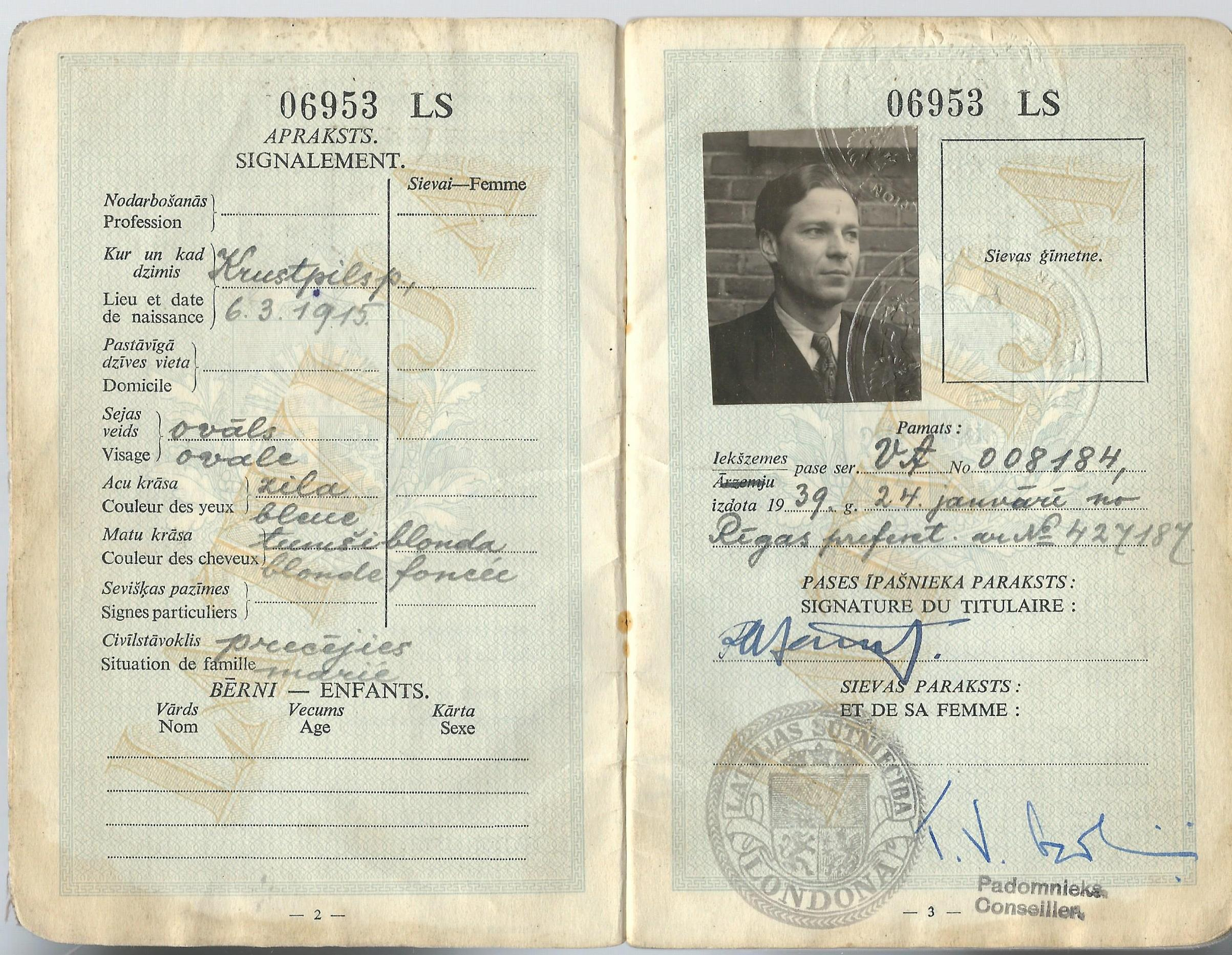
Latvian interwar period passport inside, prolonged in 1947 by the Latvian diplomatic service in exile

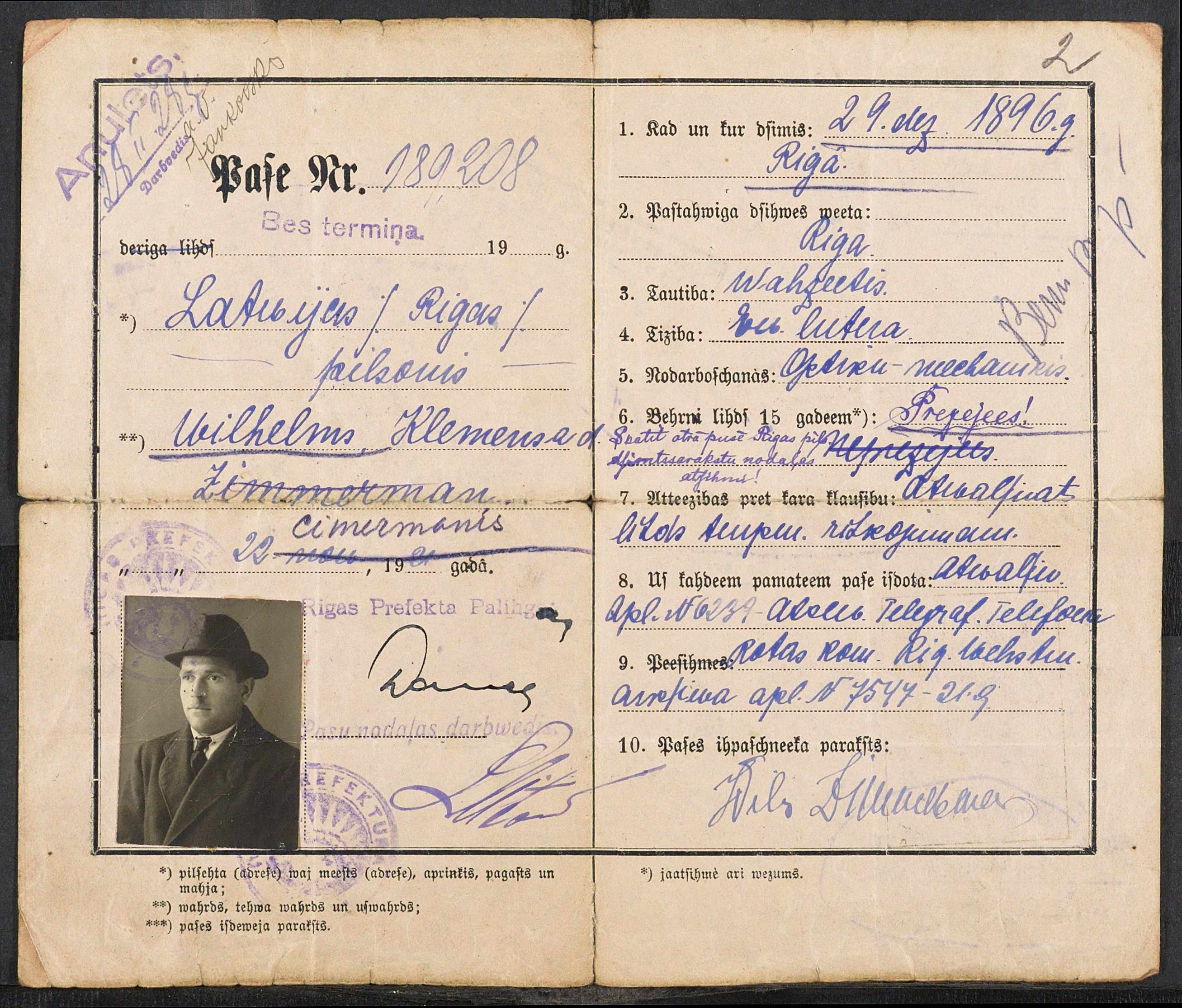
First Latvian passport design, issued in 1921

== See also ==
- List of passports
- Passports of the European Union
- Visa requirements for Latvian citizens
- Visa requirements for Latvian non-citizens
- U.S. Passport indicating non-citizen nationals, who usually are American Samoans
