= Immigration to Latvia =

Immigration to Latvia is the process by which people migrate to Latvia to reside in the country. Some, but not all, stay permanently and eventually become Latvian citizens. Immigration has been the main source of major population growth in Latvia in recent years due to negative natural increase.

As of 31 December 2024 according to the data of the Office of Citizenship and Migration Affairs (Latvian: Pilsonības un migrācijas lietu pārvalde (PMLP)), there were 85,978 foreigners with temporary residence permits and 45,731 with permanent residence permits, excluding Latvian citizens and Latvian non-citizens.

== History ==
In 1940, following the Molotov–Ribbentrop Pact, Latvia was incorporated into the Soviet Union. This period saw significant upheavals, including mass deportations of Latvians to Siberia and other remote regions. Between 1940 and 1941, approximately 16,563 individuals were deported. After World War II, from 1945 to 1949, an additional 43,904 people were forcibly expelled. These actions were part of the Soviet regime's efforts to suppress potential opposition and reshape the demographic landscape.

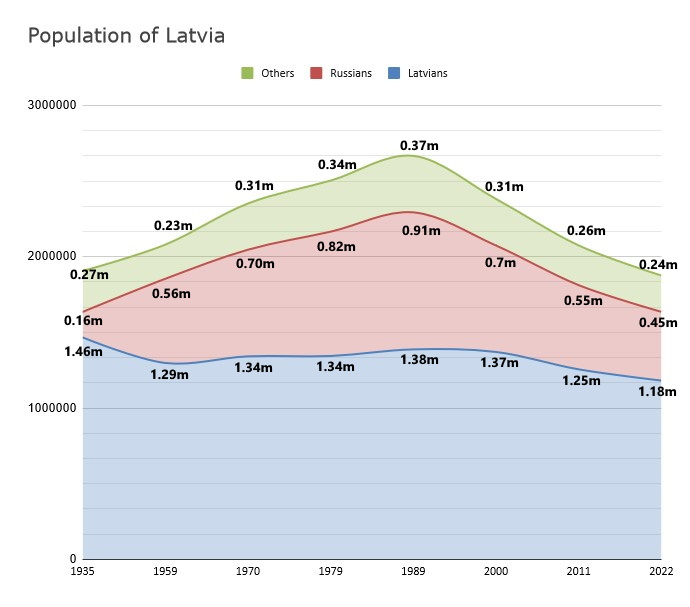
Population of Latvia (in millions) from 1935 to 2022

=== Soviet post-war industrialization and influx of immigrants ===
The most substantial immigration to Latvia occurred during the post-World War II era, particularly from the mid-1940s through the 1980s. The Soviet government initiated extensive industrialization projects in Latvia, establishing factories and industrial complexes that required a large workforce. To meet this demand, workers from various Soviet republics, especially Russia, were relocated to Latvia. This influx significantly altered the country's demographic composition. From 1959 to 1968, nearly 130,000 Russian speakers immigrated to Latvia, primarily to work in large industrial factories. These immigrants often received priority in housing, leading to the rapid construction of new residential areas. By 1959, about 400,000 Russian settlers had arrived, reducing the ethnic Latvian population to 62%.

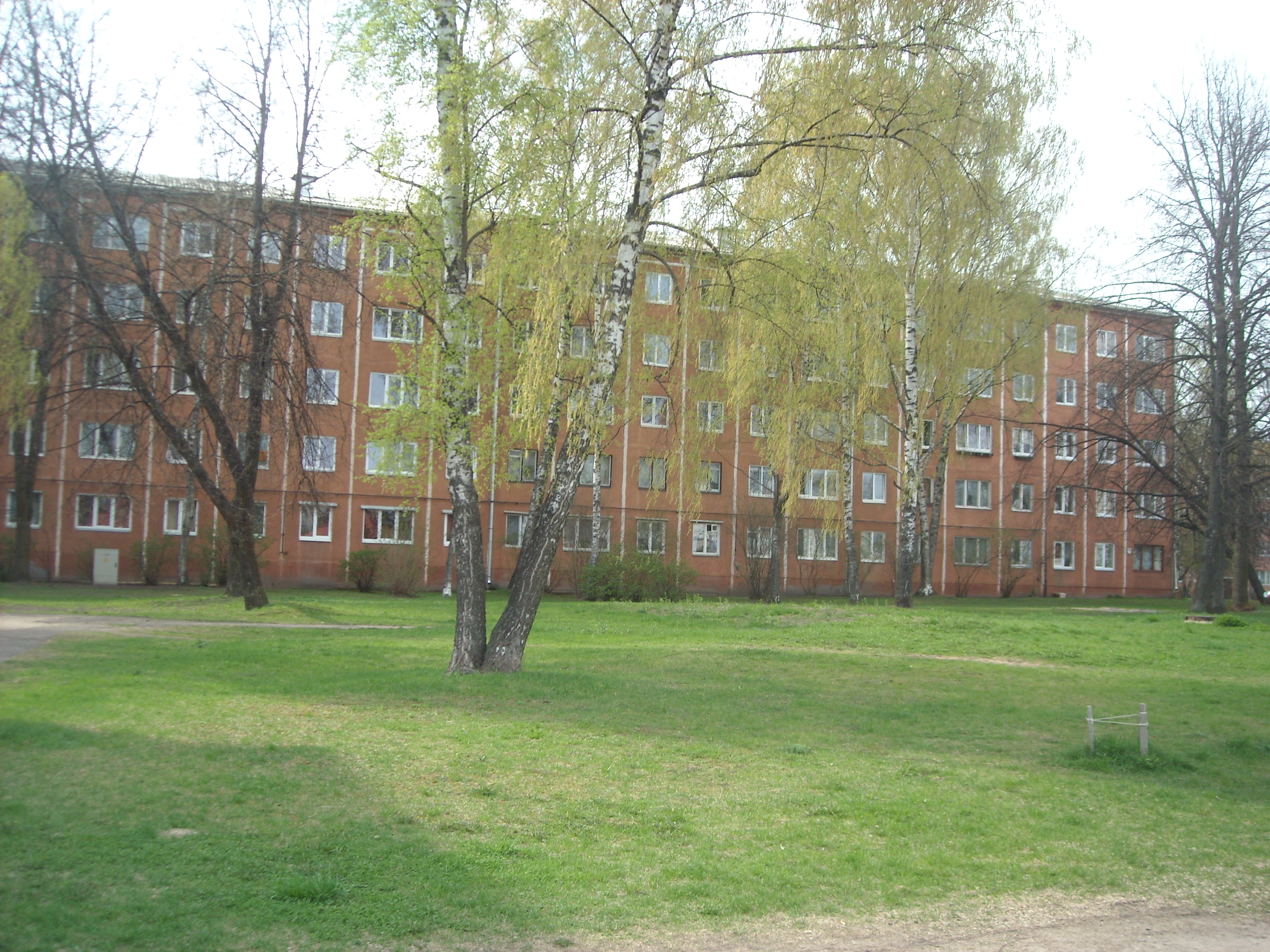
Khruschevka apartment block in Riga, built in the Soviet era

This trend continued, and by 1989, ethnic Latvians comprised approximately 52% of the population, down from 77% before the war.

==== Demographic impact ====
The continuous influx of immigrants from other Soviet republics led to a significant demographic shift. While the overall population of Latvia increased, the proportion of ethnic Latvians decreased markedly. This shift was a result of both the arrival of new residents and the earlier deportations and emigration of Latvians during and after the war. The Soviet-era settlement policies were driven by economic objectives, aiming to provide labor for industrial enterprises, and political motives, seeking to integrate Latvia more closely into the Soviet system by altering its ethnic composition.

=== After independence restoration ===
Since the collapse of the USSR in 1991, Latvia's population has significantly decreased, dropping from 2,658,161 to around 1,862,700 by 2025, a decline of approximately 30%. This trend is attributed to both natural decrease, with births consistently lower than deaths, and substantial emigration, particularly after joining the EU in 2004, which saw many young people seeking better opportunities abroad.

Migration data indicates Latvia experienced net emigration for most years post-1991, with negative net migration rates reflecting more people leaving than arriving. However, in 2022, a positive net migration of 18,800 was recorded, largely due to the arrival of 23,500 Ukrainian refugees following regional conflicts. This shift highlights the impact of geopolitical events on migration patterns.

==== Foreign students ====
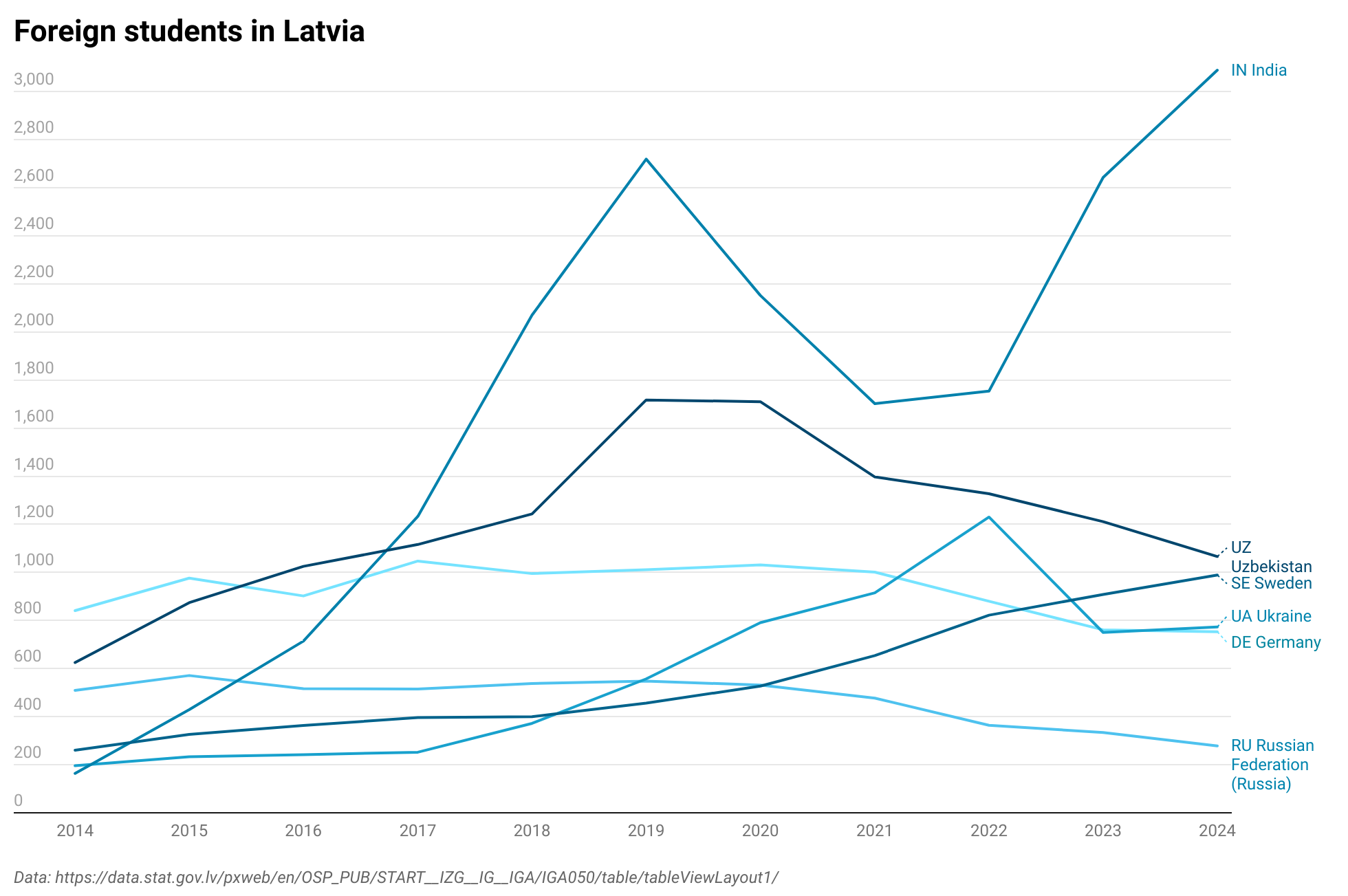
Foreign students in Latvia (since 2014)

Since around 2014, Latvia has seen a notable increase in foreign students, with numbers growing from about 1,500 before 2013 to over 8,000 by 2020, and continuing to rise. Popular programs include medicine, business, and IT, contributing economically with an estimated €148 million annually to the national budget. This trend is unexpected given the overall population decline, offering a counterbalance to demographic challenges.

The composition of foreign students in Latvia shows a diverse range of origins, with a significant portion from non-EU countries, particularly India and Uzbekistan.

The majority of mobile students in Latvia attend either Rīga Stradiņš University or Riga Technical University, with a combined 52.1% of students, others include Turība University.

== Statistics ==
According to the data of the Office of Citizenship and Migration Affairs (PMLP), as of 31 December 2024, there were 45,731 foreign nationals with permanent residence permits, excluding Latvian citizens and Latvian non-citizens.

=== Permanent residency ===
In the table only nationalities with a population of 100 or more are shown.

Permanent residency permit in Latvia
Country of affiliation	Population
Total	45731
Russia	30771
Ukraine	3104
Lithuania	2968
Belarus	2011
Estonia	671
Latvian non-citizen	454
Germany	441
Israel	338
China	290
United Kingdom	272
Afghanistan	263
Armenia	258
Kazakhstan	244
Uzbekistan	243
United States	240
Azerbaijan	220
Poland	212
Moldova	155
Vietnam	155
Italy	152
Sweden	126
Turkey	124
India	123
Denmark	122
Latvian stateless person	112
Georgia	106
Netherlands	100

=== Temporary residency ===
In the table only nationalities with a population of 100 or more are shown.

Temporary residency permit in Latvia
Country of affiliation	Population
Total	85978
Ukraine	36203
Russia	10741
India	5245
Uzbekistan	4077
Germany	2754
Lithuania	2609
Belarus	2455
United Kingdom	1309
Italy	1066
France	1036
Sweden	913
Sri Lanka	882
Bulgaria	873
Turkey	822
Poland	821
Estonia	820
Israel	772
Azerbaijan	735
Finland	698
Romania	683
Tajikistan	663
United States	617
Kazakhstan	582
Spain	568
Georgia	512
Vietnam	494
China	447
Norway	366
Kyrgyzstan	353
Netherlands	344
Pakistan	339
Denmark	300
Philippines	300
Moldova	250
Armenia	248
Portugal	231
Greece	209
Czech Republic	198
Belgium	194
Ireland	180
Austria	171
Egypt	151
Switzerland	125
Cyprus	124
Cameroon	123
Hungary	117
Slovakia	116
Canada	112
Brazil	110

== See also ==
- Opposition to immigration
- Remigration
- Timeline of the European migrant crisis
- Immigration to Europe
- List of countries by immigrant population
