= Poles in Latvia =

Total population
- 51,548 (2011 census)

Languages
- Russian (57.7% in 2000), Polish, Latvian

Religion
- Roman Catholicism

Related ethnic groups
- Poles, Latvians, Lithuanians, Latgalians

The Polish minority in Latvia (Polish: Polacy na Łotwie; Latvian: Latvijas poļi) numbers about 51,548 and (according to the Latvian data from 2011) forms 2.3% of the population of Latvia. Poles are concentrated in the former Inflanty Voivodeship region, with about 18,000 in Daugavpils (Dyneburg) and 17,000 in Riga. People of Polish ethnicity have lived on the territory of modern Latvia since the 16th century. In modern Latvia their citizenship status vary: non-citizens of Latvia, as citizens of Poland, or as citizens of Latvia.

== Demography ==
Population with Polish ethnic affiliations
Census year	1897	1920	1930	1935	1959	1970	1979	1989	1996 est.	2000	2005 est.	2008 est.	2011 est.
Population	65,056	52,244	59,400	48,637	59,800	63,000	62,700	60,416	63,400	59,505	56,511	54,024	51,548
Percentage	3.4%	3.3%	3.1%	2.6%	2.9%	2.7%	2.5%	2.3%	2.6%	2.5%	2.5%	2.4%	2.3%

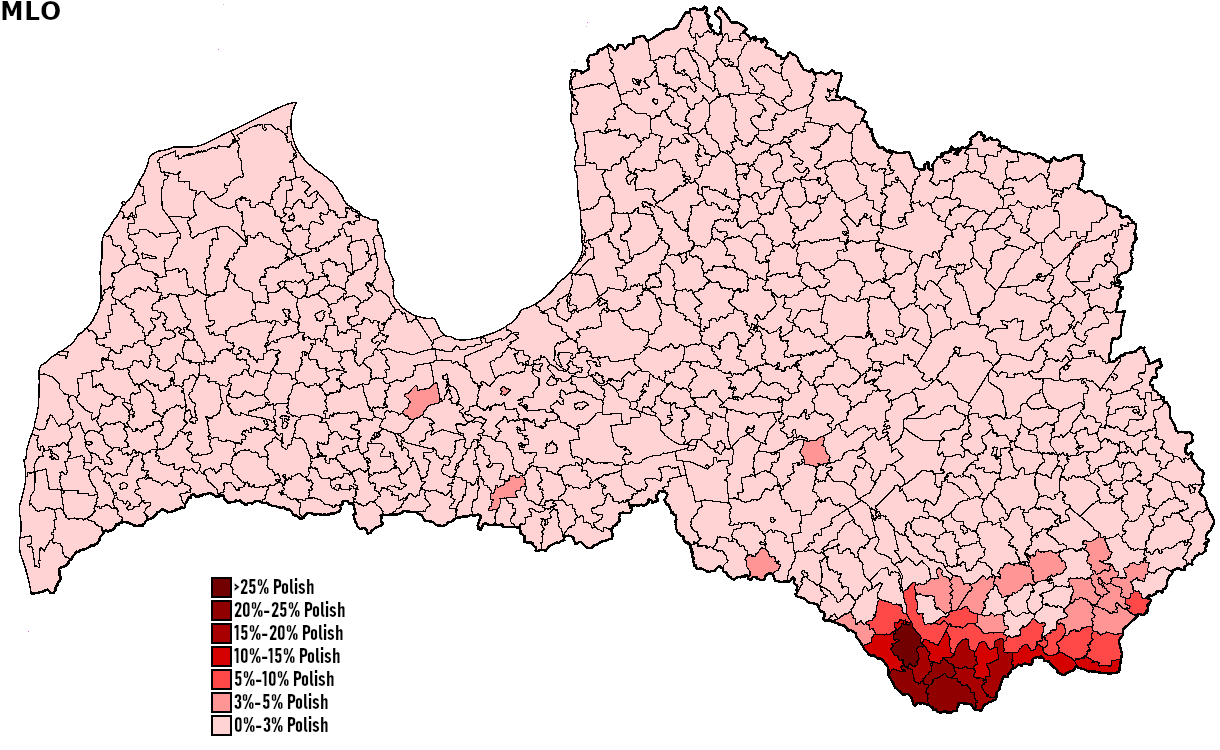
% of Poles in Latvia in 2024

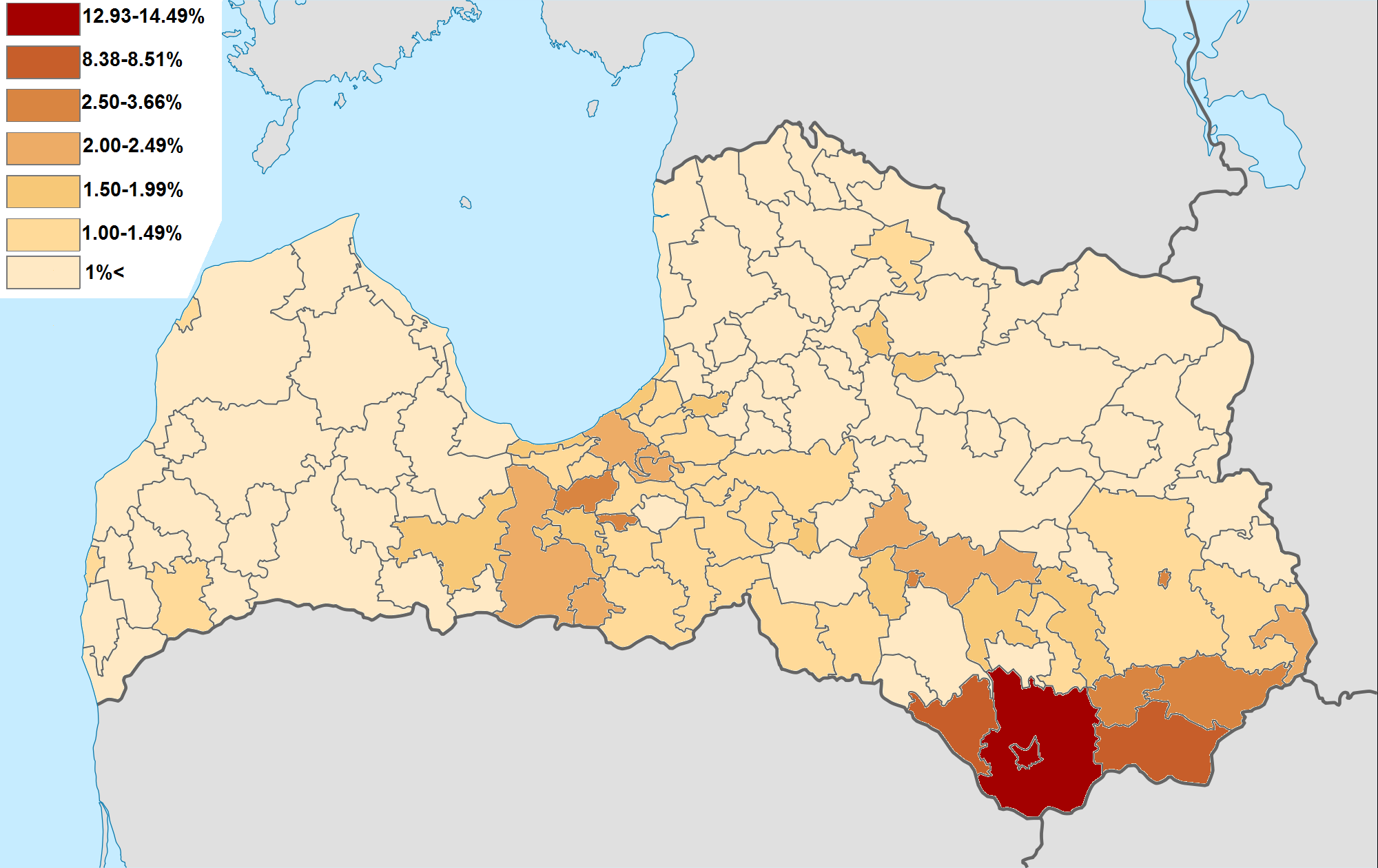
Percentage of ethnic Poles, novadi (municipalities) level divisions of Latvia (2010)

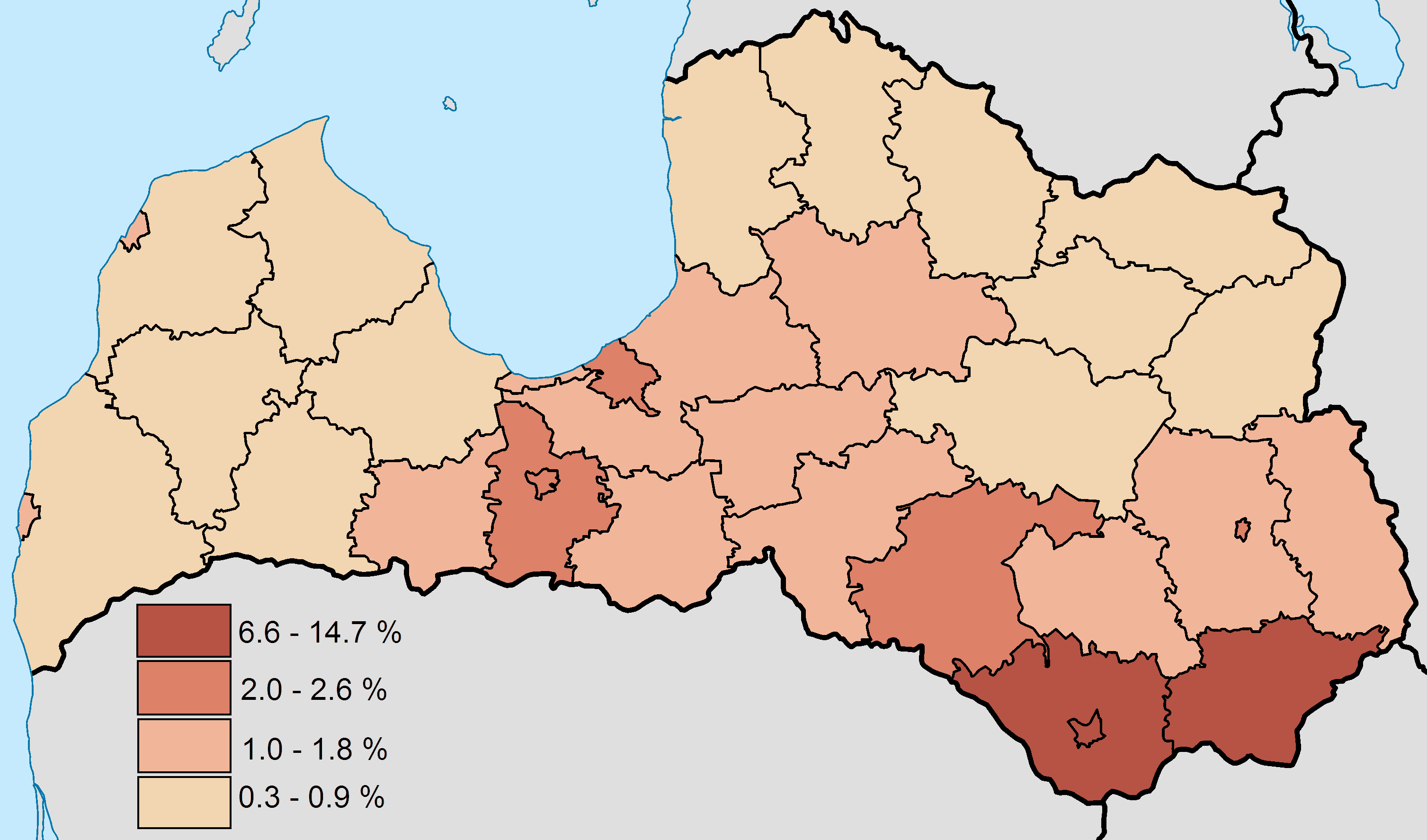
Percentage of ethnic Poles, district level divisions of Latvia (2008)

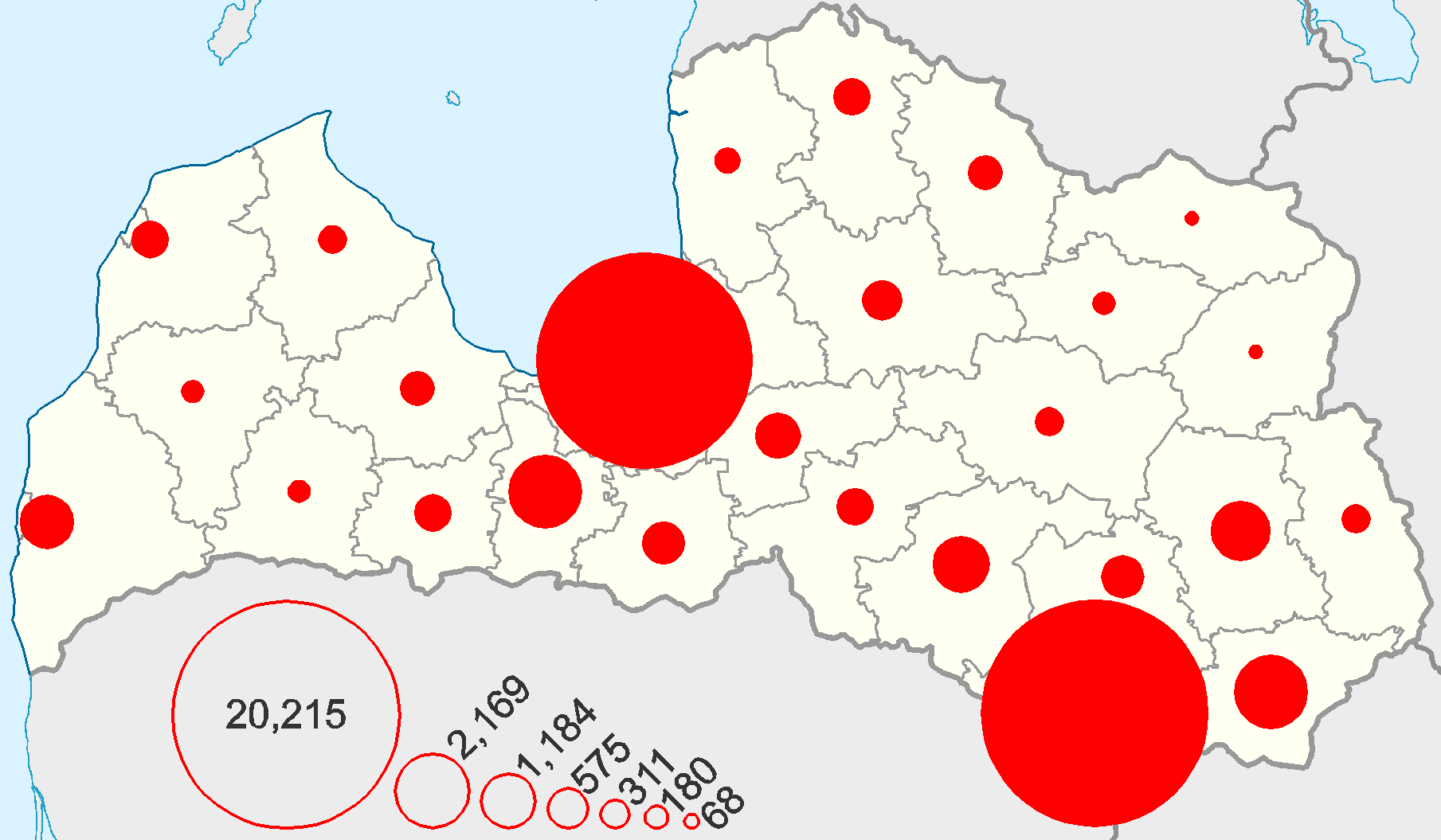
Ethnic Poles distribution, 1st level divisions of Latvia (2008) (cities population of respective districts included)

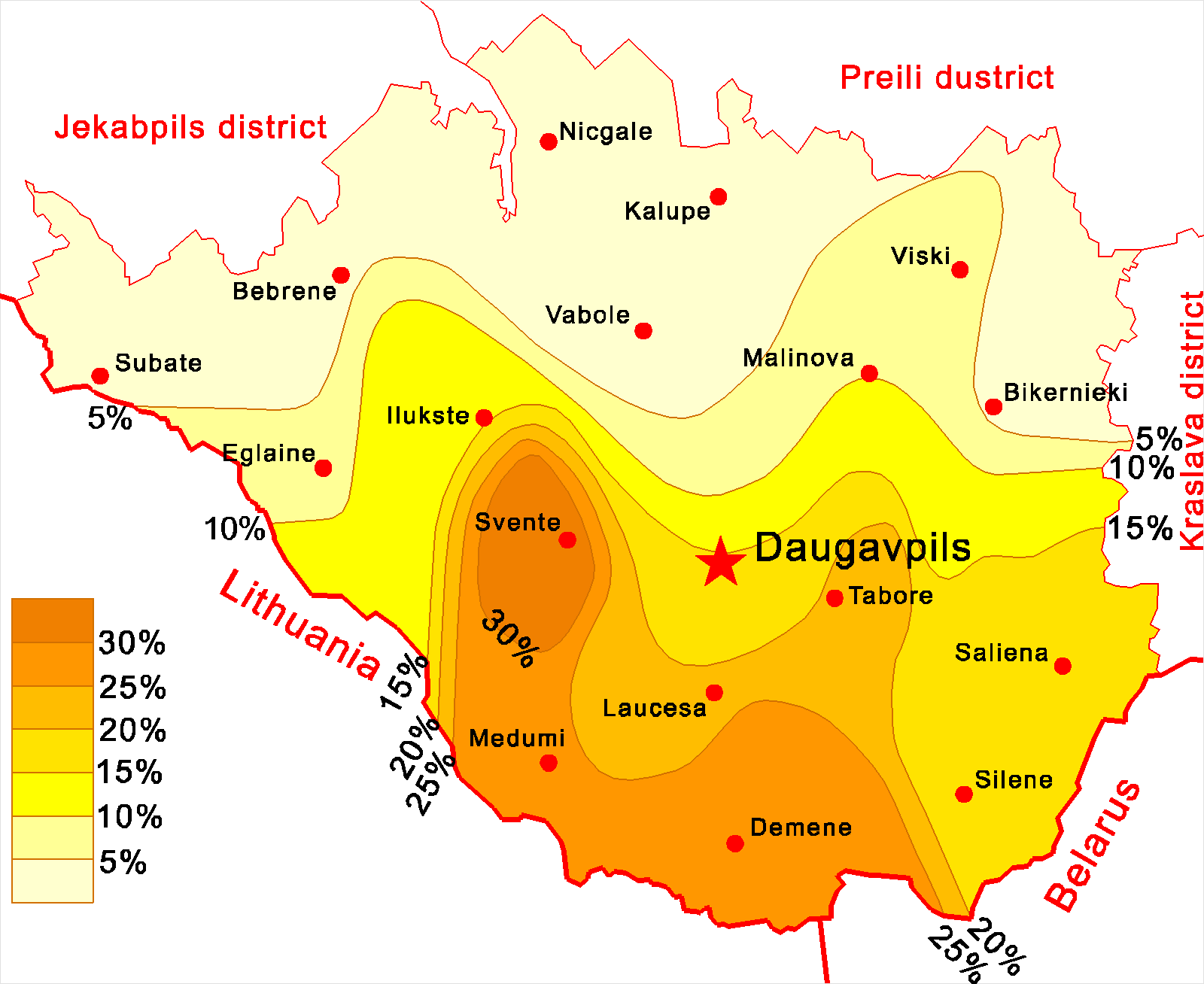
Percentage of ethnic Poles in Daugavpils district (2006)

Ethnic Poles distribution in Latvia
Census year	1989 census		2000 census		2005 est.		2008 est.	
Census year	population	%	population	%	population	%	population	%
Aizkraukle district	590	1.3	608	1.4	572	1.4	537	1.3
Alūksne district	99	0.3	84	0.3	73	0.3	71	0.3
Balvi district	102	0.3	101	0.3	85	0.3	87	0.3
Bauska district	840	1.5	827	1.6	774	1.5	740	1.5
Cēsis district	704	1.1	640	1.0	594	1.0	575	1.0
Daugavpils district	5,294	11.2	5,068	11.9	4,912	12.1	4,609	11.9
Daugavpils city	16,338	13.1	17,209	14.9	16,395	14.9	15,606	14.7
Dobele district	759	1.7	649	1.6	579	1.5	545	1.4
Gulbene district	222	0.7	227	0.8	208	0.8	194	0.7
Jēkabpils district	1,309	2.1	1,368	2.4	1,269	2.4	1,203	2.3
Jelgava district	926	2.4	856	2.3	845	2.3	810	2.2
Jelgava city	1,274	1.7	1,312	2.1	1,336	2.0	1,307	2.0
Jūrmala city	905	1.5	932	1.7	937	1.7	926	1.7
Krāslava district	2,499	6.0	2,441	6.6	2,286	6.6	2,169	6.6
Kuldīga district	252	0.6	205	0.5	185	0.5	180	0.5
Liepāja district	276	0.5	197	0.4	188	0.4	183	0.4
Liepāja city	1,298	1.1	1,120	1.3	1,054	1.2	1,001	1.2
Limbaži district	325	0.8	343	0.9	304	0.8	277	0.7
Ludza district	362	0.9	376	1.1	350	1.1	316	1.0
Madona district	442	0.9	388	0.8	338	0.8	311	0.7
Ogre district	975	1.5	894	1.4	858	1.4	837	1.3
Preiļi district	888	1.9	791	1.9	704	1.8	664	1.8
Rēzekne district	597	1.4	533	1.2	522	1.3	499	1.3
Rēzekne city	1,166	2.7	1,056	2.7	1,002	2.7	928	2.6
Riga district	2,533	1.7	2,685	1.9	2,637	1.7	2,734	1.6
Riga city	16,653	1.8	15,980	2.1	15,094	2.1	14,456	2.0
Saldus district	296	0.7	240	0.6	202	0.5	194	0.5
Talsi district	364	0.7	329	0.7	306	0.6	286	0.6
Tukums district	601	1.0	555	1.0	518	0.9	484	0.9
Valka district	328	0.9	295	0.9	251	0.8	228	0.7
Valmiera district	586	0.9	594	1.0	533	0.9	507	0.9
Ventspils district	97	0.6	77	0.5	73	0.5	68	0.5
Ventspils city	516	1.0	525	1.2	527	1.2	492	1.1

Mixed marriages are common for the ethnic Poles in Latvia: per cent distribution of males with spouse of different ethnicity was 89%, of females with spouse of different ethnicity was 90% (1990–2007)

== Polish organizations in Latvia ==
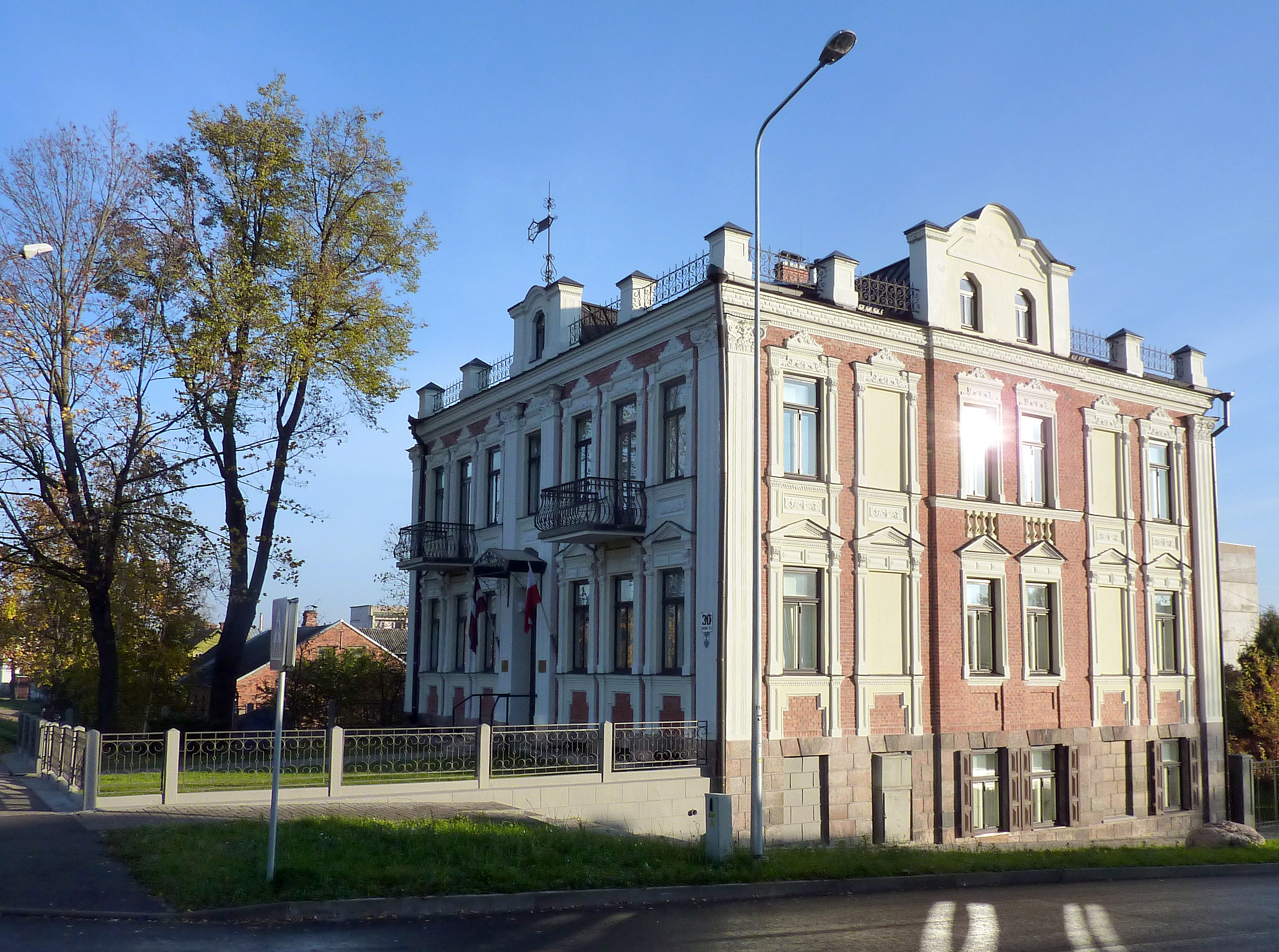
Polish Cultural Center in Daugavpils

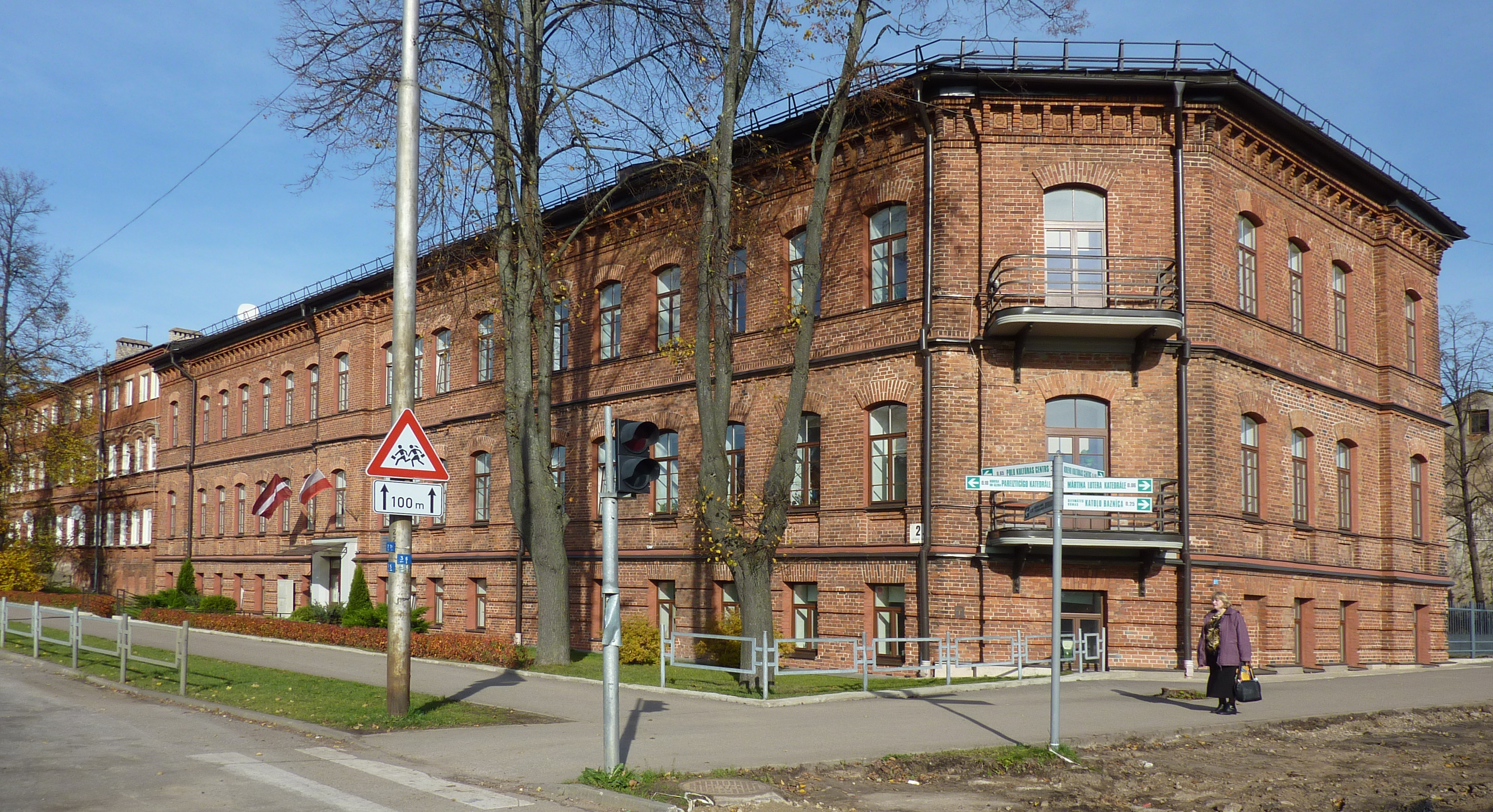
Józef Piłsudski Daugavpils Polish state gymnasium

The largest Polish organization in Latvia is Association of Poles in Latvia (Związek Polaków na Łotwie).

== See also ==
- Latvia–Poland relations
- Polish diaspora
- Immigration to Latvia
- Latvians in Poland
