= Visa requirements for Latvian non-citizens =

Administrative entry restrictions

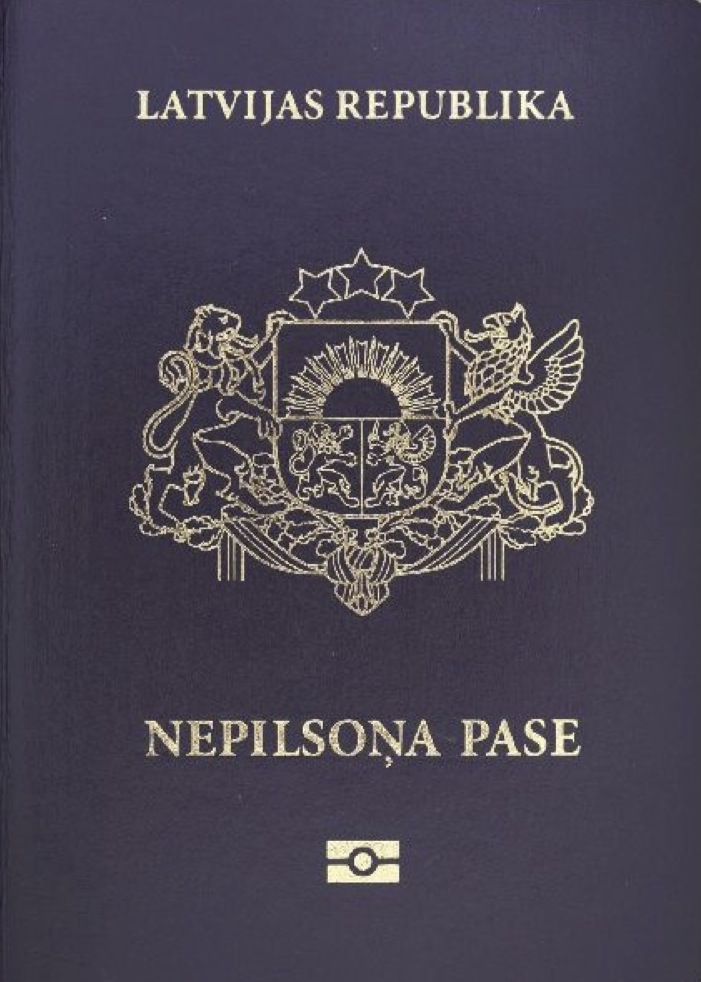
Latvian passport for non-citizens

Visa requirements for Latvian non-citizens are administrative entry restrictions by the authorities of other states placed on Non-citizens of Latvia.

== Visa requirements map ==
Visa requirements for Latvian non-citizens Latvia Visa not required Visa on arrival Visa required prior to arrival

== Visa-free access ==
Non-citizens of Latvia may enter the following countries and territories without a visa:

- (European Union) Schengen Area countries (90 days within 180 days)
- Albania (30 days)
- Andorra (90 days within 180 days)
- Aruba (30) Aruba allows both Citizens and Alien Citizens entry
- Barbados (30) Aruba allows both Citizens and Alien Citizens entry
- Belarus 30 days, must arrive via Minsk International Airport
- Bosnia and Herzegovina (90 days)
- Chile (90 days)
- Costa Rica (90 days within 180 days)
- Cyprus (90 days within 180 days)
- Dominica (21 days)
- Dominican Republic (30 days)
- Ecuador (90 days)
- Georgia (1 year)
- Kosovo (90 days)
- Maldives (30 days)
- Moldova (90 days within 180 days)
- Monaco (90 days within 180 days)
- Montenegro (30 days)
- Panama (6 months)
- Russia (90 days within 180 days)
- Samoa (30 days)
- Saint Lucia (30 days) Persons holding ANY Latvian Passport (citizen or Alien)
- Tunisia (organized travel groups only, 90 days)

== See also ==
- Visa requirements for Latvian citizens
- Latvian passport
- U.S. Passport indicating non-citizen nationals, who usually are American Samoans
