= Latvian identity card =

National identity card of Latvia

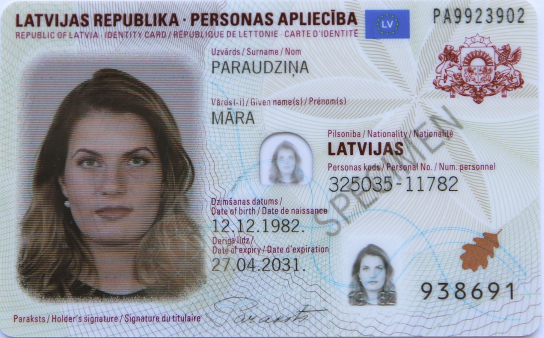
- Front of the card
- Type: identity document
- Issued by: Latvia
- First issued: 2 September 2019
- Purpose: Identification, travel
- Valid in: EFTA; European Union; United Kingdom (EU Settlement Scheme); Rest of Europe (except Belarus, Russia, and Ukraine) Georgia; Montserrat (max. 14 days); Overseas France
- Eligibility: Latvian citizenship
- Expiration: 10 years (age 20 or over); 5 years (age 5–20); 2 years (age 0–5)

The Latvian identity card (Latvian: Personas apliecība), also known as Personal certificate, is an officially recognised biometric identity document issued to Latvian citizens. They are also valid for travel within Europe (except Belarus, Russia, Ukraine and the United Kingdom), Georgia, French Overseas territories, Montserrat (max. 14 days) and organized tours to Tunisia (without the need for a Latvian passport).

The card, same as a passport, is mandatory if a citizen over the age of 15.

== See also ==
- National identity cards in the European Union
- Identity document
