= Latvian nationality law =

Latvian Citizenship Act

Parliament of Latvia
- Long title: An Act relating to Latvian citizenship
- Enacted by: Government of Latvia
- Status: Amended

The Latvian nationality law (Latvian: Pilsonības likums) is based on the Citizenship Law of 1994. It is primarily based on the principles of jus sanguinis.

== History ==
The first nationality law of Latvia was adopted in August, 1919. In September, 1940, the Supreme Soviet of the Soviet Union adopted a decree on the order of receiving USSR citizenship by the citizens of the Latvian, Lithuanian and Estonian SSRs, after the Baltic states had been occupied by the Soviet Union. In October, 1991, the Supreme Council of the Republic of Latvia adopted a resolution "On the renewal of Republic of Latvia citizens' rights and fundamental principles of naturalization" declaring the 1940 decree null and void with regard to Republic of Latvia citizens.

On 2 September 2012, the Central Election Commission received a draft for amendments to the Citizenship Law, providing that, from 1 January 2014, all non-citizens (a status held by former USSR citizens who do not possess citizenship of Latvia or any other state and who do not apply for citizenship while residing in Latvia), who by 30 November 2013 had not applied, under the rules of the Cabinet of Ministers, to retain the status of non-citizen shall be considered to be citizens of Latvia; these amendments would have automatically granted citizenship to any person who might have the status of non-citizen, without regard for place of residence, interest in acquiring citizenship of Latvia, and awareness of the amendments. The Central Election Commission sought opinions from legal experts before making any decision on the admissibility and sufficiency of the popular initiative. The majority of the experts requested were inclined to consider there to have been sound arguments for ceasing organisation of the popular initiative, the Central Election Commission went along with their opinion.

Since January 1, 2020, Latvian citizenship has been granted to all children born in Latvia if the child's parents have the status of a Latvian non-citizen (Alien). Children born in Latvia receive either Latvian citizenship or citizenship of another country if both parents agree on that other citizenship. The default is Latvian citizenship for all children born to Latvian non-citizen (Alien) parents. If the child is born outside Latvia or one of the parents is a citizen of another country, the parents have to submit an application and documents certifying that the child is not and has not been a citizen of any other country in order to be recognized as a Latvian citizen.

== Dual citizenship ==
Dual citizenship is not prohibited by Latvian citizenship law. According to the amendments to the Citizenship Law which came into force on 1 October 2013, citizenship of Latvia may be retained for persons who have acquired the citizenship of:

- another EU Member State or an EFTA Member State;
- another NATO Member State;
- Australia, Brazil or New Zealand;
- such a country with which Latvia has concluded an agreement on the recognition of dual citizenship (no such agreement is currently concluded);
- a country not referred to previously if due to important national interests permission from the Government of Latvia is received to retain dual citizenship;
- a country not referred to previously if it has been acquired automatically (ex lege), through marriage or as a result of adoption.

Children of citizens of Latvia may hold dual citizenship with any country. Some countries, such as Japan, however, do not permit their nationals to also, after reaching adulthood, hold a foreign citizenship. A dual Latvian-Japanese national must declare, to Japan's Ministry of Justice, his or her intention as to which citizenship to keep, before turning 22.

Before October 1, 2013, the newly acquired non-Latvian citizenship is simply not recognized by the Republic of Latvia, with the exception of a transitional clause: Latvia allows dual citizenship for those and their descendants who were forced to leave Latvia during the Soviet or Nazi occupations and adopted another citizenship while away from Latvia. In order to be eligible for dual citizenship, they had to claim it by July 1, 1995. If such a claim is made after this date, they shall renounce the citizenship of another state. If by a law of another state a Latvian citizen may be a citizen of this state, in relations with Latvia this person is considered solely as a Latvian citizen.

In general terms, you might be eligible to get Latvian citizenship by descent and keep existing citizenship (dual citizenship) if:

1. One of your ancestors was a Latvian citizen prior to 1940 (there is no 3 generations rule).
2. They withdrew or were exiled from Latvia during the 1940-1990 period.
3. The applicant was born before 1 October 2014.

The application procedure requires having documents that prove your connection to the family member with Latvian heritage and proof that they withdrew or were exiled. If the ancestors of the applicant left prior to 1940, he/she will still be able to qualify for citizenship, but will not qualify to have dual citizenship.

== Travel Freedom & Quality of Nationality ==
In 2017, the Latvian nationality is ranked twenty-third in the Nationality Index (QNI). The QNI considers travel freedom and internal factors such as peace & stability, economic strength, and human development as well.

== Citizenship of the European Union ==
Because Latvia forms part of the European Union, Latvian citizens are also citizens of the European Union under European Union law and thus enjoy rights of free movement and have the right to vote in elections for the European Parliament. When in a non-EU country where there is no Latvian embassy, Latvian citizens have the right to get consular protection from the embassy of any other EU country present in that country. Latvian citizens can live and work in any country within the EU as a result of the right of free movement and residence granted in Article 21 of the EU Treaty.

== See also ==
- Non-citizens (Latvia)
- Visa requirements for Latvian citizens
