= Non-citizens (Latvia) =

Individuals resident in Latvia who have the right to a Latvian non-citizen passport

"Non-citizens" (Latvian: nepilsoņi) in Latvian law are individuals who are not citizens of Latvia or any other country, but who, in accordance with the Latvian law "Regarding the status of citizens of the former USSR who possess neither Latvian nor another citizenship," have the right to a non-citizen passport issued by the Latvian government as well as other specific rights. Approximately two thirds of them are ethnic Russians, followed by Belarusians, Ukrainians, Poles, and Lithuanians. Latvian government has stated that “Latvian non-citizens are not stateless persons as they are regarded as Latvian nationals and are under full protection of the state in Latvia and abroad". This is further backed by the Latvian Constitutional Court and the Latvian Immigration Law that stress that Latvian "non-citizens" are not to be considered as aliens or foreigners, and that people who hold the status have a permanent legal and national bond.

The non-citizens are "citizens of the former USSR (...) who reside in the Republic of Latvia as well as who are in temporary absence and their children who simultaneously comply with the following conditions: 1) on 1 July 1992 they were registered in the territory of Latvia regardless of the status of the living space indicated in the registration of residence, or up to 1 July 1992 their last registered place of residence was in the Republic of Latvia, or it has been determined by a court judgment that they have resided in the territory of Latvia for 10 consecutive years until the referred to date; 2) they are not citizens of Latvia; and 3) they are not and have not been citizens of another state."

Thousands of Latvian children have been born into the Latvian "non-citizen" status under the circumstance of "if both of their parents were non-citizens at the time of the birth of the children or one of the parents is a non-citizen, but the other is a stateless person or is unknown, or in accordance with the mutual agreement of the parents, if one of the parents is a non-citizen, but the other – a citizen of another country."

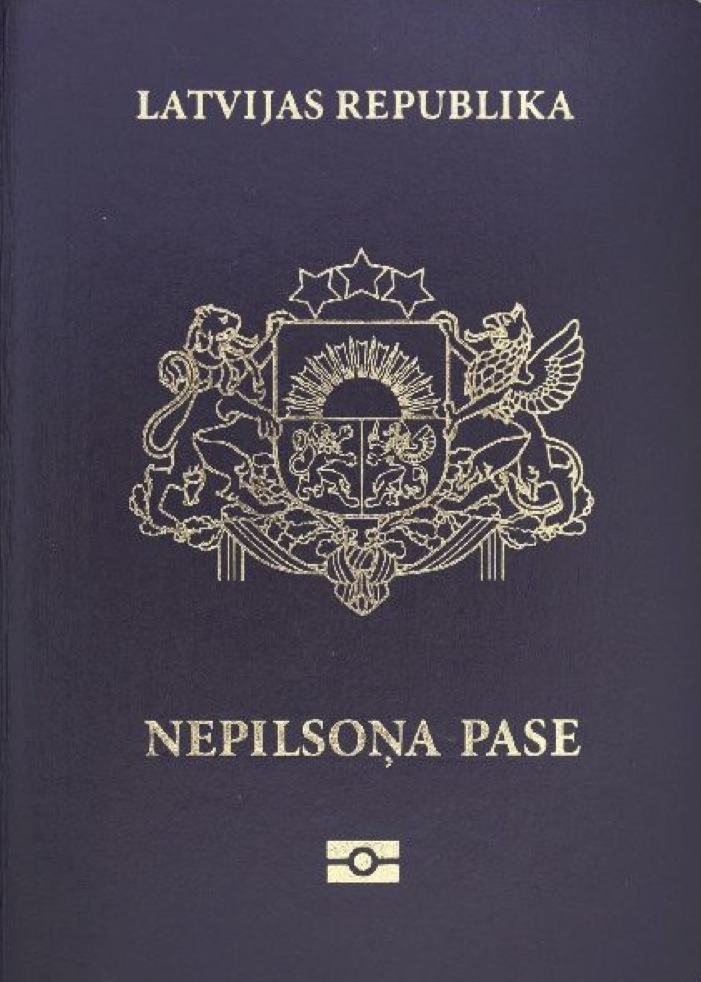
Latvian non-citizen's passport (2011).

Children born after Latvia reestablished independence (August 21, 1991) to parents who are both non-citizens were entitled to citizenship upon request of either parent until 2020 (under specific conditions). Since January 1, 2020, Latvian citizenship is allowed to all children born in Latvia, even if their parents are non–citizens. Children born in Latvia receive either Latvian citizenship or the citizenship of another country if both parents agree on that other citizenship. If the child is born outside Latvia or one of the parents is a citizen of another country, the parents have to submit an application and documents certifying that the child is not and has not been a citizen of any other country in order to be recognized as a Latvian citizen.

Sources such as Amnesty International have described this non-citizen status as tantamount to statelessness. The European Commission "regrets that the situation of non-citizens has not been resolved during the entry negotiations between Latvia and Estonia and the EU." While referring to non-citizens in Latvia and Estonia as stateless, the European Commission admits that the status of non-citizen in both countries may be unique and without previous precedent in international law. Although the status of Baltic "non-citizens" is often described as unique, it is comparable to many other statuses of second-class citizenship or sub-citizenship. For example, American Samoans who are non-citizens of the United States.

Latvia contends that there are few differences in rights between Latvian non-citizens and Latvian citizens, but the country passed eighty domestic laws that severely curtail the rights of people with non-citizen status. Non-citizen minorities are denied minority and political rights, barred from working in over thirty professions, restricted in their freedom of movement, excluded from EU citizenship rights, and subjected to numerous other restrictions. Latvian citizens can travel visa-free to 157 countries outside the EU, while Latvian non-citizens have access to only 19 and sometimes face arbitrary problems in travel.

The "non-citizens" of Latvia are permitted to travel to Russia without a visa, a right not afforded to Latvian citizens (see Visa requirements for Latvian non-citizens). However, the "non-citizens" are allowed to stay in other Schengen Area countries for no more than 90 days within any 180-day period (whereas Latvian citizens can stay indefinitely in any Schengen or EU country). Moreover, the "non-citizens" cannot legally work in other EU countries without a work permit.

== Demography ==
Citizenship of Latvian residents (Population Register, July 2023)
Citizens of Latvia (1,725,879)	84.18%
Non-citizens of Latvia (183,796)	8.96%
Citizens of Russia (48,833)	2.38%
Citizens of Ukraine (8,513)	0.42%
Citizens of Lithuania (5,140)	0.25%
Citizens of Belarus (4,353)	0.21%
Others, mainly citizens of other countries (73,800)	3.6%

According to the population census, in March 2011, there were 290,660 non-citizens living in Latvia or 14.1% of Latvian residents, down from approximately 715,000 in 1991. According to the Population Register, in January 2011, 326,735 non-citizens resided in Latvia.

The data of the Population Register, as of January 2022, showed 195,159 non-citizens living in Latvia (9.56% of residents). By far the largest ethnic group of all non-citizens are Russians, who make up 65.5% of all non-citizens, 13.7% are Belarusians, 9.9% are Ukrainians, 3,5% are Poles and 2,4% are Lithuanians. Among the largest ethnic groups in Latvia 0,04% of all ethnic Latvians are non-citizens, as are 26% of Russians, 45% of Belarusians, 41% of Ukrainians, 17% of Poles, 20% of Lithuanians, 22% of Jews, 4% of Roma and 17% of Germans. Additionally, 4,397 non-citizens were registered as living outside of Latvia.

In the age group below 18, non-citizens form 2.1% of residents; among adults - 14.2%; in the age group above 90, 25.0%, as of 2015. As of 2020, the majority of non-citizens, 62.3%, live in the three biggest cities of the country: Riga, Daugavpils and Liepāja, which comprise 41.3% of the Latvian population. As of January 2016, 42.92% of the non-citizens were born in Latvia.

The referendum held in October 1998 eliminated the "windows" system, which limited the age groups allowed to naturalize each year. It also gave the right to children of non-citizens born in Latvia after August 21, 1991, to be registered as citizens without naturalisation barring imprisonment or other citizenship. Parents can request citizenship for their children until the age of 15, after which a child can make the request on their own behalf from the age of 15 to 17.

Since January 1, 2020, Latvian citizenship is granted automatically to all children born in Latvia no matter what status their parents have (citizens or non–citizens). Children born in Latvia will receive either Latvian citizenship or the citizenship of another country if both parents agree on that other citizenship. The default will be Latvian citizenship for all children born to Latvia-resident parents. If the child is born outside Latvia or one of the parents is a citizen of another country, the parents have to submit an application and documents certifying that the child is not and has not been a citizen of any other country in order to be recognized as a Latvian citizen.

== Status ==
According to the Constitutional Court of Latvia,

15. After the passing of the Non-Citizen Law a new, up to that time unknown category of persons appeared – Latvian non-citizens. Latvian non-citizens cannot be compared with any other status of a physical entity, which has been determined in international legal acts, as the rate of rights, established for non-citizens, which does not comply with any other status. Latvian non-citizens can be regarded neither as citizens, nor aliens or stateless persons but as persons with "a specific legal status" (..) 17. (..) the rights and international liabilities, determined for the non-citizens testify that the legal ties of non-citizens with Latvia are to a certain extent recognized and mutual obligations and rights have been created on the basis of the above

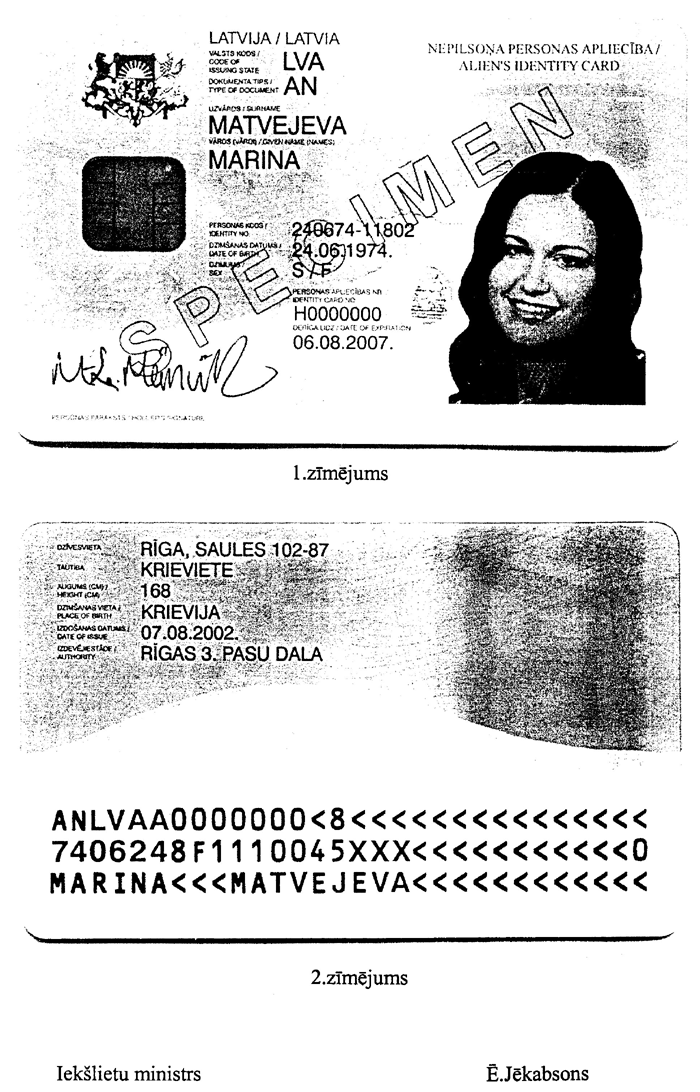
Official specimen of the Alien's Identity Card (2007).

The Latvian parliament created the category of non-citizen in 1991 when it affirmed legal continuity with Latvia's original citizenship laws. Individuals who were citizens of Latvia as of June 17, 1940, prior to Soviet occupation, were once again recognized as citizens, along with their descendants. The law also grants citizenship to all permanent residents of Latvia, who do not hold another citizenship and are either Latvians or Livonians, or individuals (along with their children up to age 15), who have completed universal primary or secondary education with Latvian as the language of instruction. That effectively limited non-citizen status to largely Russophones arriving during the Soviet era. Notably this included some of those that had elected the parliament in question.

To deal with the issue of former Soviet citizens without Latvian citizenship, the law On the Status of those Former USSR Citizens who do not have the Citizenship of Latvia or that of any Other State was adopted in 1995 as a temporary measure pending the resolution of changing citizenship regimes in the now independent former Soviet republics.

The issue of non-citizens has been equated to the problem of statelessness. Non-citizens have been described as stateless by the OSCE Parliamentary Assembly and by Amnesty International. Non-citizens are named as an example of problems of statelessness by Commissioner for Human Rights, although conceding that non-citizens may not prefer citizenship for their children, and the UN Special Rapporteur on contemporary forms of racism, racial discrimination, xenophobia and related intolerance recommends Latvia "revisit the existing requirements for naturalization with the objective of facilitating the granting of citizenship to non-citizens, implementing the commitments established by the 1961 Convention on the Reduction of Statelessness." Latvian Ombudsman Romāns Apsītis has considered the "specific legal status" of non-citizens to be questionable from the viewpoint of international law.

By definition in Latvian law, non-citizens are not stateless. While they have rights akin to citizens, for example, the right to reside in Latvia without visas or temporary residence permits, rights in other areas are curtailed. Non-citizens cannot vote, although they can participate to a lesser degree in public policy through NGOs. Pension rights are limited, and non-citizens cannot hold certain positions in local and national government, the civil service, and other governmental entities. Non-citizens are exempt from military service, which was compulsory for male Latvian citizens until 2006. UN Committee on the Elimination of Racial Discrimination described non-citizens' position as discriminatory in 1999.

With regard to international law, non-citizens are not considered stateless by the EU Network of Independent Experts on Fundamental Rights, which notes:

... in Latvia, non-citizens under the 1995 Law on Status of citizens of the former USSR who are not citizens of Latvia or any other country are neither citizens, nor foreigners, nor stateless persons. A great proportion of the large Russian-speaking population of the country falls within this category, unknown in public international law. The same applies to non-citizens in Estonia.

The rights of Latvian non-citizens outside of Latvia are governed strictly by treaty. For example, non-citizens now travel visa-free in the EU under Schengen just as Latvian citizens do; both have access to Latvian consular services abroad. (Citizens of foreign countries residing in Latvia do not enjoy this privilege.) Outside the EU, numerous countries allow visa-free travel for Latvian citizens but not for non-citizens.

Peter Van Elsuwege, a scholar in European law at Ghent University, states that the Latvian law is grounded upon the established legal principle that persons who settle under the rule of an occupying power gain no automatic right to nationality. A number of historic precedents support this, according to Van Elsuwege, most notably the case of Alsace-Lorraine when the French on recovering the territory in 1918 did not grant citizenship to German settlers despite Germany having annexed the territory 47 years earlier in 1871.

== Naturalisation ==
Non-citizens may naturalize provided that they have been permanent residents of Latvia for at least 5 years, demonstrate Latvian language competency, correctly answer questions regarding Latvia's Constitution and history—including that it was occupied by the Soviet Union (a question debated in Latvian Russian press) and know the words to the Latvian national anthem. Former members of foreign military (like the Soviet Army), people convicted of propagating fascist or communist ideas or inciting ethnic hatred, and individuals considered hostile to the Republic of Latvia cannot be granted citizenship. The government can refuse naturalisation to individuals who have fulfilled requirements if they are found to be disloyal. This was challenged by Petropavlovskis v. Latvia at the European Court of Human Rights, but in 2015 the court unanimously decided that such refusals are legal.

As of June 30, 2010, 134,039 people have been naturalized, mostly former non-citizens. The naturalization rate reached its height over 2004–2006, peaking in 2005 (19 169 naturalized), and has fallen off substantially since then across all ethnic categories (2080 naturalized in 2009).

A survey conducted and published in 2003 by the Naturalization Board indicated that categories of non-citizen most likely to naturalize were: socially active, aged 25 to 50, female, completed higher education, employees in local or national government, and anyone living in Riga and its environs. The factors cited as to why people have not pursued citizenship were:

1. 34.2% — people deserve citizenship automatically
2. 26.2% — hoping naturalization will be simplified
3. 26.2% — travel to the Commonwealth of Independent States is easier for non-citizens
4. 23.5% — concerns about passing the Latvian competency test
5. 21.6% — no particular need
6. 20.5% — concerns about passing the Latvian history test
7. 20.2% — cost of fees
8. 18.1% — not enough time
9. 17.9% — naturalization is demeaning
10. Less than 9% — preference for citizenship other than Latvian

== Politics of citizenship ==
The Popular Front of Latvia supported the notion that long-term residents of Latvia who declare their will to obtain citizenship of Latvia and clearly connect their destiny with the state should become citizens.

According to SKDS research, in 2005 45.9% of inhabitants (but only 38.4% of citizens) supported granting voting rights for non-citizens at municipal elections, against such amendments were 35.6% of inhabitants (and 42.8% of citizens). 74.6% of Russian-speaking respondents and 24.8% of ethnic Latvian respondents expressed support for this idea, a negative attitude to it was shown by 7.8% of Russian-speaking respondents and 55.9% of ethnic Latvian respondents.

As of 2007, the Harmony Party supported making naturalization and citizenship for some categories of non-citizens easier to obtain. The Latvian Russian Union, supportive of these steps, also supported the idea of a "zero option", or giving citizenship for all "non-citizens" unconditionally. On the other side, the National Alliance called for a halt to naturalization in 2006. Most of the ruling parties supported the status quo. LPP and LC claimed in 2007, that they support voting rights for non-citizens in local elections, but offered a referendum on the issue in 2009, to be held at the same time as local elections, and did not support the respective proposals in Parliament as of 2007.

The international community expresses slightly different views on the question. The OSCE mission monitoring the 2006 parliamentary elections mentioned that

Approximately 400,000 people in Latvia, some 18 per cent of the total population, had not obtained Latvian or any other citizenship and therefore still had the status of "non-citizens". In the vast majority of cases, those were persons who migrated to Latvia from within the former Soviet Union, and their descendants. Non-citizens do not have the right to vote in any Latvian elections, although they can join political parties. To obtain citizenship, these persons must go through a naturalization process, which over 50,000 persons have done since the 2002 Saeima election. The OSCE claimed that the fact that a significant percentage of the adult population did not hold voting rights represented a continuing democratic deficit.

A resolution of the Parliamentary Assembly of the Council of Europe in November 2006 found:

The Assembly considers that the naturalisation regulations adopted in Latvia do not raise insuperable obstacles to the acquisition of Latvian nationality and that the applicable procedure does not entail any requirements that are excessive or contrary to existing European standards. However, when it comes to the very specific situation of non-citizens, which is unprecedented and therefore lacks a reference framework of European norms or practices, the Assembly considers that further improvements are possible to avoid unnecessary requirements for the acquisition of Latvian nationality.

International recommendations to Latvia, which concern non-citizenship, include:

- granting voting rights for non-citizens in local elections;
- facilitating naturalization;
- reducing differences in rights between citizens and non-citizens;
- avoiding asking those applying for naturalization to express convictions that are contrary to their reading of the history of their cultural community or nation.

The Russian Foreign Ministry has regularly charged Latvia with serious violations of the rights of its Russophone population, describing non-citizens as "stateless" in 2004. In responding to charges of discrimination, Latvian authorities contended there is little practical difference between citizens and non-citizens, the primary ones being that non-citizens cannot vote and that non-citizens are exempt from military service.

The Russian Foreign Office has published a collection of international recommendations to Latvia concerning the minority rights, including those on the non-citizenship issue. Russia itself has allowed most Latvian non-citizens short trips without visas since June 2008. This step was criticized by Latvian MFA, but welcomed by the Secretary-General of CoE T. Davis. Earlier, Latvian citizens were charged more for a Russian single-entry visa than non-citizens (more than five times the fee as of December 2007) seen by T. Malmlof as rewarding if not encouraging statelessness.

=== Council of Europe ===
As reported by the European Commissioner for Human Rights 2007 report on Latvia, in 2006 there were 411,054 non-citizens, 66.5% of them belonging to the Russian minority (per §30). While applications of children born after August 21, 1991, are reviewed under a simplified procedure, "over 13 000 children are still non-citizens, and, children are still being born as non-citizens" (per §37,38). Commissioner has noted that "the exclusion of non-citizens from political life does nothing to encourage their integration" (§43). As reported, "the continued existence of the status of non-citizen" mostly held by representatives of national minorities is "deeply problematic in terms of real or perceived equality and social cohesion" (§29).

The Commissioner noted that not all non-citizens may wish to gain citizenship status. His report also contained clarifications provided by the Latvian government in response, including:

- re §30. As of "2007 there are 386 632 non-citizens in Latvia, less than 17% of the population of Latvia." The Latvian government claims the report inappropriately conflates Russophones into one minority as only 28.2% of the population is ethnic Russian and more than half (56.6%) are citizens. Latvia asserts that it is devoted to strengthening all minorities including ones which suffered under Russification, e.g., Ukrainians and Belarusians.
- re §43. NGOs and all members of society can participate in policy-making. "Consultative support for national minority NGOs has been ensured.... The Latvian authorities do not consider that granting voting rights at local level to non-citizens in Latvia would strengthen the incentive to naturalise; the contrary is much more likely. In fact, an extensive research project entitled The effect of regional aspects on tackling citizenship issues carried out by the Naturalisation Board revealed that one of the major obstacles for applying for Latvian citizenship is the lack of motivation, including the negligible differences between the rights of citizens and non-citizens. Latvia prefers having many citizens with full rights to having many non-citizens with many rights, at the same time acknowledging that any restrictions must have strong justification and shall be in accordance with international standards. Furthermore, there are no international standards on voting rights to non-citizens and at present it is not a widely accepted practice among the CoE Member States. In Latvia, it is a constitutional matter."

The Commissioner attributed that there are still large numbers of non-citizens, particularly with regard to children, to "lack of commitment" on the part of Latvian authorities, whose response was that Latvia is materially committed to the rights of its minorities, and that from a practical standpoint there is little additional benefit and motivation to become a citizen versus remaining a non-citizen.

== See also ==
- Russians in Latvia
- Poles in Latvia
- Visa requirements for Latvian non-citizens
- Andrejeva v. Latvia, a court case concerning the calculation of retirement pensions for non-citizens of Latvia
- Estonian nationality law
- Non-citizen US Nationals - American Samoans, who are US nationals but not US citizens.
- Izbrisani
