= National security of Bulgaria =

This article covers national and international security issues in Bulgaria.

== Internal threats ==
In the early 2000s, Bulgarian and international authorities recognized organized crime and corruption as grave ongoing problems exacerbated by Bulgaria's geographic location along major international smuggling lines. In 2003 Bulgaria adopted a National Drugs Strategy for the period 2003–8, modeled on the European Union (EU) strategy. As of mid-2005, an interministerial anticorruption commission, established in 2002, had not reduced corruption to the satisfaction of the EU. Prosecution of organized crime figures, who are known to operate sophisticated networks in Bulgaria, has been rare. Domestic violence against women and organized trafficking in women are considered serious problems. However, between 2001 and 2004 the overall crime rate decreased.

== See also ==
- Foreign relations of Bulgaria
