= Bulgaria–India relations =

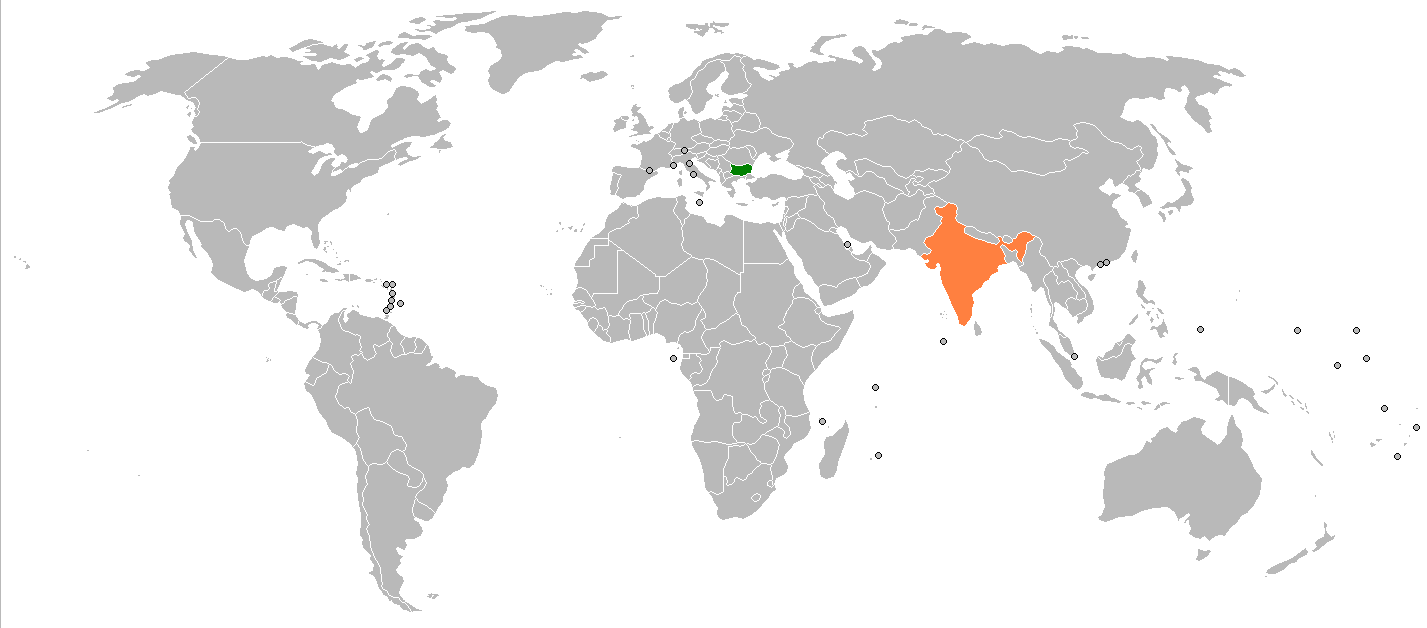

- Bulgaria: India

Diplomatic mission
- Embassy of India, Sofia: Embassy of Bulgaria, New Delhi

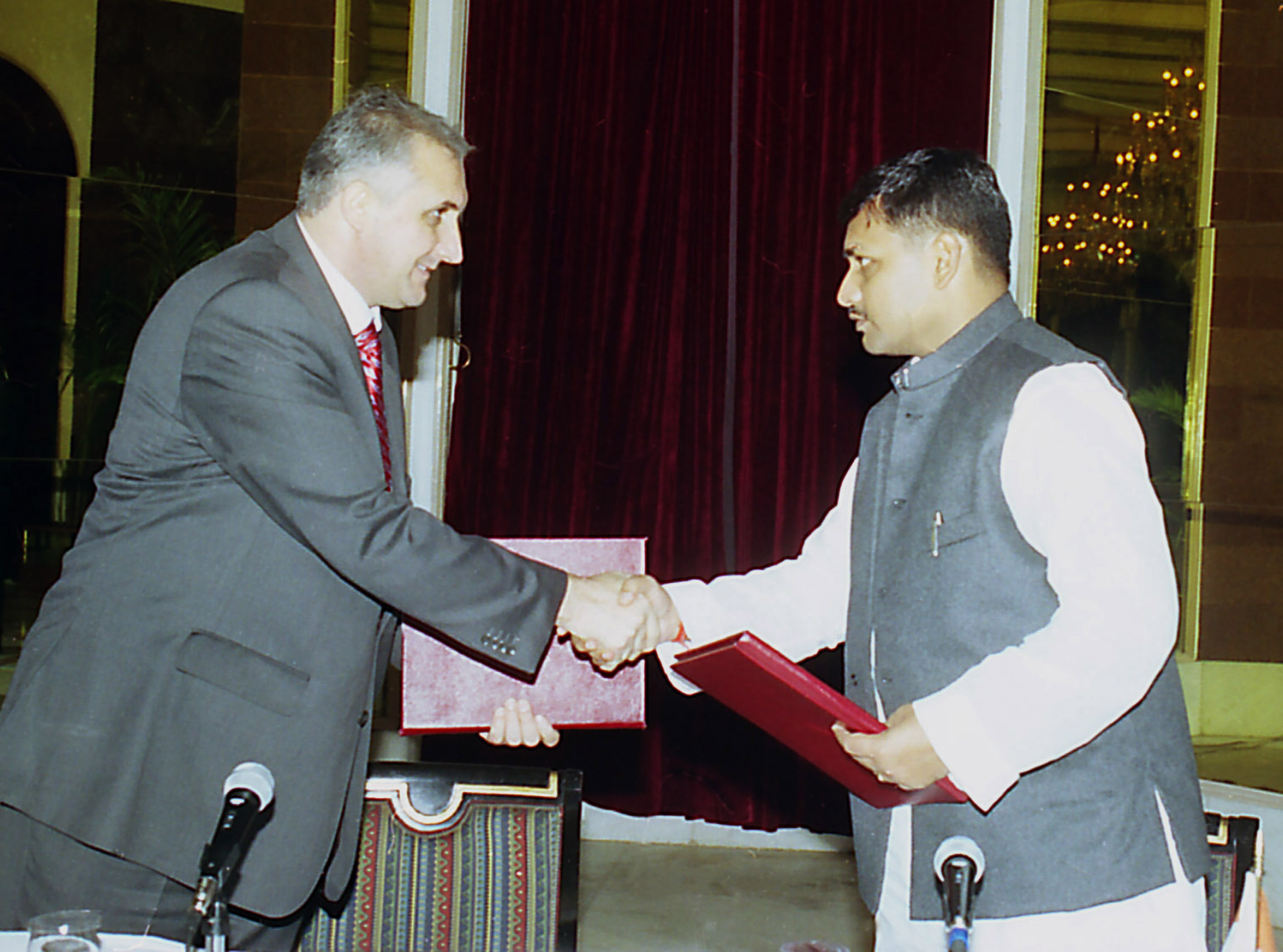
A Still of Agreed Minutes at the conclusion of 15th session of the Indo - Bulgarian Joint Commission on Economic, Scientific, Technological Cooperation (IRIGC) in New Delhi on November 19, 2004

Bulgaria–India relations, also known as the Indo–Bulgarian relations, are the international relations that exist between the Republic of Bulgaria and the Republic of India.

Bulgaria has an embassy in New Delhi and honorary consulates in Hyderabad, Kolkata, and Mumbai. The embassy is jointly accredited to Bangladesh, Nepal, Sri Lanka, the Maldives, and Bhutan, and also observes the South Asian Association for Regional Cooperation (SAARC). India has an embassy in Sofia that is also jointly accredited to North Macedonia.

== History ==
In 1954, preliminary negotiations were held between Bulgaria and India in Moscow, and diplomatic relations were established in December 1954.

Bulgaria opened a diplomatic mission (Legation) in New Delhi in April 1955. The mission was re-organised into an embassy in March 1961. India's diplomatic representatives to Bulgaria resided in Belgrade and Bucharest from July 1955 to April 1970. India opened its embassy in Sofia in May 1970.

Indira Gandhi was the first Indian Prime Minister to visit Bulgaria in October 1967; Todor Zhivkov was the first Bulgarian Prime Minister to visit India in January 1969. Gandhi visited Bulgaria again in 1981. Presidents V. V. Giri visited Bulgaria in 1976, Sanjiva Reddy in 1980, S. D. Sharma in 1994, and A.P.J. Abdul Kalam in 2003. Zhivkov visited India again in 1976 and 1983. Bulgarian President Peter Stoyanov visited in 1998, Prime Minister Stanko Todorov visited India in 1974 and 1980, and Prime Minister Sergei Stanishev visited in 2007.

The first bilateral protocol for trade exchange was signed between the two countries in New Delhi on 16 September 1956, and the first agreement for economic, scientific and technical cooperation was signed in Sofia on 2 May 1967. A Joint Commission for Economic, Scientific & Technical Cooperation (with sub-branches for machine-building, electronics, agriculture, chemistry, defense industry, food industry, etc.) was established in November 1973. In 1975, the first cultural agreement between Bulgaria and India was signed.

In 2020, Bulgarian PM Boyko Borissov recorded a video message to Indian prime minister Narendra Modi on the occasion of International Yoga Day.

Bilateral trade between Bulgaria and India totaled $338.09 million between 2018 and 2019.

In March 2024, the Indian Navy rescued the Bulgarian-owned bulk carrier MV Ruen and its crew including 7 Bulgarian nationals, who had been captured by Somali pirates 3 months earlier. Bulgaria's deputy prime minister Mariya Gabriel thanked India for the action.

== Economic Relations ==
Year	India's Exports to Bulgaria (in US$ millions)	India's Imports from Bulgaria (in US$ millions)	Total Bilateral Trade (in US$ million)
2013-2014	168.10	93.65	261.75
2014-2015	266.45	103.66	370.11
2015-2016	145.53	93.72	239.26
2016-2017	239.53	182.22	421.75
2017-2018	173.24	141.94	315.18
2018-2019	212.43	125.66	338.09
2019-2020 (Up to November)	110.04	100.86	210.90

== Bilateral Treaties and Agreements ==
India and Bulgaria together signed agreements on Tourism, Avoidance of Double Taxation, Combating Organized Crime, International Terrorism and Illicit Trafficking in Narcotics and Psychotropic substances, Protocol on Foreign Office Consultations, Bilateral Investment Promotion and Protection Agreement, Air Services Agreement, Defence Cooperation, Science and Technology, Extradition, Cooperation in Youth Affairs and Sports, Information Technologies, Economic Cooperation, Treaty on Mutual Legal Assistance in Criminal Matters, Treaty on Mutual Legal Assistance in Civil and Commercial Matters, Treaty on the Transfer of Sentenced Persons, Protocol for Amending the Agreement for the Promotion and Protection of Investment, Protocol of Intent on Labour Relations, Employment and Social Security, Small and Medium-Sized Enterprises Development, abolition of visa requirement for holders of Diplomatic and Official Passports, Programme of Cooperation in the field of Science & Technology, Programme of Cooperation in the field of Health and Medicine and Programme for Cooperation in the Fields of Science, Education and Culture, Civil Nuclear Cooperation etc.

== Cultural relations ==
Until 2020, the two countries had signed 17 cultural exchange programmes and the last one was signed in New Delhi in March 2018 for the period 2018–20. The important milestone in developing literary relationship between India and Bulgaria was Nobel Prize winner Rabindranath Tagore’s visit to Bulgaria in 1926. Indian classics like Ramayana, Mahabharata, Vedas, Upanishads, Bhagavat Gita and Panchatantra stories and modern authors like Prem Chand, Mulk Raj Anand, Amrita Pritam etc. are very popular among Bulgarians. Similarly, literary works of Bulgarian poets like Hristo Botev, Hristo Smirnenski, Nikola Vaptsarov are widely translated to Indian languages. Katya Tosheva, a Bulgarian practices Yoga, an ancient Indian exercise and mastered the Indian classical dances of Bharatnatyam, Kathak and Odissi.

As a part of the Centre for Eastern Languages and Cultures, Sofia University has an Indology Department. To promote the implementation of Indology in diverse ways and at different levels, East-West Indological Foundation was established in 1997. Indian embassy in Bulgaria actively organizes a number of high-profile cultural events.

== Resident diplomatic missions ==
- Bulgaria has an embassy in New Delhi.
- India has an embassy in Sofia.

== See also ==
- Foreign relations of Bulgaria
- Foreign relations of India
- Embassy of India, Sofia
