= Bulgaria–China relations =

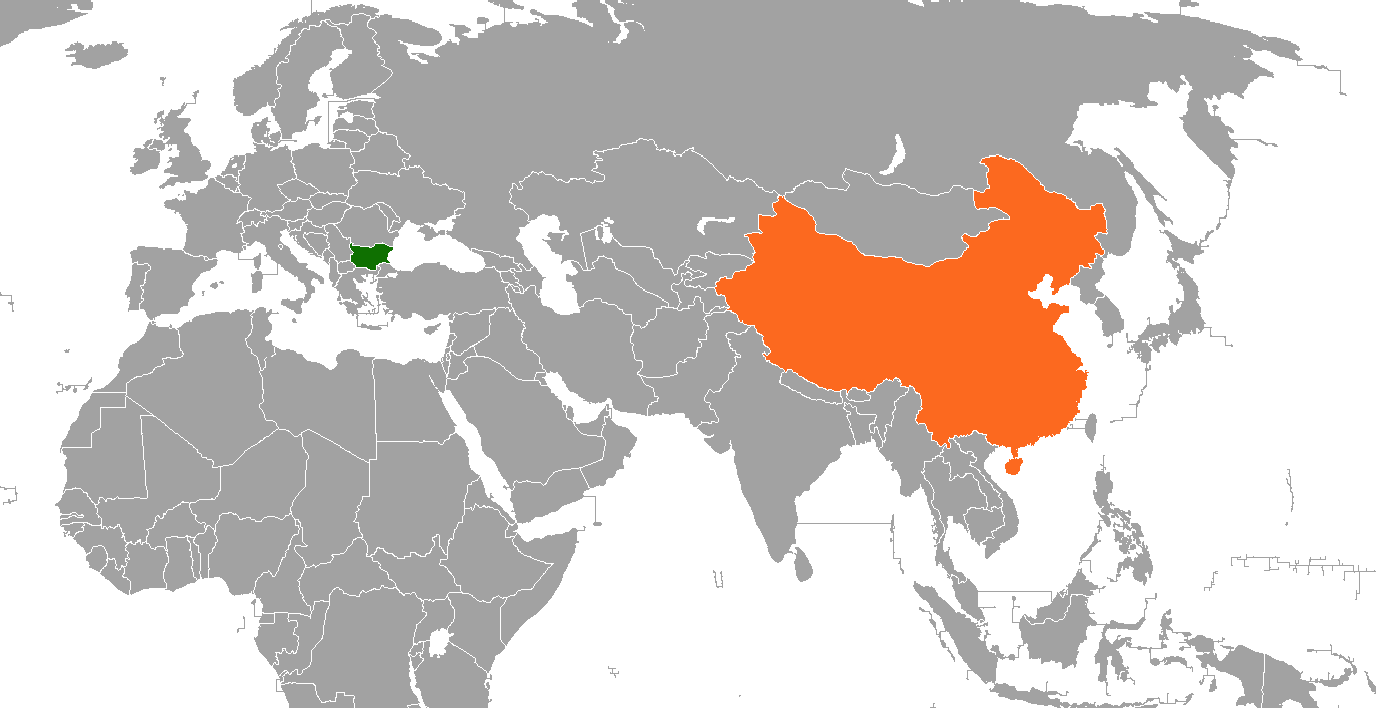

- Bulgaria: China

Bulgaria–China relations are foreign relations between Bulgaria and China. Bulgaria's communist administration recognized the People's Republic of China on October 3, 1949 as the second country to do so with both countries established diplomatic relations the next day.

Bulgaria joined the Belt and Road Initiative in 2015.

In 2019, Bulgaria and China raised their characterization of their mutual foreign relations to a strategic partnership.

== Resident diplomatic missions ==
- Bulgaria has an embassy in Beijing and a consulate-general in Shanghai.
- China has an embassy in Sofia.
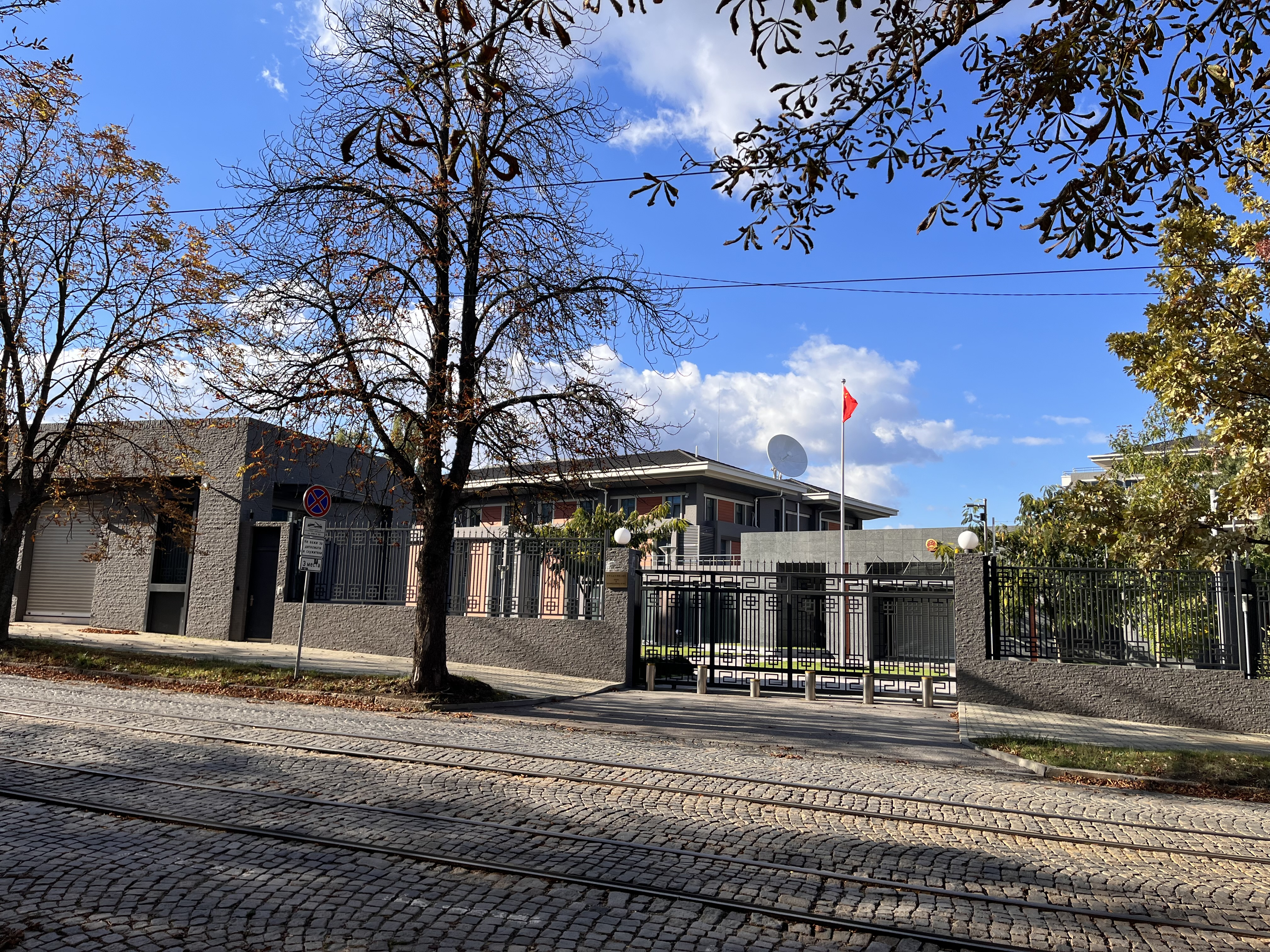
Embassy of China in Sofia

== See also ==
- Foreign relations of Bulgaria
- Foreign relations of China
