= List of diplomatic missions in Bulgaria =

This article lists diplomatic missions resident in Bulgaria. At present, the capital city of Sofia hosts 70 embassies.

This listing excludes honorary consulates.

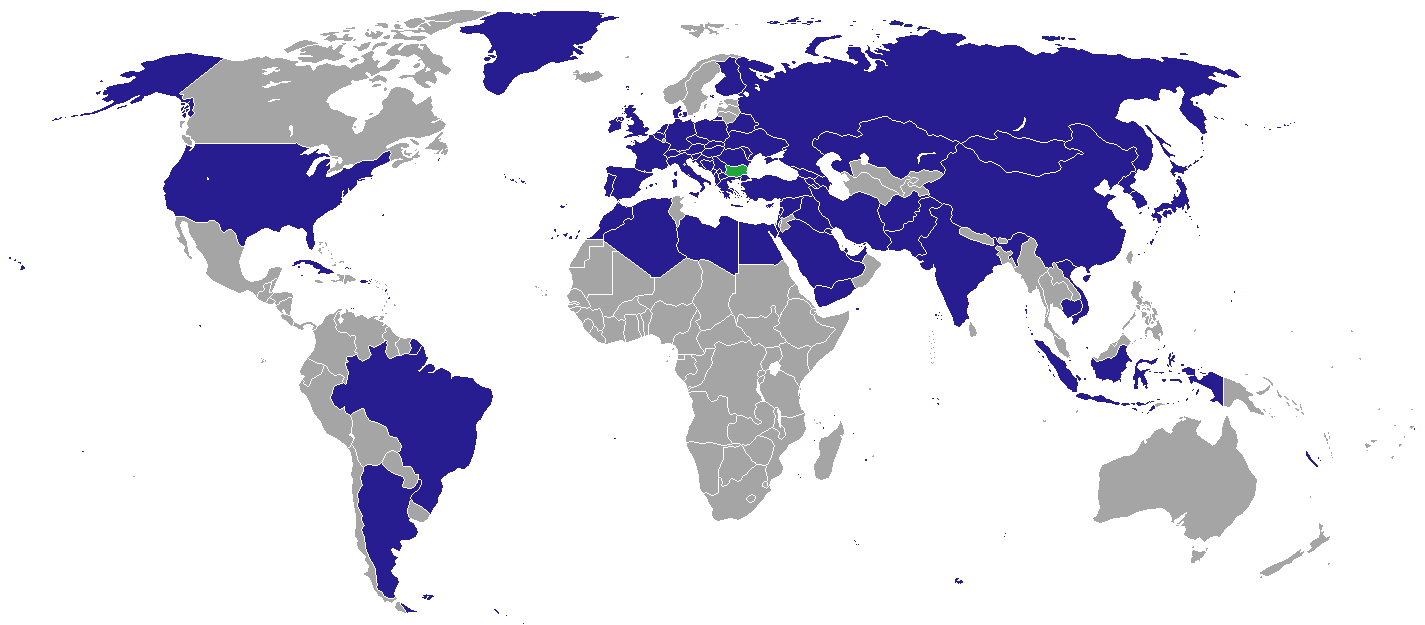
Map of diplomatic missions in Bulgaria

== Diplomatic missions in Sofia ==
Sending Country	Mission	Photo
Afghanistan	Embassy	
Albania	Embassy	
Algeria	Embassy	
Argentina	Embassy	
Armenia	Embassy	
Austria	Embassy	
Azerbaijan	Embassy	
Belarus	Embassy	
Belgium	Embassy	
Bosnia and Herzegovina	Embassy	
Brazil	Embassy	
Cambodia	Embassy	
China	Embassy	
Croatia	Embassy	
Cuba	Embassy	
Cyprus	Embassy	
Czech Republic	Embassy	
Denmark	Embassy	
Egypt	Embassy	
European Union	Delegation	
Finland	Embassy	
France	Embassy	
Georgia	Embassy	
Germany	Embassy	
Greece	Embassy	
Holy See	Apostolic Nunciature	
Hungary	Embassy	
India	Embassy	
Indonesia	Embassy	
Iran	Embassy	
Iraq	Embassy	
Ireland	Embassy	
Israel	Embassy	
Italy	Embassy	
Japan	Embassy	
Kazakhstan	Embassy	
Kosovo	Embassy	
Kuwait	Embassy	
Lebanon	Embassy	
Libya	Embassy	
Moldova	Embassy	
Mongolia	Embassy	
Montenegro	Embassy	
Morocco	Embassy	
Netherlands	Embassy	
Nigeria	Liaison office	
North Korea	Embassy	
North Macedonia	Embassy	
Pakistan	Embassy	
Palestine	Embassy	
Poland	Embassy	
Portugal	Embassy	
Qatar	Embassy	
Romania	Embassy	
Russia	Embassy	
Saudi Arabia	Embassy	
Serbia	Embassy	
Slovakia	Embassy	
Slovenia	Embassy	
South Korea	Embassy	
Sovereign Military Order of Malta	Embassy	
Spain	Embassy	
Switzerland	Embassy	
Syria	Embassy	
Turkey	Embassy	
Ukraine	Embassy	
United Arab Emirates	Embassy	
United Kingdom	Embassy	
United States	Embassy	
Vietnam	Embassy	
Yemen	Embassy	

== Consular missions ==
The cities of Burgas, Plovdiv, and Varna are each host to one career consulate-general.

=== Burgas ===
1. Turkey

=== Plovdiv ===
1. Turkey

=== Varna ===
1. Russia

== Non-resident embassies accredited to Bulgaria ==
=== Resident in Ankara, Turkey ===
1. Chad
2. Dominican Republic
3. Ethiopia
4. Ghana
5. Kenya
6. Uzbekistan

=== Resident in Athens, Greece ===
1. Australia
2. Panama
3. Peru

=== Resident in Belgrade, Serbia ===
1. Angola
2. Guinea
3. Myanmar
4. Tunisia
5. Venezuela

=== Resident in Berlin, Germany ===
1. Bahrain
2. Congo-Brazzaville
3. Jamaica
4. Laos
5. Malawi
6. Mauritania
7. Mauritius
8. Nepal
9. Niger
10. Tanzania
11. Togo
12. Uganda
13. Zimbabwe

=== Resident in Brussels, Belgium ===
1. Central African Republic
2. Grenada
3. New Zealand
4. Papua New Guinea
5. Seychelles
6. South Sudan

=== Resident in Bucharest, Romania ===
1. Bangladesh
2. Canada
3. Chile
4. Colombia
5. Estonia
6. Jordan
7. Lithuania
8. Malaysia
9. Nigeria
10. Norway
11. Philippines
12. Sudan
13. Thailand
14. Uruguay

=== Resident in Moscow, Russia ===
1. Burundi
2. Cameroon
3. Eritrea
4. Guinea-Bissau
5. Mozambique
6. Sierra Leone
7. Singapore
8. Somalia
9. Tajikistan
10. Turkmenistan

=== Resident in Paris, France ===
1. Benin
2. Comoros
3. Liberia
4. Zambia

=== Resident in Rome, Italy ===
1. Burkina Faso
2. Ivory Coast
3. Lesotho
4. Madagascar
5. Mali
6. Nicaragua
7. San Marino
8. Senegal

=== Resident in Vienna, Austria ===
1. El Salvador
2. Namibia
3. Oman
4. Paraguay

=== Resident in Warsaw, Poland ===
1. Iceland
2. Latvia
3. Sri Lanka

=== Resident in other cities ===
1. Andorra (Andorra la Vella)
2. Barbados (Geneva)
3. Congo-Kinshasa (Prague)
4. Ecuador (Budapest)
5. Eswatini (London)
6. Guyana (London)
7. Kyrgyzstan (Kyiv)
8. Luxembourg (Prague)
9. Malta (Valletta)
10. Mexico (Budapest)
11. Rwanda (Tel Aviv)
12. Sweden (Stockholm)

== Closed missions ==
Host city	Sending country	Mission	Year closed	Ref.
Sofia	Colombia	Embassy (Note: Resident in Warsaw, Masovian Voivodeship, Poland)	1999	
Sofia	Estonia	Embassy (Note: Resident in Bucharest, Romania)	2012	
Sofia	Laos	Embassy	1993	
Sofia	Lithuania	Embassy	Unknown	
Sofia	Mexico	Embassy (Note: Resident in Budapest, Hungary)	1989	
Sofia	Nicaragua	Embassy	1994	
Sofia	Norway	Embassy	2016	
Sofia	Peru	Embassy (Note: Resident in Athens, Attica, Greece)	2003	
Sofia	South Africa	Embassy (Note: Resident in Athens, Attica, Greece)	2025	
Sofia	Sudan	Embassy	2018	
Sofia	Sweden	Embassy (Note: Resident in Stockholm, Sweden)	2010	
Sofia	Uruguay	Embassy	2002	
Sofia	Venezuela	Embassy	2020	
Plovdiv	Greece	Consulate-General	2016	
Ruse	Russia	Consulate-General	2022	
Varna	Poland	Consulate General	2008	
Varna	Ukraine	Consulate-General	2014	

== See also ==
- Foreign relations of Bulgaria
- Visa requirements for Bulgarian citizens
- List of diplomatic missions of Bulgaria
