= Bulgaria–Netherlands relations =

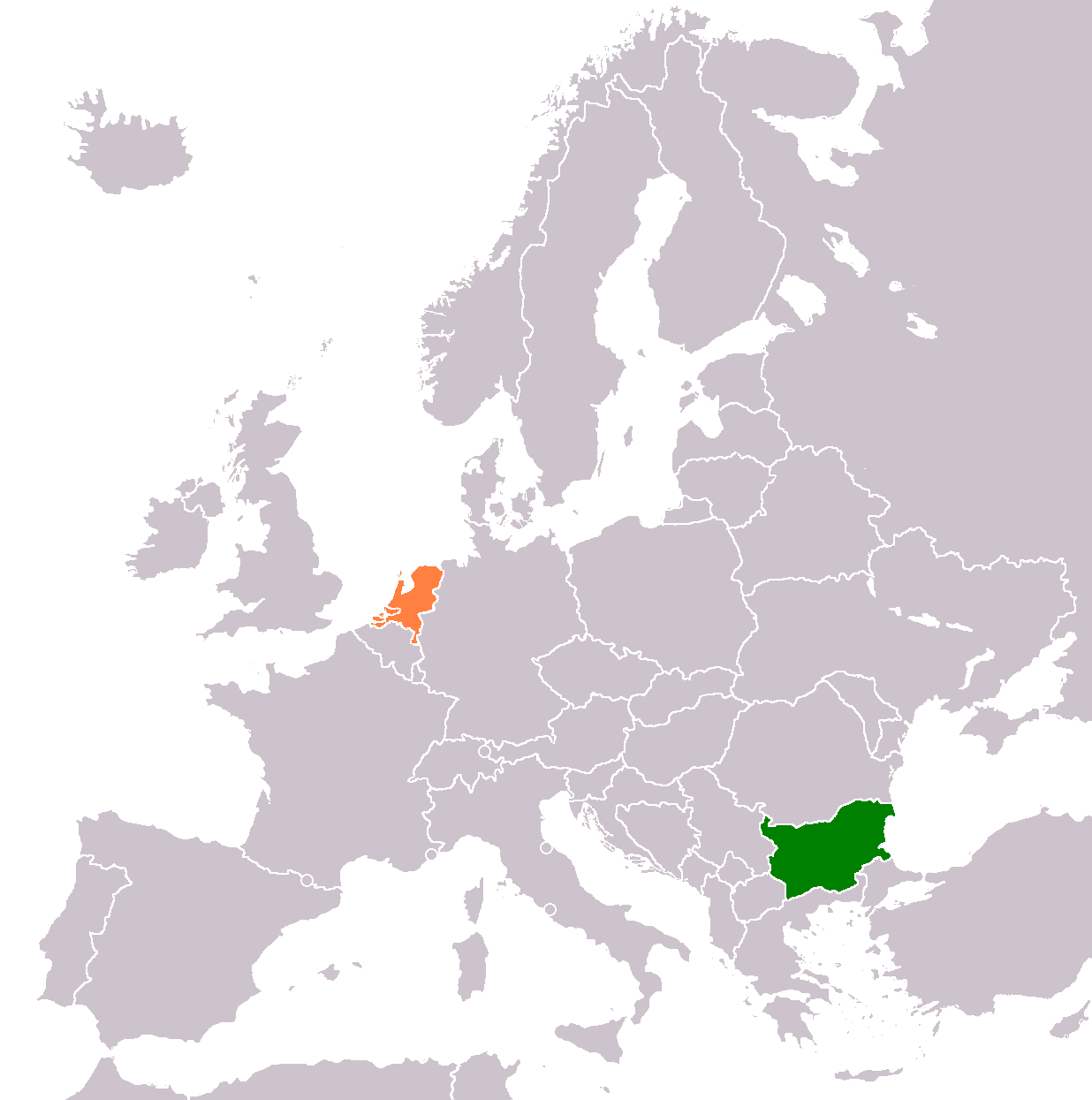

- Bulgaria: Netherlands

Diplomatic mission
- Embassy of Bulgaria, The Hague: Embassy of the Netherlands, Sofia

Bulgaria–Netherlands relations are foreign relations between Bulgaria and the Netherlands. Bulgaria has an embassy in The Hague. The Netherlands has an embassy in Sofia. Both countries are members of the European Union and the NATO. the Netherlands has given full support to Bulgaria's membership in the European Union and NATO.

== Royal Visits to Bulgaria ==
- Beatrix of the Netherlands and Prince Claus of the Netherlands
  - 6–8 October 1999 - Sofia, Burgas and Nesebar
- The Prince of Orange
  - 25–26 May 2009 - Sofia

== the European Union and NATO ==
While the Netherlands was one of the founding members of the EU, Bulgaria joined the EU in 2007. While the Netherlands was one of the founding members of NATO, Bulgaria joined NATO in 2004.

== Resident diplomatic missions ==
- Bulgaria has an embassy in The Hague.
- the Netherlands has an embassy in Sofia.
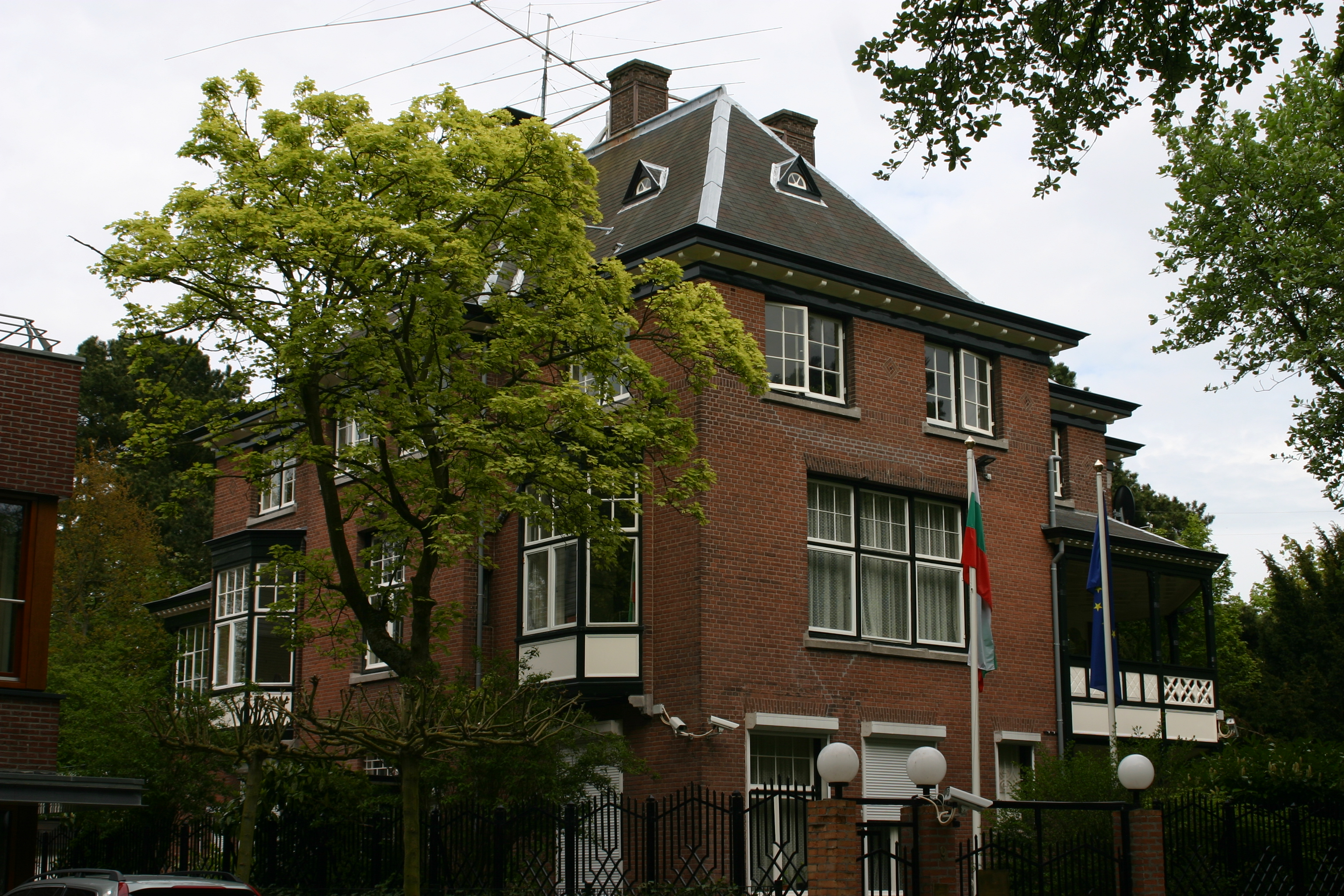
Embassy of Bulgaria in The Hague

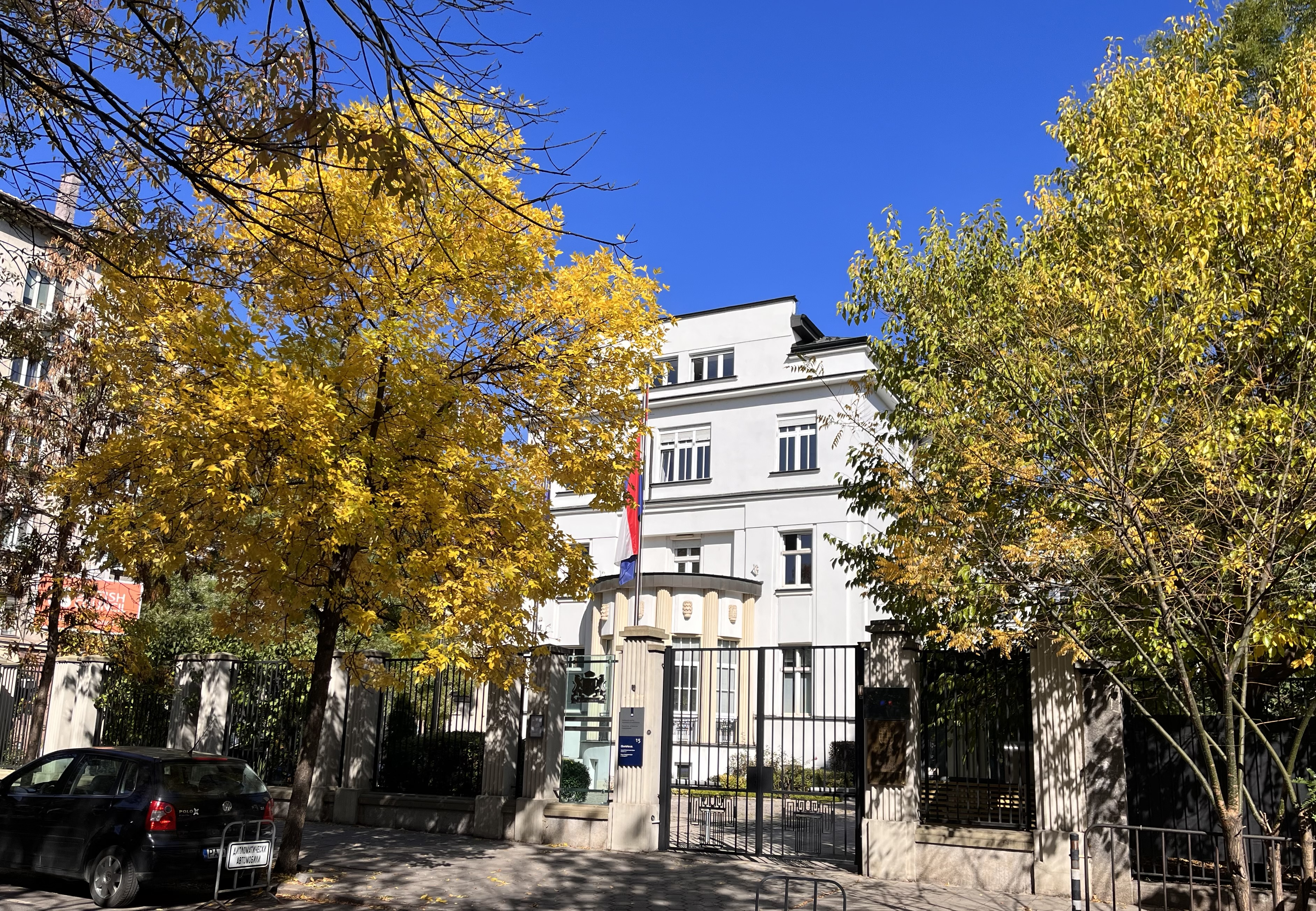
Embassy of the Netherlands in Sofia

== See also ==
- Foreign relations of Bulgaria
- Foreign relations of the Netherlands
- Bulgarians in the Netherlands
