= Bulgaria–Spain relations =

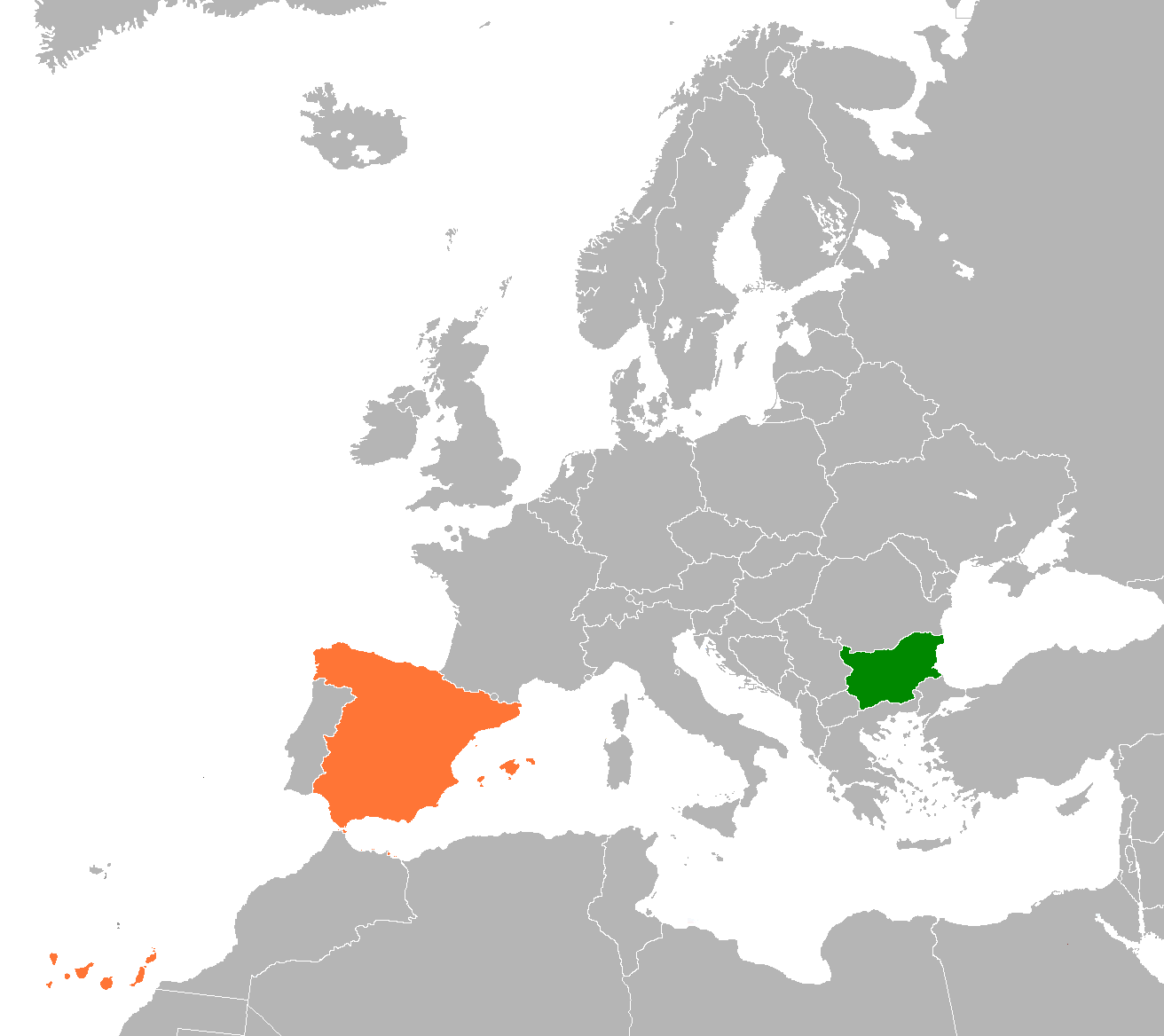

- Bulgaria: Spain

Bulgaria–Spain relations are foreign relations between the Republic of Bulgaria and the Kingdom of Spain. Both countries established diplomatic relation on 8 May 1910. Relations were severed in 1946 and were restored in 1970 at the level of Consular Office and Trade Mission. Since 27 January 1970, the diplomatic relations were elevated to embassy level. Bulgaria has an embassy in Madrid and an honorary consulate in Barcelona. Spain has an embassy in Sofia. Both countries are full members of the Council of Europe, the European Union, NATO and the United Nations. Spain has given full support to Bulgaria's membership in the European Union and NATO.

== Bilateral relations ==
Spain is a relevant trading partner for Bulgaria and a prominent investor. In addition, Spain is one of the preferred destinations for Bulgarian emigration and the main issuer of remittances received by the Balkan country from abroad. In the political sphere, Spain has always supported Bulgaria's integration into community institutions and other international organizations. Cooperation in this regard has been oriented towards institutional strengthening and the formation of human capital. Despite having a privileged location, in an area of strategic value where access roads between the Balkans, Eastern Europe and Turkey converge, Bulgaria cannot yet take advantage of the full commercial potential of its geographical location due to the lack of transport infrastructure (especially land), which prevent direct exports from countries like Spain.

== Royal visits to Bulgaria ==
- King Juan Carlos and Queen Sofia of Spain
  - 23–25 May 1993 – Sofia
  - 8–10 June 2003 – Sofia and Plovdiv
- The Prince of Asturias and The Princess of Asturias
  - 9–10 February 2006 – Sofia
- (expected) July 2013 - Delegation from Vigo (Galicia, Spain) headed by A.Yllera - Sofia, Plovdiv and Pleven.

== NATO and the European Union ==
Spain joined NATO and the EU in 1982, and 1986, respectively. Spain supported Bulgaria's aspiration to join NATO, and ratified Bulgaria's accession in 2003. Spain supported Bulgaria's aspiration to join the EU, and ratified Bulgaria's accession in 2005. Bulgaria joined NATO in 2004 and the EU in 2007.

== Resident diplomatic missions ==
- Bulgaria has an embassy in Madrid and consulates-general in Barcelona and Valencia.
- Spain has an embassy in Sofia.
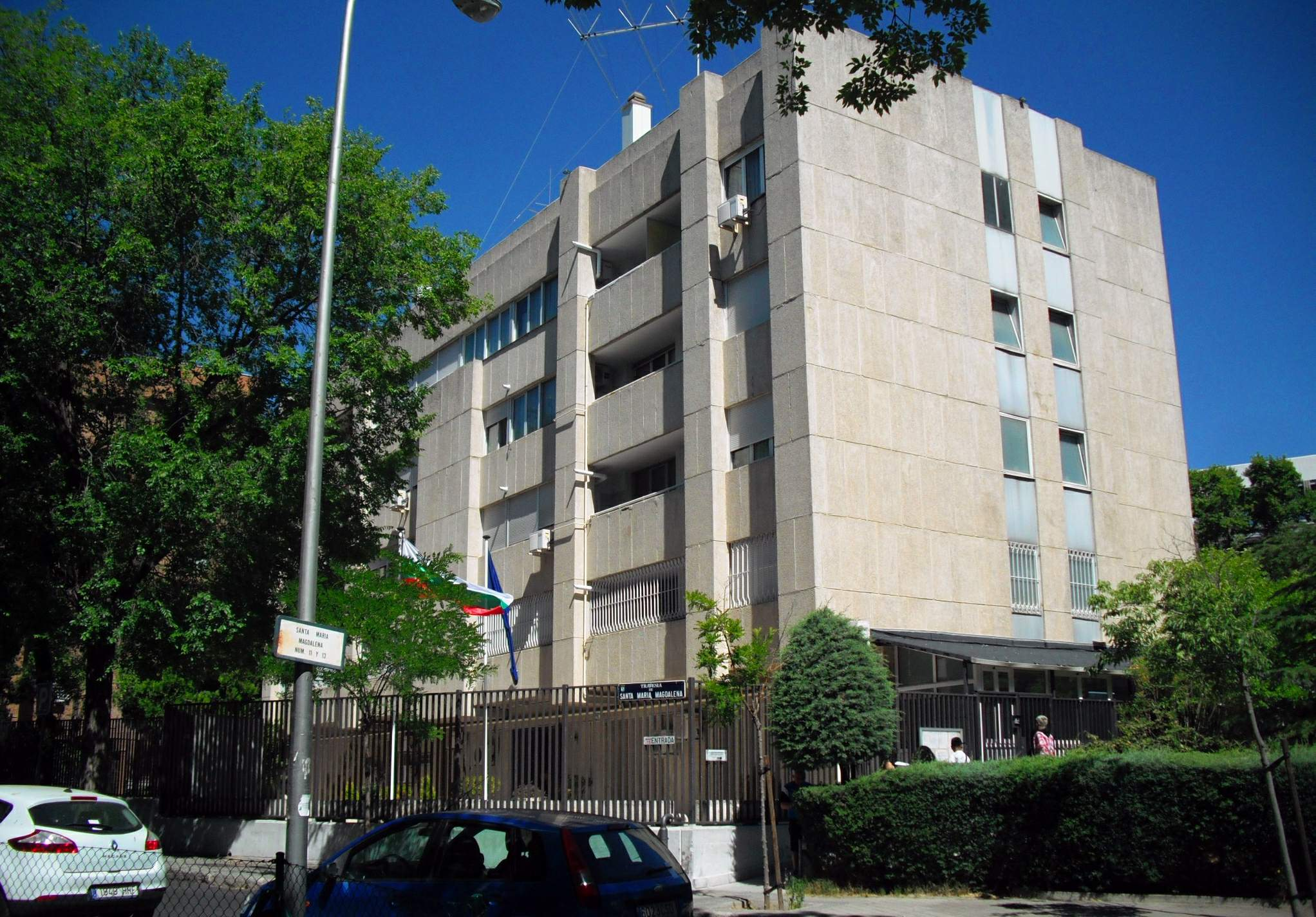
Embassy of Bulgaria in Madrid

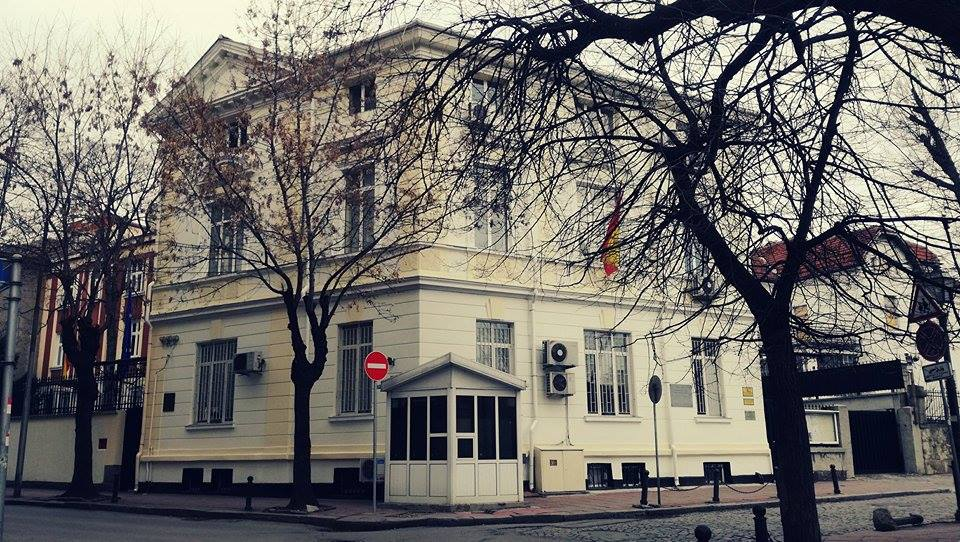
Embassy of Spain in Sofia

== See also ==
- Foreign relations of Bulgaria
- Foreign relations of Spain
- Bulgarians in Spain
