= Bulgaria–Indonesia relations =

- Bulgaria: Indonesia

Bulgaria and Indonesia established diplomatic relations in 1956. Bulgaria has an embassy in Jakarta while Indonesia has an embassy in Sofia.

== History ==
Bulgaria and Indonesia officially established diplomatic relations on 20 September 1956. Bulgaria has had an embassy in Jakarta since October 1958 and Indonesia has had an embassy in Sofia since 1960.

== Agreements ==
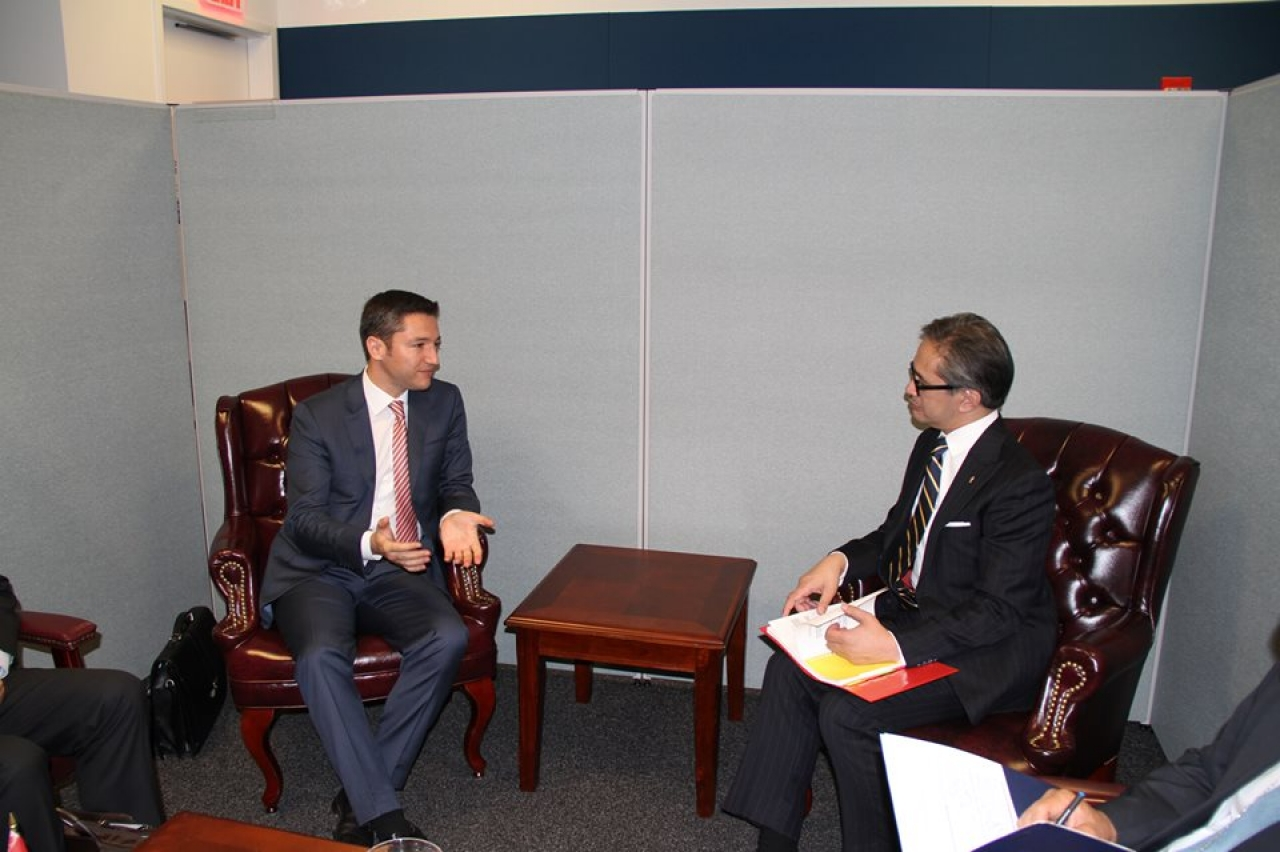
Kristian Vigenin and Marty Natalegawa

In June 2003, the two countries signed a memorandum of understanding on trade.

In September 2003, Bulgaria and Indonesia's respective presidents pledged agreement on combating international terrorism.

In 2004, the Bulgarian news agency, BTA, set up a cooperative relationship with Indonesia's ANTARA. In 2005, Bulgaria sent USD 82,000 worth of medicine to Indonesia after the tsunami of December 26, 2004. Also in 2004, Bulgarian Foreign Minister Solomon Passy talked to Noer Hasan Wirajuda, Indonesia's Foreign Minister, and they agreed that Bulgaria and Indonesia should boost their bilateral cooperation.

== Humanitarian aid ==
Following the 2006 Yogyakarta earthquake in Indonesia, Bulgaria sent humanitarian aid of 160,000 leva for the victims of the earthquake. Disaster Management Minister Emel Etem said that the country would donate medicine, 50 tents and mattresses, 1,500 blankets.

== See also ==
- Foreign relations of Bulgaria
- Foreign relations of Indonesia
- List of diplomatic missions of Bulgaria
- List of diplomatic missions of Indonesia
