= Austria–Bulgaria relations =

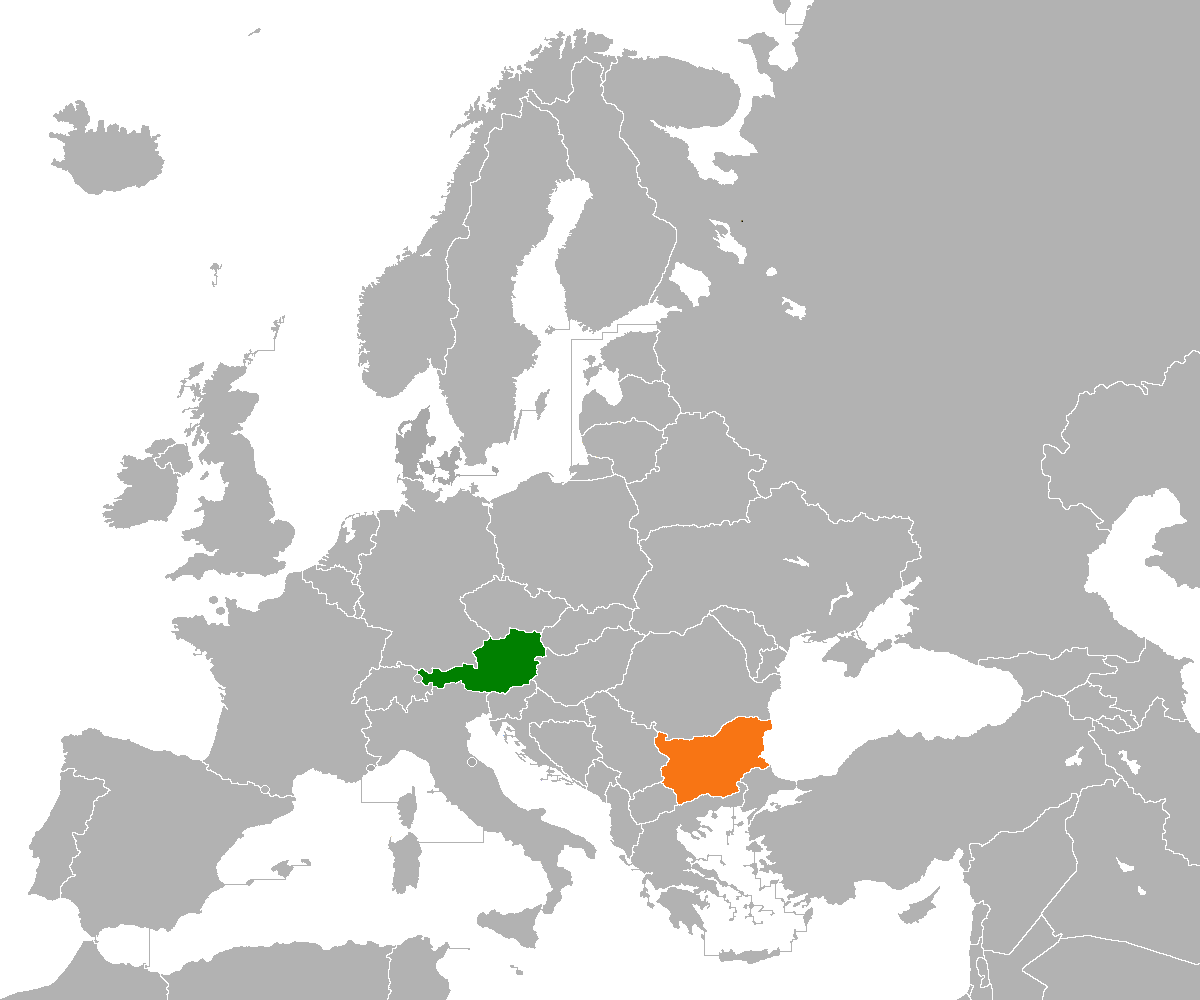

- Austria: Bulgaria

Diplomatic relations between Austria (then a part of Austria-Hungary) and Bulgaria were established in 1879. Austria has an embassy in Sofia and an honorary consulate in Burgas while Bulgaria has an embassy in Vienna and an honorary consulate in Salzburg.

Both countries are members of the European Union, Organization for Security and Co-operation in Europe and the Council of Europe. Bulgaria is a full member of NATO, while Austria is not.

== History ==
In 1885, Tsardom of Bulgaria and Austria-Hungary were not formal enemies but rather maintaining the status quo. Austria-Hungary acted as a restraining power in the conflict between Bulgaria and Serbia. While it opposed the Bulgarian unification on geopolitical grounds and worked alliance with Serbia.

By 1894, trade relations between Austria-Hungary and Bulgaria were formalized under mutual most-favored-nation agreements, which were periodically renewed but insufficient to substantially expand trade. Austro-Hungarian economic policy therefore maintained a cautiously cooperative stance toward Bulgaria.

The Banat Bulgarian community, largely Western-rite Catholics descended from 17th–18th-century refugees from Bulgaria, had been settled in Austria-Hungary for over a century by 1890. Their population in Temes and Torontál counties numbered 14,801 in 1890 and 12,583 in 1910.

During World War I, Austria-Hungary and Bulgaria were part of a wartime military coalition known as the Central Powers, including joint military campaigns such as the invasion of Serbia.

During World War II, Bulgarian prisoners of war were among Allied POWs held in the Stalag XVII-A German POW camp in German-annexed Austria.

The Austria-Bulgaria relationship during the Cold War illustrates how neutral states and aligned socialist countries could pursue targeted cooperation amid geopolitical tension. Austria served as a testbed and intermediary for Bulgarian engagement with the West, while both countries jointly navigated regional challenges in Yugoslavia.

In April 2005, President of Bulgaria Georgi Parvanov paid a state visit to Austria.

== European Union ==
Austria joined the EU in 1995. Bulgaria joined the EU in 2007.

In December 2022, Austria prevented Bulgaria's and Romania's accession to the Schengen Area. In the two countries, the Austrian veto caused considerable outrage. As of 9 December 2024, Austria had lifted its veto, allowing Romania and Bulgaria to become part of the Schengen free-travel zone on 1 January 2025.

== NATO ==
While Bulgaria became a member of NATO in 2004, Austria has never been a member of NATO.

== Resident diplomatic missions ==
- Austria has an embassy in Sofia.
- Bulgaria has an embassy in Vienna.
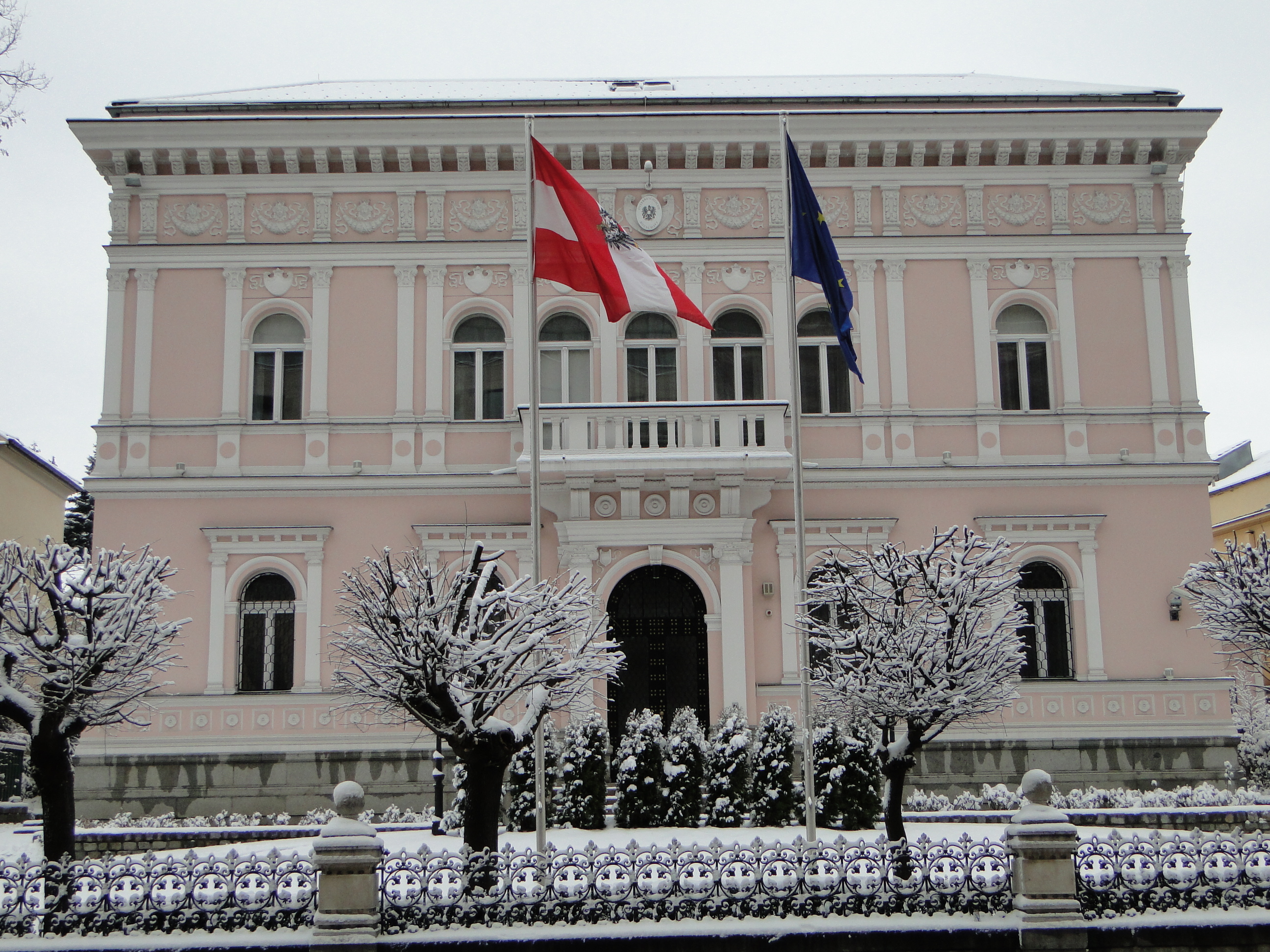
Embassy of Austria in Sofia

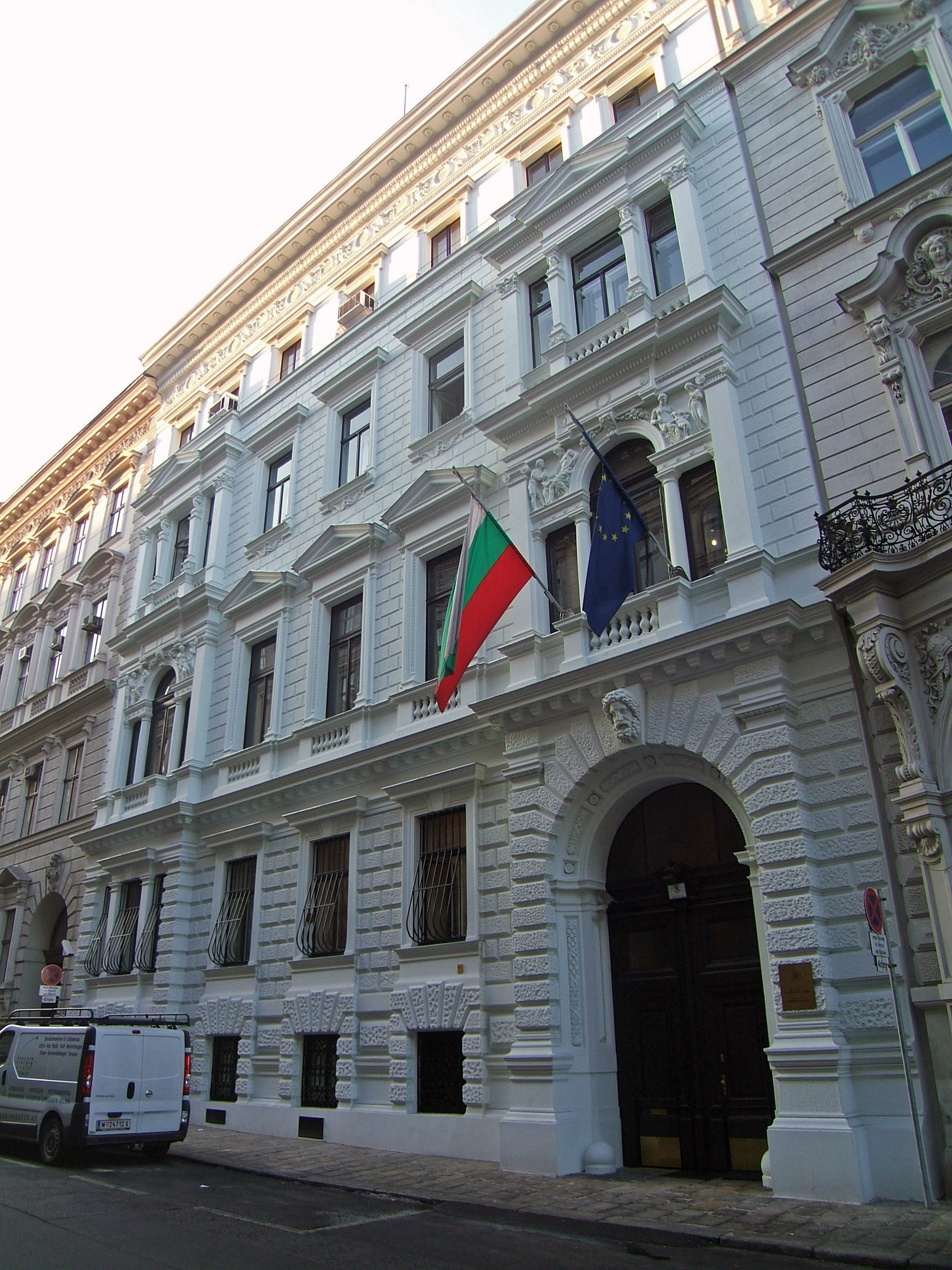
Embassy of Bulgaria in Vienna

== See also ==
- Foreign relations of Austria
- Foreign relations of Bulgaria
- Bulgarians in Austria
