= Bulgaria–Denmark relations =

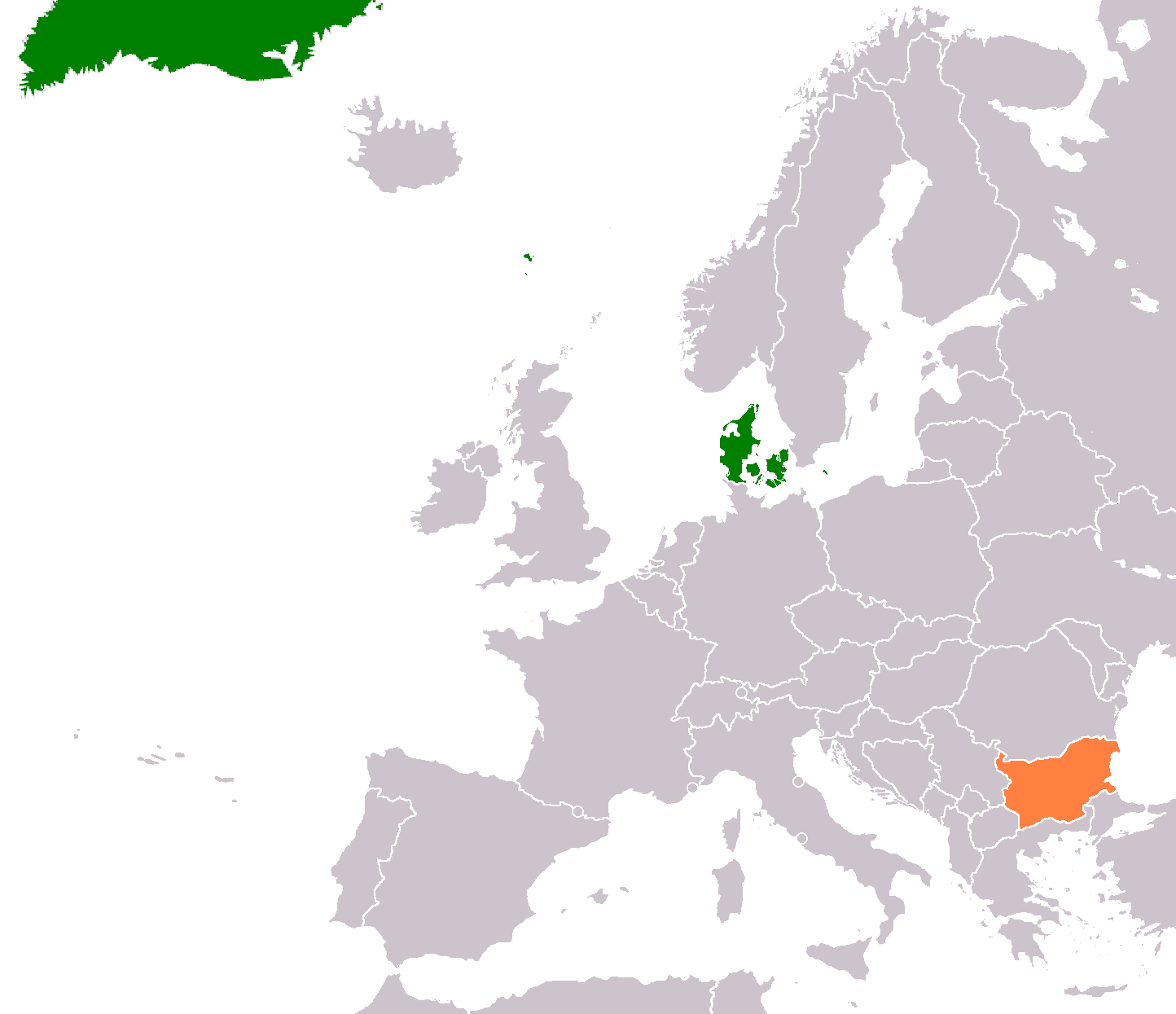

- Denmark: Bulgaria

Bulgaria–Denmark relations are foreign relations between Bulgaria and Denmark. Bulgaria has an embassy in Copenhagen. Denmark has an embassy in Sofia. Both countries are full members of the Council of Europe, the European Union and NATO. Denmark has given full support to Bulgaria's membership in the European Union and NATO.

== Royal Visits to Bulgaria ==
- Margrethe II of Denmark and Henrik, Prince Consort of Denmark
  - 17–19 October 2000 - Sofia, Plovdiv and Rila Monastery
- Frederik, Crown Prince of Denmark and Mary, Crown Princess of Denmark
  - 15–17 September 2008 - Sofia and Plovdiv

== Resident diplomatic missions ==
- Bulgaria has an embassy in Copenhagen.
- Denmark has an embassy in Sofia.

== See also ==
- Foreign relations of Bulgaria
- Foreign relations of Denmark
