= Bulgarians in Spain =

Bulgarians (Spanish: búlgaros) in Spain (Bulgarian: Испания, Ispania) are one of the largest communities of the Bulgarian diaspora. According to official 2019 data, they numbered 197,373, making them the tenth-largest emigrant community in Spain and the second-largest among Central and Eastern European emigrant communities.

== History ==
The bulk of Bulgarians in Spain consists of recent economic immigrants. Until recent years, Bulgarian emigration to Spain was scarce and unorganized. According to historian Ivan Dimitrov, an unknown number of Bulgarians fled to Spain after the Ottoman conquest of the Second Bulgarian Empire in the late 14th or early 15th century. Dimitrov claims that around 300 families in Spain retain memories of their Bulgarian origin from that period. Among Bulgarians are Banat Bulgarians from Romania, Aromanians and Megleno-Romanians who became adjusted to Spanish society because of the linguistic similarities between Romanian, Aromanian, Megleno-Romanian, and Spanish, as well as Latin identity of Aromanians and Megleno-Romanians, and Banat Bulgarians are predominantly Roman Catholic.

With the upsurge of Bulgarian economy in the 18th and 19th centuries, individual Bulgarian merchants reached the markets of Spain, though a colony was never formed even after the Liberation of Bulgaria in 1878. Only after World War I did Bulgarian gardeners reach Spain, specifically Catalonia. According to a 1930 statistic, 88 Bulgarian gardeners worked in Spain. However, the Spanish Civil War of 1936–39 and World War II that followed hindered the formation of a gardening colony.

After World War II, a small number of Bulgarian political emigrants fleeing the communist regime settled in Spain. Among those emigrants was a large part of the Bulgarian royal family, including the deposed child monarch Tsar Simeon II of Saxe-Coburg-Gotha, who was granted asylum by Francisco Franco in 1951. Simeon II lived in Spain for 50 years, until his return to Bulgaria in 2001.

Around 1998, the number of Bulgarians in Spain was only around 3,000. By 2002, around 10,000 people had been officially registered as legal Bulgarian emigrants, though the number of illegal immigrants was thought to be much larger. In the early 21st century, substantial Bulgarian communities were formed in Madrid, Barcelona, Málaga, San Sebastián, Valladolid, Palma de Mallorca and other cities.

== Foreign population of Bulgarian citizenship in Spain ==
Bulgarian citizens living in Spain include ethnic Bulgarians as well as minority groups (including Turks, Pomaks, Armenians etc.).

Vertical bar chart of foreign population of Bulgarian nationality in Spain between 2002 and 2022
Population (2002–2022). Foreign population in Spain of Bulgarian nationality according to the Instituto Nacional de Estadística.

Year of census	Bulgarian residents
1998	1,453
1999	1,831 ▲
2000	3,031 ▲
2001	12,035 ▲
2002	29,741 ▲
2003	52,838 ▲
2004	69,854 ▲
2005	93,037 ▲
2006	101,617 ▲
2007	122,057 ▲
2008	153,973 ▲
2009	164,717 ▲
2010	169,552 ▲
2011	172,926 ▲
2012	176,411 ▲
2013	168,997 ▼
2014	151,579 ▼
2015	142,328 ▼
2016	133,951 ▼
2017	127,669 ▼
2018	124,404 ▼
2019	122,813 ▼
2020	122,375 ▼
2021	118,120 ▼
2022	113,554 ▼

== Notable people ==
- Mariana Gurkova
- Romano Kristoff

== See also ==
- Bulgaria–Spain relations
- Bulgarian diaspora
- Immigration to Spain
