= Bulgaria–Mexico relations =

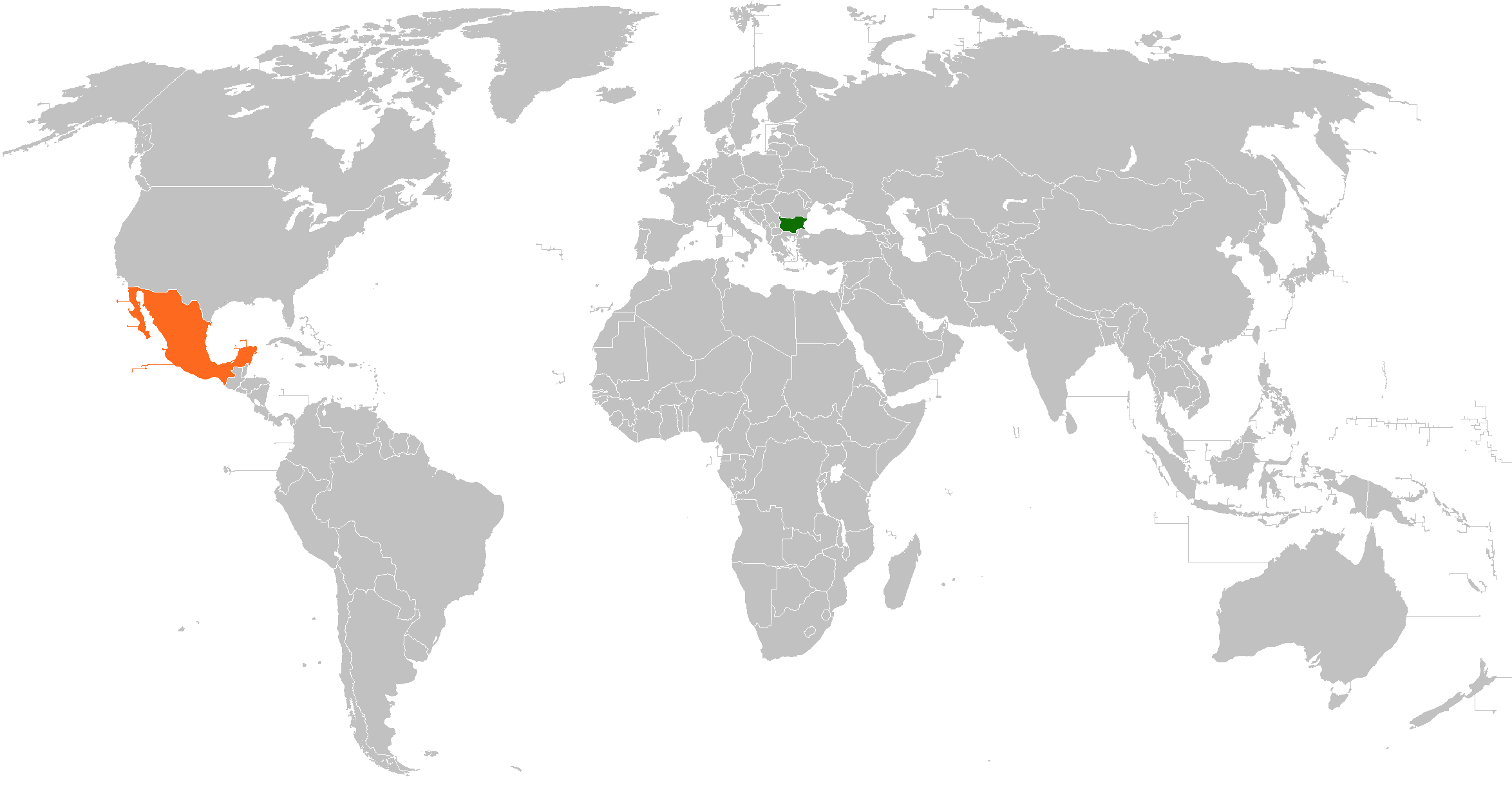

- Bulgaria: Mexico

The nations of Bulgaria and Mexico established diplomatic relations in 1938. Both nations are mutual members of the United Nations and the World Trade Organization.

== History ==
Although Mexico was not a major destination for Bulgarian migrants; several hundred migrants from Bulgaria immigrated to Mexico in order to travel to the United States in the mid-1960s after the United States passed the Immigration and Nationality Act of 1965 which abolished the quota system based on national origins.

In 1936, Bulgaria and Mexico signed a Treaty of Friendship. Diplomatic relations between both nations were established on 6 January 1938. In 1941, during World War II, both nations suspended diplomatic relations when Bulgaria joined the Tripartite Pact (a military alliance between the Axis powers and Bulgaria, among others). In May 1942, Mexico declared war on the Axis powers. Diplomatic relations between both nations were resumed on 11 July 1974. In 1976, both nations opened resident embassies in each other's capitals.

In June 1978, Mexican President José López Portillo paid an official visit to Bulgaria and was accompanied by Foreign Secretary Santiago Roel García. While in Bulgaria, President López Portillo visited the cities of Sofia, Plovdiv and Varna. In 1979, Bulgarian President Todor Zhivkov reciprocated the visit to Mexico.

In 1989 Mexico closed its embassy in Sofia due to financial restraints. Since then, relations between both nations have been conducted mainly at United Nations summits. In November 2008, Bulgarian President Georgi Parvanov paid an official visit to Mexico and met with Mexican President Felipe Calderón.

In 2023, both nations celebrated 85 years of diplomatic relations. In celebration, the Mexican Secretariat of Foreign Affairs opened a temporary exhibition on its premise celebrating the history of diplomatic relations between both nations.

In January 2024, Bulgarian Deputy Foreign Minister, Tihomir Stoytchev, visited Mexico to attend the 5th Meeting of the Mexico-Bulgaria Political Consultation Mechanism, held in Mexico City. In June of that same year, Claudia Sheinbaum was elected as President of Mexico. Her maternal grandparents immigrated to Mexico from Bulgaria in the 1930s.

In November 2025, the Casa de México en Bulgaria Foundation was established in Sofia, the first independent Mexican cultural institution in Eastern Europe and the Balkans.

== High-level visits ==
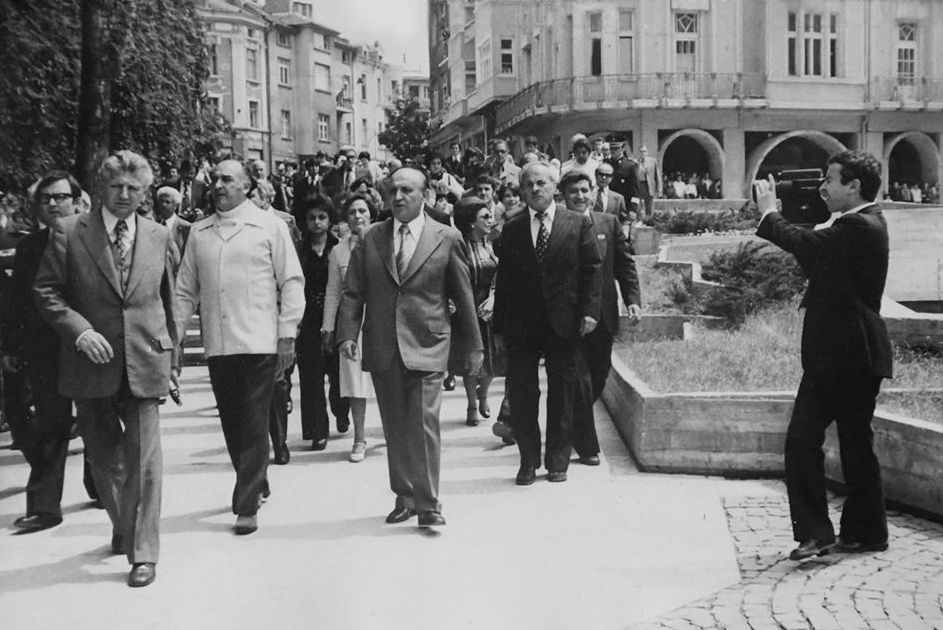
Bulgarian President Todor Zhivkov and Mexican President José López Portillo on a visit to Plovdiv, Bulgaria; 1978.

High-level visits from Bulgaria to Mexico

- President Todor Zhivkov (1979)
- President Georgi Parvanov (2008)
- Deputy Foreign Minister Tihomir Stoytchev (2024)

High-level visits from Mexico to Bulgaria

- President José López Portillo (1978)
- Foreign Secretary Santiago Roel García (1978)

== Bilateral agreements ==
Both nations have signed a few bilateral agreements such as an Agreement on Economic Cooperation (1978); Agreement on Touristic Cooperation (1979); Agreement of a Convention on Consular Relations (1984); Agreement on Scientific and Technical Cooperation (1994) and an Agreement on Cultural and Educational Cooperation (1994). Both nations have also agreed to establish periodical Bilateral Political Consultation Meetings for which they have met in 2002, 2006, 2007, 2012 and 2024.

== Trade ==
In 1997, Mexico signed a Free Trade Agreement with the European Union (which includes Bulgaria). In 2023, trade between Bulgaria and Mexico totaled US$263 million. Bulgaria's main exports to Mexico include: mineral and chemical deposits, fruit seeds, unexposed film and textiles. Mexico's main exports to Bulgaria include: computers, mobile phones and other electronics. Mexican multinational company América Móvil operates in Bulgaria.

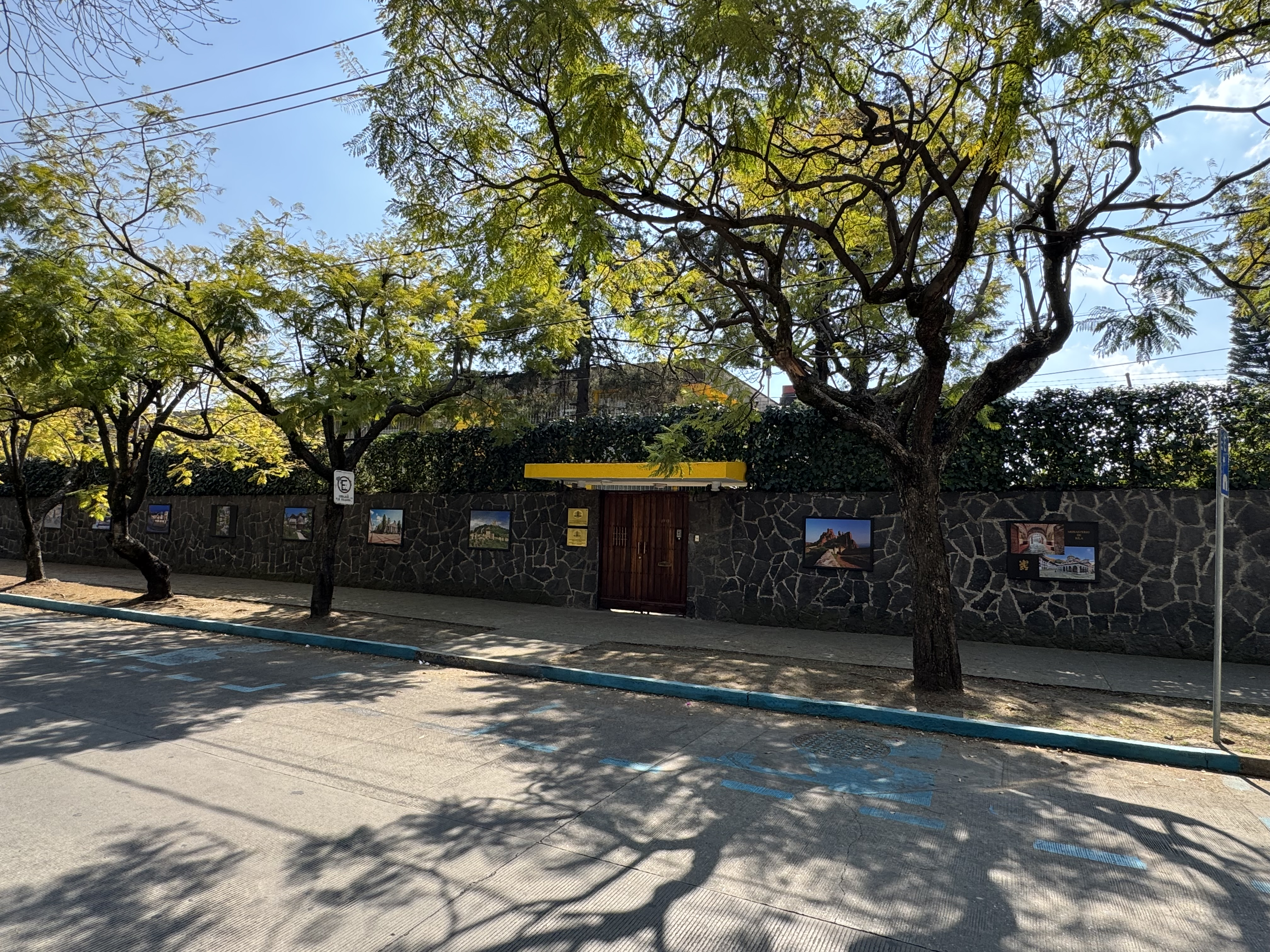
Embassy of Bulgaria in Mexico City

== Resident diplomatic missions ==
- Bulgaria has an embassy in Mexico City.
- Mexico is accredited to Bulgaria from its embassy in Budapest, Hungary and maintains an honorary consulate in Sofia.

== See also ==
- Foreign relations of Bulgaria
- Foreign relations of Mexico
