= Bulgaria–South Korea relations =

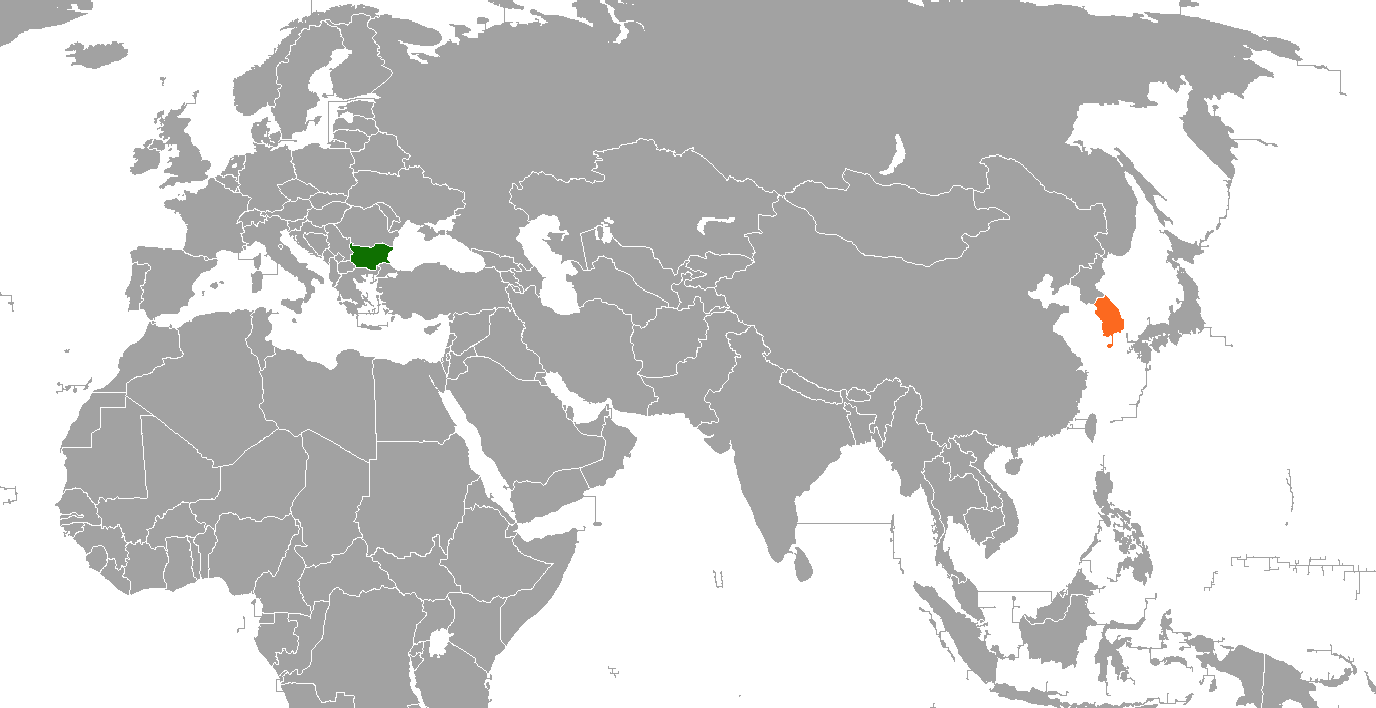

- Bulgaria: South Korea

Bulgaria–South Korea relations are foreign relations between the Bulgaria and South Korea. Both countries re-established diplomatic relations on March 23, 1990. During the Cold War, Bulgaria had diplomatic relations only with North Korea. Bulgaria has an embassy in Seoul. South Korea has an embassy in Sofia.

== Resident diplomatic missions ==
- Bulgaria has an embassy in Seoul.
- South Korea has an embassy in Sofia.

== See also ==
- Foreign relations of Bulgaria
- Foreign relations of South Korea
