= Foreign relations of Bulgaria =

The foreign relations of Bulgaria are overseen by the Ministry of Foreign Relations headed by the Minister of Foreign Affairs. Situated in Southeast Europe, Bulgaria is a member of both NATO (since 2004) and the European Union (since 2007). It maintains diplomatic relations with 187 countries.

Bulgaria has generally good foreign relations with its neighbours and has proved to be a constructive force in the region under socialist and democratic governments alike. Promoting regional stability, Bulgaria hosted a Southeast European Foreign Ministers meeting in July 1996, and an OSCE conference on Black Sea cooperation in November 1995. Bulgaria also participated in the 1996 South Balkan Defense Ministerial in Albania and it is active in the Southeast European Cooperative Initiative. Since the group's inception in 2015 Bulgaria has been a part of the Bucharest Nine, a subset of Eastern European NATO countries. The Republic of North Macedonia plays an important role in Bulgarian foreign and domestic policy due to historical, ethnic and cultural ties.

== History ==
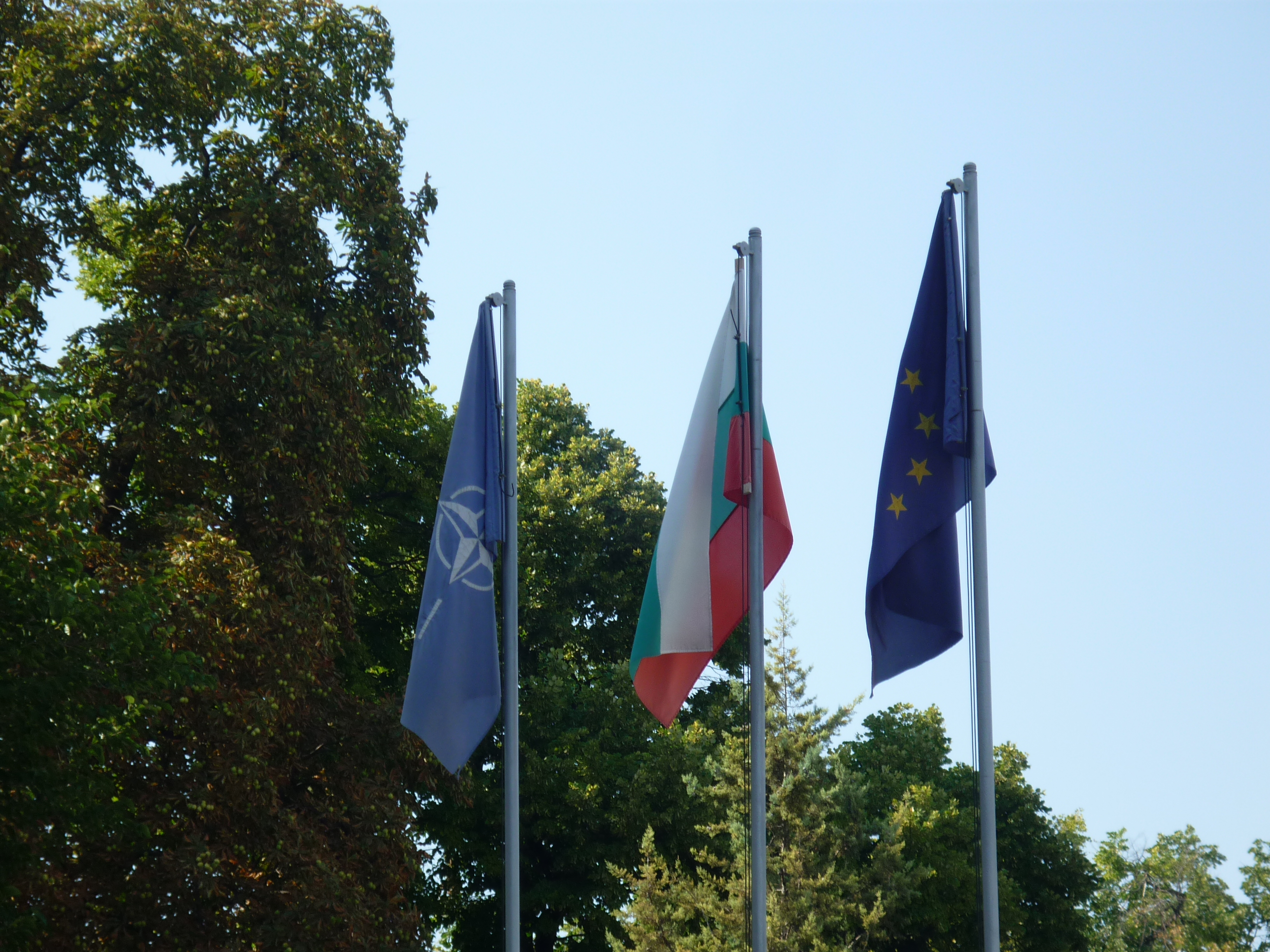
Flags of NATO, Bulgaria, European Union at the Military club of Plovdiv, Bulgaria.

After the fall of communism in Eastern Europe in 1989, Bulgaria sought economic cooperative arrangements with Germany, Italy, France, Portugal, and Spain, as well as military cooperation with Romania, Greece, and Turkey. A start was made on easing tensions with its historical adversary Serbia.

Due to close historical, cultural, and economic ties, Bulgaria sought a mutually beneficial relationship with Russia, on which it largely depends for energy supplies.

Bulgaria's EU Association Agreement came into effect in 1994, and Bulgaria formally applied for full EU membership in December 1995. During the 1999 EU summit in Helsinki, the country was invited to start membership talks with the Union. On January 1, 2007, Bulgaria officially became a member of the European Union. In 1996, Bulgaria acceded to the Wassenaar Arrangement controlling exports of weapons and sensitive technology to countries of concern and also was admitted to the World Trade Organization. Bulgaria is a member of the Zangger Committee and the Nuclear Suppliers Group. After a period of equivocation under a socialist government, in March 1997 a UDF-led caretaker cabinet applied for full NATO membership, which became a reality in April 2004.

Bulgaria and the United States signed a Defense Cooperation Agreement in 2006 providing for military bases and training camps of the U.S. Army in Bulgaria, as part of the Pentagon's restructuring plan.

The HIV trial in Libya resulted in the release of Bulgarian nurses imprisoned by Muammar Gaddafi's government in Libya. French President Nicolas Sarkozy secured the release in exchange for several business deals.

In June 2010, media reports claimed that Bulgaria was considering closing a total of 30 of its diplomatic missions abroad. Currently, Bulgaria has 83 embassies, 6 permanent representations, 20 consular offices, and 2 diplomatic bureaus. The proposed closures were backed by Prime Minister Boyko Borisov, who described some of Bulgaria's embassies as useless. In November 2010, Bulgaria's Foreign Minister Nikolay Mladenov formally announced that his team proposed to close seven embassies as part of a restructuring and austerity plan.

In March 2012 the Borisov administration decided to discontinue its plans to build with the help of Rosatom and Atomstroyexport the Belene nuclear station near the River Danube. At the time, Bulgaria depended on Russia for 89% of its petrol, 100% of natural gas and all of the nuclear fuel needed for its twin-reactor Kozloduy nuclear station. In the subsequent lawsuit, the International Court of Arbitration at the International Chamber of Commerce in Geneva ruled against Bulgaria.

=== 2014-2021 ===
In August 2014 Bulgaria suspended its 930 km portion of the South Stream natural gas pipeline project with Gazprom until the project conforms to European Union law. In default of this project, Naftogaz and Ukraine stood to benefit. Gas was to be pumped to the Black Sea port of Varna before it travelled overland to the Serbian border and northeast from there to Hungary, Slovenia and Austria.

A Bulgarian weapons dealer named Emilian Gebrev was poisoned (along with his son and an employee) in Sofia in spring 2015 using a substance believed to be the nerve agent Novichok, and in 2020 three Russian nationals were charged in absentia. One of the three went by the name Sergei Fedotov, which is the alias of Denis Sergeev (GRU officer).

The Bucharest Nine (or B9 format) is an organization founded on 4 November 2015 in Bucharest, Romania, at the initiative of the President of Romania Klaus Iohannis and the President of Poland Andrzej Duda during a bilateral meeting between them. Its members are Bulgaria, the Czech Republic, Estonia, Hungary, Latvia, Lithuania, Poland, Romania and Slovakia. Its apparition was mainly a result of a perceived aggressive attitude from Russia following the annexation of Crimea from Ukraine and its posterior intervention in eastern Ukraine both in 2014. All members of the B9 were either part of the former Soviet Union (USSR) or the Soviet-led Warsaw Pact.

Rampant corruption has led as recently as June 2019 to repeated rejection of Bulgaria's attempts to join the Schengen Area.

In November 2020, Bulgaria vetoed the European Union's draft negotiating framework for North Macedonia's accession talks, thereby blocking the start of negotiation talks. Bulgarian officials cited longstanding disputes over history and language, and called on North Macedonia to acknowledge what they described as the Bulgarian roots of the Macedonian language and identity.

Bulgaria manufactures many types of Soviet-era ammunition, anti-tank missiles, and light arms, and has extensive trade ties with other recovering Soviet countries for this reason.

The TurkStream natural gas pipeline project seemed to excite quite a few journalists. The project's European landfall is Bulgaria. TurkStream started shipping gas to Bulgaria, Greece and North Macedonia on 1 January 2020, after the personal intervention of Vladimir Putin. One journalist ran his article under the headline "How Bulgaria gave Gazprom the keys to the Balkans".

In 2020, five Russian diplomats and the Russian military attaché were expelled on grounds that they were engaging in espionage. Together with the two expelled on account of the Iliev scandal, eight Russian diplomats were expelled over 18 months to April 2021.

=== 2022-date ===
Prime Minister Kiril Petkov has introduced a political taboo on the use of Russian narratives, including the "special operation" label favoured by Vladimir Putin. Those who think otherwise so have to bear heavy political responsibility: the Bulgarian Minister of Defense, Stefan Yanev, was the first to be punished. He allowed himself to declare, following Putin, that it is not "war" in Ukraine but a "military operation". Petkov dismissed the minister on March 1, a scant week after the start of the Russian invasion of Ukraine.

Petkov recalled his ambassador to Russia, after Russian ambassador to Bulgaria Eleonora Mitrofanova conducted herself abysmally in the wake of the Russian invasion of Ukraine.

On 7 May 2022 the head of Bulgargaz, Ivan Topchiisky, announced that Bulgaria will be able to overcome its dependence on the Russian supplier Gazprom by the end of 2022. The demands of Gazprom to make payments for gas in rubles added fuel to the fire, and Sofia refused. Thus, Bulgaria turned out to be one of the two EU countries to which Russia cut off gas supplies, and this necessitated the urgent co-operation of EU Commissioner Ursula von der Leyen.

In early 2022, Petkov was sympathetic to Volodymyr Zelenskyy's repeated requests for military aid during his country's battle against the Russians but he faced the refusal of his coalition partner the Bulgarian Socialist Party (which is the successor to the Soviet-era Bulgarian Communist Party) and their leader Korneliya Ninova. On 4 May, Parliament approved the continuation of repairs to damaged Ukrainian military equipment, and will continue to support Ukraine's membership in the EU, as well as to the Ukrainian refugees from the war, who numbered more than 56,000 as of 7 June. Petkov noted Bulgaria's espousal of all sanctions against Russia, and would allow the use of the Port of Varna to transship goods that had been stifled by the Russian blockade of Odesa.

Bulgarias wish to see an end of Russian gas in the EU contributed to a decision to apply a high transit tax on gas being pumped through the country to Hungary and Serbia in October 2023, which caused an upset even though the tax would probably be paid by Gazprom, not Hungary or Serbia. In December, despite the European Commission agreeing that the law does not breach EU regulations, Bulgaria agreed to suspended the charge to avoid any issues during Bulgaria's pending Schengen Area application.

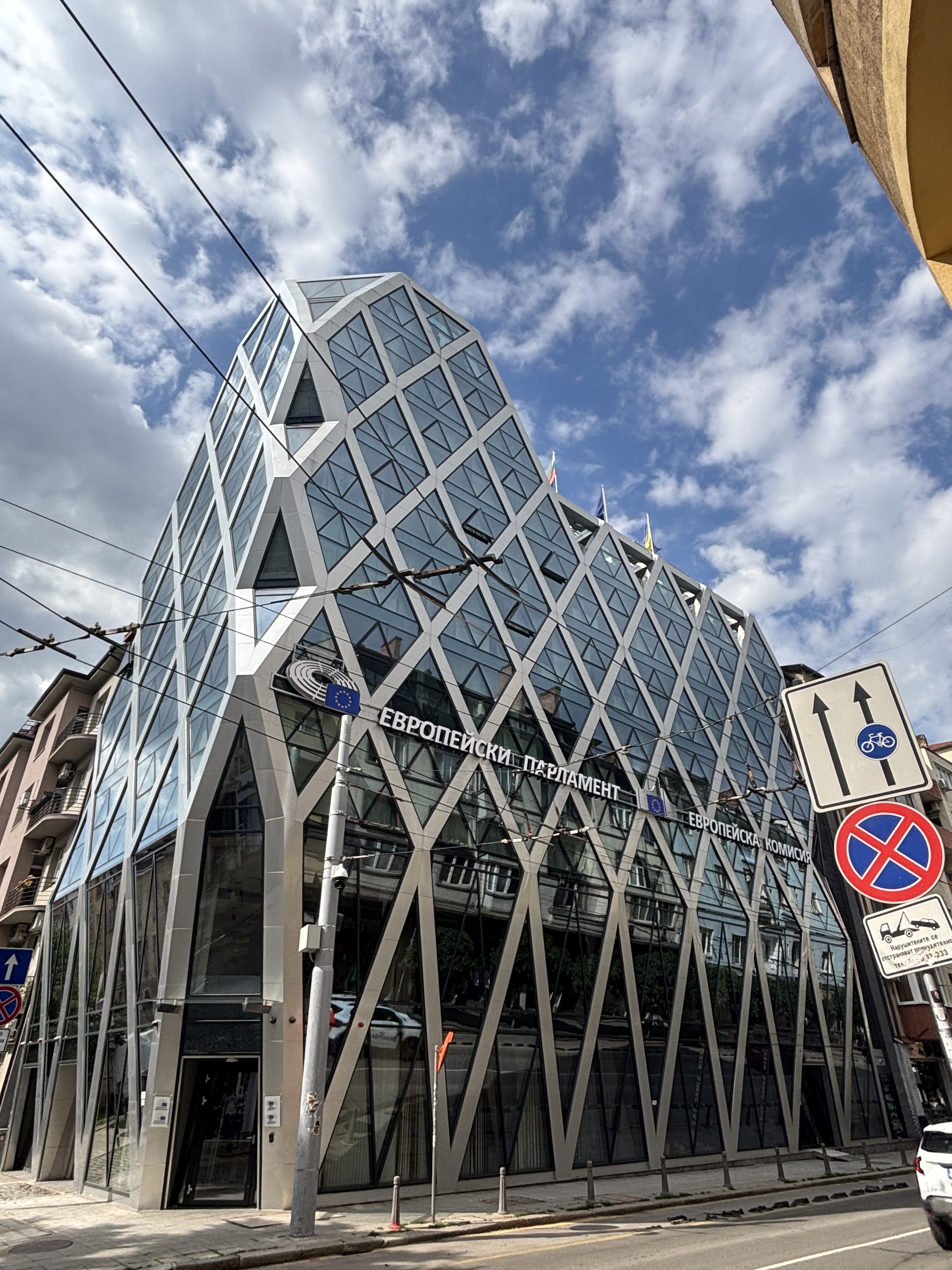
EU commission/parliament office Sofia, Bulgaria

== Bulgaria-NATO relations ==
Bulgaria joined NATO in 2004, three years before it acceded to the European Union.

In June 2016 Borisov and Plevneliev vetoed Romania's idea of forming a NATO flotilla in the Black Sea, one day after a stern warning from Russia. NATO partners Romania and Turkey had favoured the idea, along with Ukraine, which wanted to join any such initiative. The refusal came on the day of a visit of President Klaus Iohannis of Romania.

In 2018, Bulgaria ordered eight F-16V multirole fighter aircraft, to replace its aging fleet of Mig 29s. Together with service and training, they will cost $1.2 billion. The fleet of Mig 29s are serviced by their Russian manufacturer.

German manufacturer Lürssen was contracted to equip the Bulgarian Navy with new Multipurpose Modular Patrol Vessels (aka Offshore Patrol Vessels) built at the Bulgarian shipyard MTG Dolphin JSC, west of Varna. Lürssen is the prime contractor for the Bulgarian Ministry of Defence, while Swedish manufacturer Saab AB subcontracted to provide the electronics. The contract was valued at $593 million. The vessels are 90 meters long and displace 2,300 tons. The first was launched in August 2023 with delivery scheduled for 2025.

In December 2020 one Russian military attaché in Sofia was alleged to have gathered information on US service members stationed on Bulgarian territory during military exercises.

In 2021 six USAF F-16s operated from Bulgaria's Graf Ignatievo Air Base.

On 18 March 18 Bulgaria and Romania amended their 2011 Agreement on cross-border air policing.

In March 2021 six Bulgarians were charged with espionage and several Russian diplomats were expelled. The Bulgarian ring leader was a highly placed former official with the Ministry of Defense named Ivan Iliev, who corrupted his wife, and who trained military intelligence officers. Two Russian diplomats named Sergei Nikolashin and Vadim Bikov were expelled on 22 March 2021. Iliev was finally apprehended outside the Russian embassy, where he had intended to obtain asylum. Another arrest was that of Lyubomir Medarov who had until then been in charge of the office of classified communications and information of the Bulgarian parliament. Colonel Petar Petrov from the Ministry of Defense had access to the most highly classified documents about NATO activities. One observer characterized this event as the biggest story in Bulgarian defence since World War Two. Prosecutors alleged that the group "posed a serious threat to national security by collecting and handing to a foreign country state secrets of Bulgaria, NATO and the European Union." At the time of the arrests, several held senior positions in the Military Intelligence Service and the Ministry of Defence.

== Diplomatic relations ==
List of countries which Bulgaria maintains diplomatic relations with:

| # | Country | Date |
|---|---|---|
| 1 | Russia | 7 July 1879 |
| 2 | France | 8 July 1879 |
| 3 | Romania | 21 July 1879 |
| 4 | United Kingdom | 23 July 1879 |
| 5 | Italy | 25 July 1879 |
| 6 | Serbia | 6 September 1879 |
| 7 | Belgium | 11 December 1879 |
| 8 | Greece | 9 September 1880 |
| 9 | Iran | 15 November 1897 |
| 10 | United States | 19 September 1903 |
| 11 | Netherlands | 8 July 1909 |
| 12 | Spain | 5 August 1910 |
| 13 | Albania | April 1914 |
| 14 | Sweden | 6 July 1914 |
| 15 | Switzerland | 31 October 1915 |
| 16 | Norway | 20 April 1918 |
| 17 | Finland | 5 August 1918 |
| 18 | Poland | 30 December 1918 |
| 19 | Austria | November 1919 |
| 20 | Hungary | 9 August 1920 |
| 21 | Czech Republic | 27 September 1920 |
| 22 | Egypt | 5 November 1925 |
| 23 | Turkey | 30 October 1926 |
| 24 | Denmark | 17 April 1931 |
| 25 | Argentina | 8 July 1931 |
| 26 | Brazil | 17 September 1934 |
| 27 | Chile | 10 January 1935 |
| 28 | Mexico | 6 January 1938 |
| 29 | Japan | 2 October 1939 |
| 30 | Israel | 29 November 1948 |
| 31 | North Korea | 29 November 1948 |
| 32 | China | 3 October 1948 |
| 33 | Vietnam | 8 February 1950 |
| 34 | Mongolia | 22 April 1950 |
| 35 | Syria | 24 August 1954 |
| 36 | India | 22 December 1954 |
| 37 | Myanmar | 18 November 1955 |
| 38 | Ethiopia | 3 June 1956 |
| 39 | Sudan | 1 July 1956 |
| 40 | Tunisia | 30 August 1956 |
| 41 | Indonesia | 20 September 1956 |
| 42 | Luxembourg | 16 December 1956 |
| 43 | Uruguay | 6 August 1958 |
| 44 | Iraq | 14 August 1958 |
| 45 | Guinea | 2 January 1959 |
| 46 | Cambodia | 18 September 1960 |
| 47 | Somalia | 28 September 1960 |
| 48 | Cuba | 8 October 1960 |
| 49 | Mali | 23 October 1960 |
| 50 | Cyprus | 30 October 1960 |
| 51 | Democratic Republic of the Congo | 22 February 1961 |
| 52 | Ghana | 10 August 1961 |
| 53 | Afghanistan | 12 June 1961 |
| 54 | Morocco | 1 September 1961 |
| 55 | Sri Lanka | 10 June 1962 |
| 56 | Tanzania | 16 June 1962 |
| 57 | Benin | 25 June 1962 |
| 58 | Laos | 13 September 1962 |
| 59 | Sierra Leone | 28 September 1962 |
| 60 | Algeria | 10 October 1962 |
| 61 | Yemen | 12 October 1962 |
| 62 | Kuwait | 15 June 1963 |
| 63 | Libya | 1 June 1963 |
| 64 | Iceland | 27 December 1963 |
| 65 | Kenya | 14 February 1964 |
| 66 | Nigeria | 10 March 1964 |
| 67 | Uganda | 17 May 1964 |
| 68 | Jordan | 9 October 1964 |
| 69 | Burundi | 28 December 1964 |
| 70 | Republic of the Congo | 31 December 1964 |
| 71 | Pakistan | 15 June 1965 |
| 72 | Mauritania | 28 December 1965 |
| 73 | Canada | 30 June 1966 |
| 74 | Lebanon | 19 September 1966 |
| 75 | Singapore | 18 October 1967 |
| 76 | Ivory Coast | 15 December 1967 |
| 77 | Senegal | 28 December 1967 |
| 78 | Nepal | 15 April 1968 |
| 79 | Burkina Faso | 29 May 1968 |
| 80 | Zambia | 20 October 1968 |
| 81 | Malaysia | 4 January 1969 |
| 82 | Peru | 18 April 1969 |
| 83 | Central African Republic | 9 January 1970 |
| 84 | Costa Rica | 9 October 1970 |
| 85 | Bolivia | 18 December 1970 |
| 86 | Ecuador | 28 April 1971 |
| 87 | Malta | 11 September 1971 |
| 88 | Equatorial Guinea | 15 September 1971 |
| 89 | Bangladesh | 31 January 1972 |
| 90 | Australia | 5 April 1972 |
| 91 | Niger | 5 March 1973 |
| 92 | Panama | 21 March 1973 |
| 93 | Colombia | 11 May 1973 |
| 94 | Philippines | 16 November 1973 |
| 95 | Germany | 21 December 1973 |
| 96 | Guinea-Bissau | 2 June 1974 |
| 97 | Togo | 19 June 1974 |
| 98 | Portugal | 26 June 1974 |
| 99 | Venezuela | 2 August 1974 |
| 100 | Thailand | 10 August 1974 |
| 101 | Liberia | 1 November 1974 |
| 102 | Mauritius | 20 June 1975 |
| 103 | Mozambique | 25 June 1975 |
| 104 | Angola | 20 November 1975 |
| 105 | Gabon | 15 May 1976 |
| 106 | Madagascar | 15 June 1976 |
| 107 | Jamaica | 22 March 1977 |
| 108 | Guyana | 25 March 1977 |
| 109 | Comoros | 6 June 1977 |
| 110 | Nicaragua | 16 November 1979 |
| 111 | Rwanda | 20 December 1979 |
| 112 | São Tomé and Príncipe | 25 December 1979 |
| 113 | Zimbabwe | 18 April 1980 |
| 114 | Cape Verde | 5 June 1980 |
| 115 | Grenada | 9 June 1980 |
| 116 | Lesotho | 10 July 1980 |
| 117 | Seychelles | 14 August 1980 |
| 118 | Botswana | 16 August 1982 |
| 119 | Cameroon | 24 February 1984 |
| 120 | Maldives | 14 August 1984 |
| 121 | New Zealand | 9 October 1984 |
| — | State of Palestine | 8 December 1988 |
| 122 | Chad | 10 October 1989 |
| 123 | South Korea | 23 March 1990 |
| 124 | Namibia | 6 June 1990 |
| 125 | Ireland | 11 June 1990 |
| 126 | Qatar | 16 October 1990 |
| 127 | Oman | 17 June 1990 |
| — | Holy See | 6 December 1990 |
| 128 | Dominican Republic | 14 June 1991 |
| 129 | El Salvador | 26 June 1991 |
| 130 | Estonia | 10 September 1991 |
| 131 | Latvia | 10 September 1991 |
| 132 | Bahrain | 15 October 1991 |
| 133 | United Arab Emirates | 19 October 1991 |
| 134 | Lithuania | 10 December 1991 |
| 135 | Ukraine | 13 December 1991 |
| 136 | Armenia | 18 January 1992 |
| 137 | South Africa | 2 February 1992 |
| 138 | Moldova | 5 February 1992 |
| 139 | Barbados | 12 March 1992 |
| 140 | Belarus | 26 March 1992 |
| 141 | Turkmenistan | 20 May 1992 |
| 142 | Kyrgyzstan | 20 May 1992 |
| 143 | Azerbaijan | 5 June 1992 |
| 144 | Georgia | 5 June 1992 |
| 145 | Kazakhstan | 5 June 1992 |
| 146 | Croatia | 13 August 1992 |
| 147 | Slovenia | 18 August 1992 |
| 148 | Uzbekistan | 12 September 1992 |
| 149 | Paraguay | 2 December 1992 |
| 150 | Slovakia | 1 January 1993 |
| 151 | Eritrea | 31 May 1993 |
| 152 | Tajikistan | 24 August 1993 |
| 153 | North Macedonia | 22 December 1993 |
| 154 | Guatemala | 14 January 1994 |
| 155 | Belize | 15 February 1994 |
| 156 | Brunei | 14 April 1994 |
| 157 | Liechtenstein | 25 April 1994 |
| 158 | Andorra | 14 June 1994 |
| — | Sovereign Military Order of Malta | 11 November 1994 |
| 159 | Malawi | 23 November 1994 |
| 160 | Eswatini | 30 January 1995 |
| 161 | Saudi Arabia | 20 March 1995 |
| 162 | Bosnia and Herzegovina | 12 January 1996 |
| 163 | Gambia | 11 June 1999 |
| 164 | San Marino | 17 April 2000 |
| 165 | Nauru | 30 April 2001 |
| 166 | Antigua and Barbuda | 7 June 2001 |
| 167 | Timor-Leste | 21 January 2003 |
| 168 | Saint Vincent and the Grenadines | 11 September 2003 |
| 169 | Honduras | 7 May 2004 |
| 170 | Suriname | 20 September 2004 |
| 171 | Montenegro | 2 August 2006 |
| 172 | Djibouti | 13 February 2007 |
| 173 | Bahamas | 27 September 2007 |
| 174 | Monaco | 14 February 2008 |
| — | Kosovo | 27 May 2008 |
| 175 | Solomon Islands | 27 April 2011 |
| 176 | Dominica | 28 April 2011 |
| 177 | Tuvalu | 18 May 2011 |
| 178 | Trinidad and Tobago | 20 September 2011 |
| 179 | South Sudan | 28 September 2012 |
| 180 | Fiji | 25 May 2015 |
| 181 | Vanuatu | 24 June 2019 |
| 182 | Saint Lucia | 5 November 2020 |
| 183 | Palau | 7 July 2022 |
| 184 | Federated States of Micronesia | 20 October 2022 |
| 185 | Samoa | 8 May 2023 |
| 186 | Marshall Islands | 12 June 2023 |
| 187 | Kiribati | 17 July 2024 |
| 188 | Papua New Guinea | 14 February 2025 |

== Relations by region and country ==
=== Multilateral ===
| Organization | Formal Relations Began | Notes |
|---|---|---|
| Council of Europe | | Bulgaria joined the Council of Europe as a full member on 7 May 1992. |
| European Union | | See 2007 enlargement of the European Union Bulgaria joined the European Union as a full member on 1 January 2007. |
| NATO | | Bulgaria joined NATO as a full member on 29 March 2004. |

=== Africa ===
| Country | Formal Relations Began | Notes |
|---|---|---|
| Algeria | 1962 | Algeria has an embassy in Sofia.; Bulgaria has an embassy in Algiers.; Both countries are members of the Union for the Mediterranean. |
| Angola | 20 November 1975 | Since 1976, Bulgaria has an embassy in Luanda.; Angola is represented in Bulgaria through its embassy in Athens (Greece). |
| Egypt | 3 February 1926 | See Bulgaria–Egypt relations: Bulgaria has an embassy in Cairo.; Egypt has an embassy in Sofia.; Both countries are members of the Union for the Mediterranean.; Bulgarian embassy in Cairo |
| Ethiopia | | Bulgaria has an embassy in Addis Ababa.; Ethiopia is accredited to Bulgaria from its permanent mission to the United Nations in Geneva, Switzerland. |
| Kenya | | Bulgaria is accredited to Kenya from its embassy in Addis Ababa, Ethiopia.; Kenya is accredited to Bulgaria from its embassy in Berlin, Germany. |
| Libya | 30 June 1963 | HIV trial in Libya: In the late 1990s a Libyan children's hospital was the site of an outbreak of HIV infection that spread to over 400 patients. Libya blamed the outbreak on Bulgarian nurses and a Palestinian doctor, who were arrested and eventually sentenced to death. The international view was that Libya has used the medics as scapegoats for poor hygiene conditions, and Bulgaria with the support of its main allies the European Union and the United States repeatedly called on Tripoli to release them. The medics were finally extradited to Bulgaria and immediately pardoned at Sofia Airport on July 24, 2007. |
| Morocco | 1 September 1961 | Since January 1962, Bulgaria has an embassy in Rabat and an honorary consulate in Casablanca.; Morocco has an embassy in Sofia.; Both countries are members of the Francophonie and of the Union for the Mediterranean. |
| Nigeria | 1964 | Bulgaria has an embassy in Abuja.; Nigeria is accredited to Bulgaria from its embassy in Bucharest, Romania. |
| South Africa | 2 February 1992 | See Bulgaria–South Africa relations: Bulgaria has an embassy in Pretoria; Since 1992, South Africa has an embassy in Sofia. |
| Sudan | 1 July 1956 | See Bulgaria–Sudan relations: In 1967, Bulgaria sent the first Bulgarian ambassador to Khartoum. The activities of the Bulgarian embassy in Khartoum were terminated in April 1990.; Bulgaria is accredited to Sudan from its embassy in Cairo, Egypt.; Sudan has an embassy in Sofia. |
| Tunisia | 1956 | Bulgaria has an embassy in Tunis.; Tunisia is accredited to Bulgaria from its embassy in Belgrade, Serbia.; Both countries are members of the Union for the Mediterranean. |

=== Americas ===
| Country | Formal Relations Began | Notes |
|---|---|---|
| Argentina | 1931 | Argentina has an embassy in Sofia.; Bulgaria has an embassy in Buenos Aires. |
| Belize | 15 February 1994 | Bulgaria is represented in Belize through its embassy in Mexico City. |
| Brazil | 1934 | See Brazil–Bulgaria relations: Brazil has an embassy in Sofia.; Bulgaria has an embassy in Brasília. |
| Canada | 30 June 1966 | See Bulgaria–Canada relations: Bulgaria has an embassy in Ottawa and a consulate-general in Toronto.; Canada has a consulate in Sofia, and is represented through its embassy in Bucharest (Romania) for diplomatic matters. |
| Chile | 1935 | Bulgaria is accredited to Chile from its embassy in Buenos Aires, Argentina.; Chile is accredited to Bulgaria from its embassy in Bucharest, Romania and maintains an honorary consulate in Sofia. |
| Colombia | 8 May 1973 | Bulgaria is accredited to Colombia from its embassy in Brasília, Brazil.; Colombia is accredited to Bulgaria from its embassy in Warsaw, Poland. |
| Cuba | 1960 | Bulgaria has an embassy in Havana.; Cuba has an embassy in Sofia. |
| Dominica | | Bulgaria is represented in Dominica through its embassy in Havana, Cuba. |
| Ecuador | 1971 | Bulgaria is accredited to Ecuador from its embassy in Brasilia, Brazil.; Ecuador is accredited to Bulgaria from its embassy in Budapest, Romania and maintains an honorary consulate in Sofia. |
| Mexico | 6 January 1938 | See Bulgaria–Mexico relations: Bulgaria has an embassy in Mexico City.; Mexico is accredited to Bulgaria from its embassy in Budapest, Hungary and maintains an honorary consulate in Sofia. |
| Paraguay | 2 December 1992 | Bulgaria is accredited to Paraguay from its embassy in Buenos Aires, Argentina.; Paraguay is accredited to Bulgaria from its embassy in Rome, Italy. |
| Peru | 1969 | Peru closed its embassy in Sofia for economic reasons in 2003.; Bulgaria is accredited to Peru from its embassy in Brasilia, Brazil.; Peru is accredited to Bulgaria from its embassy in Athens, Greece. |
| United States | 1903 | See Bulgaria–United States relations Bulgarian-American relations, first formally established in 1903, have moved from missionary activity and American support for Bulgarian independence in the late 19th century to the growth of trade and commerce in the early 20th century, to reluctant hostility during World War I and open war and bombardment in World War II, to ideological confrontation during the Cold War, to partnership with the United States in the North Atlantic Treaty Organization (NATO) and growing political, military and economic ties in the beginning of the 21st century.: Bulgaria has an embassy in Washington, D.C., and consulates-general in Chicago, Los Angeles and New York City.; United States has an embassy in Sofia. |
| Uruguay | | Bulgaria is accredited to Uruguay from its embassy in Buenos Aires, Argentina.; Uruguay is accredited to Bulgaria from its embassy in Bucharest, Romania and maintains an honorary consulate in Sofia. |
| Venezuela | | Bulgaria is accredited to Venezuela from its embassy in Mexico City, Mexico.; Venezuela is accredited to Bulgaria from its embassy in Bucharest, Romania. |

=== Asia ===
| Country | Formal Relations Began | Notes |
|---|---|---|
| Afghanistan | 12 June 1961 | The ousted Islamic Republic of Afghanistan continues to maintain an embassy in Sofia.; Bulgaria had an embassy in Kabul but closed the embassy in March or April 2018 after bombing happened around the embassy.; During the 20 Years War and Insurgency, Bulgaria has sent 510 soldiers to contribute to the Islamic Republic of Afghanistan and specifically the International Security Assistance Force. Bulgaria also had 117 Troops funded to the Resolute Support Mission in Afghanistan but withdrew all of its forces on June 24, 2021, during the 2020-2021 Withdrawal of NATO and Western Forces from Afghanistan. |
| Armenia | 18 January 1992 | See Armenia–Bulgaria relations: Armenia has an embassy in Sofia.; Since December 19, 1999, Bulgaria has an embassy in Yerevan.; Both countries are members of the Council of Europe and the Organization of the Black Sea Economic Cooperation.; Around 30,000 people of Armenian descent are living in Bulgaria.; In 2015, Bulgaria recognized the Armenian Genocide |
| Azerbaijan | 5 June 1992 | See Azerbaijan–Bulgaria relations: Bulgaria recognized the independence of Azerbaijan on January 14, 1992.; Azerbaijan has an embassy in Sofia.; Bulgaria has an embassy in Baku.; Both countries are members of the Council of Europe and the Organization of the Black Sea Economic Cooperation. |
| China | 3 October 1949 | See Bulgaria–China relations: Bulgaria has an embassy in Beijing.; China has an embassy in Sofia.; Chinese Ministry of Foreign Affairs about relations with Bulgaria |
| Georgia | 5 June 1992 | See Bulgaria–Georgia relations: Bulgaria recognized the independence of Georgia on January 15, 1992.; Bulgaria has an embassy in Tbilisi.; Georgia has an embassy in Sofia.; Both countries are members of the Council of Europe and the Organization of the Black Sea Economic Cooperation.; Bulgaria is an EU member and Georgia is an EU candidate.; Georgian Ministry of Foreign Affairs about the relations with Bulgaria |
| India | 22 December 1954 | See Bulgaria–India relations: Bulgaria has an embassy in New Delhi and an honorary consulate in Kolkata.; India has an embassy in Sofia. |
| Indonesia | 20 September 1956 | See Bulgaria–Indonesia relations: Bulgaria was among the States that recognized Indonesia's independence on September 21, 1956, and the two countries established diplomatic relations.; Bulgaria has an embassy in Jakarta since October 1958 and Indonesia has had an embassy in Sofia since 1960. |
| Iran | 1897 | Since 1939, Bulgaria has an embassy in Tehran.; Iran has an embassy in Sofia. |
| Iraq | 14 August 1958 | See Bulgaria–Iraq relations: Bulgaria has an embassy in Baghdad.; Iraq has an embassy in Sofia.; Bulgaria was part of the Multinational force in Iraq between May 2003 and December 2008. |
| Israel | 4 December 1948 | See Bulgaria–Israel relations: Bulgaria has an embassy in Tel Aviv.; Israel has an embassy in Sofia.; Both countries are members of the Union for the Mediterranean. |
| Japan | 12 October 1939 | See Bulgaria–Japan relations: Both countries re-established diplomatic relations in September 1959.; Bulgaria has an embassy in Tokyo and an honorary consulate in Yokohama.; Japan has an embassy in Sofia.; Japanese Ministry of Foreign Affairs about relations with Bulgaria |
| Kazakhstan | 5 June 1992 | Since 1994, Bulgaria had an embassy in Almaty, later moved to Nur-Sultan.; Since November 2004, Kazakhstan has an embassy and an honorary consulate in Sofia. |
| Lebanon | 19 September 1966 | Since May 1967, Bulgaria has an embassy in Beirut.; Since 1983, Lebanon maintains an embassy in Sofia.; Both countries are members of the Francophonie and of the Union for the Mediterranean. |
| Mongolia | 22 April 1950 | See Bulgaria–Mongolia relations: Bulgaria has an embassy in Ulaanbaatar.; Mongolia has an embassy in Sofia. |
| North Korea | 29 November 1948 | Diplomatic relations were established on 29 November 1948.; Bulgaria maintains an embassy in Pyongyang, North Korea.; North Korea maintains an embassy in Sofia, Bulgaria.; Bulgarian Foreign Ministry on the relations between the two countries |
| Pakistan | 15 June 1965 | Since 1974, Bulgaria has an embassy in Islamabad.; Pakistan has an embassy in Sofia. |
| Palestine | November 1988 | Bulgaria established relations with the Palestine Liberation Organization in September 1975.; Bulgaria recognized the State of Palestine on 25 November 1988.; Palestine maintains an embassy in Sofia, Bulgaria. |
| Saudi Arabia | | Bulgaria has an embassy in Riyadh.; Saudi Arabia has an embassy in Sofia. |
| South Korea | 23 March 1990 | See Bulgaria–South Korea relations: The establishment of diplomatic relations between the Republic of Korea and Bulgaria began on 23 March 1990.; During the Cold War, the Republic of Bulgaria had diplomatic relations only with North Korea however, after the Cold War, Bulgaria has also had diplomatic relations with South Korea.; Bulgaria has an embassy in Seoul.; South Korea has an embassy in Sofia.; Bulgaria–South Korea relations |
| Syria | 24 July 1954 | See Bulgaria–Syria relations: Since May 1955, Bulgaria has an embassy in Damascus and an honorary consulate in Aleppo.; Syria has an embassy in Sofia.; Both countries are members of the Union for the Mediterranean. |
| Thailand | 10 August 1974 | Since 1975, Bulgaria has an embassy in Bangkok.; Thailand has an honorary consulate in Sofia.; There is a Thai village in Bulgaria since 2006 |
| Turkey | 18 October 1925 | See Bulgaria–Turkey relations: Bulgaria has an embassy in Ankara, 2 general consulates in Istanbul and Edirne, and a chancellery in Bursa.; Turkey has an embassy in Sofia and 2 general consulates in Plovdiv and Burgas.; Both countries are full members of the Council of Europe and NATO.; Bulgaria is an EU member and Turkey is an EU candidate. Bulgaria supports Turkey's accession negotiations to the EU, although negotiations have now been suspended. |
| United Arab Emirates | 19 October 1991 | See Bulgaria–United Arab Emirates relations: Bulgaria has a consulate-general in Dubai.; United Arab Emirates is accredited to Bulgaria from its embassy in Ankara, Turkey. |
| Uzbekistan | 12 September 1992 | See Bulgaria–Uzbekistan relations: Bulgaria has an embassy in Tashkent.; Uzbekistan is accredited to Bulgaria from its Ministry of Foreign Affairs in Tashkent. |
| Vietnam | 8 February 1950 | See Bulgaria–Vietnam relations: Bulgaria has an embassy in Hanoi.; Vietnam has an embassy in Sofia. |
| Yemen | 12 October 1962 | See Bulgaria–Yemen relations: Diplomatic relations were established with the Yemen Arab Republic on October 12, 1962, and with the People's Democratic Republic of Yemen on December 10, 1967. |

=== Europe ===
| Country | Formal Relations Began | Notes |
|---|---|---|
| Albania | 1922 | See Albania–Bulgaria relations: Albania has an embassy in Sofia and a consulate in Plovdiv.; Bulgaria has an embassy in Tirana and a consulate in Vlore.; Both countries are full members of NATO.; Albania is an EU candidate and Bulgaria is an EU member. |
| Andorra | 14 July 1993 | Both countries are members of the Council of Europe. |
| Austria | 7 July 1879 | See Austria–Bulgaria relations: Austria has an embassy in Sofia.; Bulgaria has an embassy in Vienna and an honorary consulate in Salzburg.; Both countries are full members of the European Union. |
| Belarus | 26 March 1992 | See Belarus–Bulgaria relations: Bulgaria recognized Belarus on December 23, 1991.; Belarus has an embassy in Sofia and an honorary consulate in Burgas.; Bulgaria has an embassy in Minsk. |
| Belgium | 1879 | See Belgium–Bulgaria relations: Belgium has an embassy in Sofia.; Bulgaria has an embassy in Brussels.; Both countries are members of the European Union, and of NATO and Francophonie. |
| Bosnia and Herzegovina | 15 January 1992 | See Bosnia and Herzegovina–Bulgaria relations: Since 1996, Bulgaria has an embassy in Sarajevo, and was the first country to recognize independent Bosnia and Herzegovina.; Bosnia and Herzegovina has an embassy in Sofia.; Both countries are members of the Southeast European Cooperation Process, Southeast European Cooperative Initiative, and the Stability Pact for Southeastern Europe.; Bosnia and Herzegovina is an EU candidate and Bulgaria is a member. |
| Croatia | 13 August 1992 | See Bulgaria–Croatia relations: Bulgaria has an embassy in Zagreb.; Croatia has an embassy in Sofia.; Both countries are full members of the European Union and NATO. |
| Cyprus | 30 October 1960 | See Bulgaria–Cyprus relations: Bulgaria was one of the first countries to recognize Cypriot independence on 30 October 1960.; Bulgaria has an embassy in Nicosia, and honorary consulate in Limassol.; Cyprus has an embassy in Sofia.; Both countries are full members of the European Union and the Council of Europe.; Cyprus Foreign Affairs: List of bilateral treaties with Bulgaria |
| Czech Republic | 27 September 1920 | See Bulgaria–Czech Republic relations: Relations were severed on June 1, 1939, and they were restored on October 10, 1945.; On December 23, 1992, Bulgaria recognised the Czech Republic and established diplomatic relations with it at the level of embassies as of January 1, 1993.; Bulgaria has an embassy and an honorary consulate in Prague.; Czech Republic has an embassy in Sofia and an honorary consulate in Varna.; Both countries are members of the European Union, NATO and the Organisation for Economic Co-operation and Development. |
| Denmark | 17 April 1931 | See Bulgaria–Denmark relations: Bulgaria has an embassy in Copenhagen.; Denmark has an embassy in Sofia.; Both countries are full members of the European Union and NATO. |
| Estonia | 20 May 1921 | See Bulgaria–Estonia relations: Bulgaria recognised Estonia on May 20, 1921, and re-recognised Estonia on August 26, 1991.; Both countries restored diplomatic relations on September 10, 1991.; In 2009, Bulgaria opened an embassy in Tallinn.; Estonia has an embassy and an honorary consulate in Sofia.; Both countries are full members of the European Union and NATO.; Estonian Ministry of Foreign Affairs about relations with Bulgaria |
| Finland | 5 August 1918 | See Bulgaria–Finland relations: In 1963, the diplomatic representations of the two countries were upgraded to the level of embassy.; Bulgaria has an embassy in Helsinki and an honorary consulate in Kemi.; Finland has an embassy in Sofia and an honorary consulate in Varna.; Both countries are full members of the European Union and of NATO.; Bulgaria fully supported Finland's application to join NATO, which resulted in membership on 4 April 2023.; Bulgarian embassy in Helsinki; Finnish Ministry of Foreign Affairs about relations with Bulgaria; Finnish embassy in Sofia |
| France | 8 July 1879 | See Bulgaria–France relations: Bulgaria has an embassy in Paris; France has an embassy in Sofia.; Both countries are full members of the European Union and NATO.; Bulgaria is a member of the Francophonie since 1993.; Former French president Nicolas Sarkozy played a role in the release of a Bulgarian nurse in the HIV trial in Libya.; Bulgarian embassy in Paris (in French only); French Foreign Ministry about relations with Bulgaria; French embassy in Sofia (in French and Bulgarian only) |
| Germany | 1879 | See Bulgaria–Germany relations: Bulgaria has an embassy in Berlin, a general-consulate in Munich and an office in Bonn.; Germany has an embassy in Sofia.; Both countries are full members of the European Union and NATO.; German Foreign Ministry about relations with Bulgaria |
| Greece | 1880 | See Bulgaria–Greece relations Relations between Greece and Bulgaria have been very cordial since the 1950s, due to the strong cultural, political and religious ties between the two nations, preceded in the earlier 20th century by periods of intense mutual hostility. Since Bulgaria's independence in 1876, Greece and Bulgaria faced each other in three major wars: the Second Balkan War, the First World War and the Second World War, in which Bulgaria briefly occupied parts of northern Greece.: Bulgaria has an embassy in Athens and a consulate-general in Thessaloniki.; Greece has an embassy in Sofia and a consulate-general in Plovdiv.; Both countries are full members of the European Union, NATO and of the Council of Europe. |
| Holy See | | See Holy See–Bulgaria relations: Diplomatic relations were restored on 6 December 1990. |
| Hungary | 9 August 1920 | See Bulgaria–Hungary relations: Bulgaria and Hungary (then a part of Austria-Hungary) were on the same side during World War I.; Bulgaria has an embassy in Budapest.; Hungary has an embassy in Sofia and an honorary consulate in Varna.; Both countries are full members of the European Union and NATO.; Bulgarian embassy in Budapest; Hungarian embassy in Sofia |
| Iceland | 27 December 1963 | See Bulgaria–Iceland relations: Bulgaria has a consular liaison section in the Danish Embassy in Reykjavik.; Both countries are members of the Council of Europe and NATO. |
| Ireland | 11 July 1990 | See Bulgaria–Ireland relations: Bulgaria has an embassy in Dublin.; Ireland has an embassy in Sofia.; Both countries are members of the European Union and Organisation for Economic Co-operation and Development. |
| Italy | 25 July 1879 | See Bulgaria–Italy relations: Bulgaria has an embassy in Rome, a general consulate in Milan and 6 honorary consulates (in Ancona, Florence, Genoa, Naples, Turin and Treviso).; Italy has an embassy in Sofia and an honorary consulate in Plovdiv.; Both countries are full members of the European Union and NATO. |
| Kosovo | 27 May 2008 | See Bulgaria–Kosovo relations: Kosovo declared its independence from Serbia on February 17, 2008, and Bulgaria recognized it on March 20, 2008.; Bulgaria has an embassy in Pristina.; Kosovo has an embassy in Sofia. |
| Latvia | 24 May 1922 | See Bulgaria–Latvia relations: Bulgaria is represented in Latvia through its Warsaw embassy in Poland and through an honorary consulate in Riga.; Latvia is represented in Bulgaria through its Warsaw embassy in Poland and through an honorary consulate in Sofia.; Both countries are full members of the European Union and NATO.; Latvian Ministry of Foreign Affairs about relations with Bulgaria |
| Liechtenstein | 19 November 1993 | Both countries are members of the Council of Europe. |
| Lithuania | 3 November 1924 | See Bulgaria–Lithuania relations: Bulgaria has an embassy in Vilnius.; Lithuania has an embassy in Sofia.; Both countries are full members of the European Union and NATO.; Lithuanian Ministry of Foreign affairs: list of bilateral treaties with Bulgaria (in Lithuanian only) |
| Luxembourg | 1956 | Both countries are full members of the European Union and NATO. |
| Malta | 10 September 1971 | Bulgaria is represented in Malta through its embassy in Rome (Italy).; Malta has honorary consulates in Sofia and Varna.; Both countries are full members of the European Union. |
| Moldova | 5 February 1992 | See Bulgaria–Moldova relations: Since 1992, Bulgaria has an embassy in Chişinău.; Moldova has an embassy in Sofia.; Bulgaria is an EU member and Moldova is an EU candidate. |
| Monaco | 14 February 2008 | Both countries are members of the Council of Europe. |
| Montenegro | 2 August 2006 | See Bulgaria–Montenegro relations: Bulgaria recognized the Republic of Montenegro on June 12, 2006.; Both countries are full members of NATO.; Bulgaria is an EU member and Montenegro is a candidate.; Bulgarian embassy in Podgorica (in Bulgarian only) |
| Netherlands | 1909 | See Bulgaria–Netherlands relations: Bulgaria has an embassy in The Hague.; The Netherlands has an embassy in Sofia.; Both countries are full members of the European Union and NATO.; Dutch Ministry of Foreign Affairs about relations with Bulgaria (in Dutch only) |
| North Macedonia | 15 January 1992 | See Bulgaria–North Macedonia relations: Bulgaria was the first country to recognize North Macedonia and the second to open an embassy.; The rules governing good neighbourly relations agreed between Bulgaria and the Republic of North Macedonia were set in the Joint Declaration of February 22, 1999, reaffirmed by a joint memorandum signed on January 22, 2008, in Sofia.; Both countries are full members of NATO.; Bulgaria is an EU member and North Macedonia is a candidate. |
| Norway | 20 August 1906 | See Bulgaria–Norway relations: Since April 1918, Bulgaria has an embassy in Oslo.; Norway is accredited to Bulgaria from its embassy in Bucharest, Romania.; Both countries are full members of NATO. |
| Poland | 30 December 1918 | See Bulgaria–Poland relations: Bulgaria has an embassy in Warsaw and an honorary consulate in Wrocław.; Poland has an embassy in Sofia.; Both countries are full members of the European Union and NATO. |
| Portugal | 1893 | See Bulgaria–Portugal relations: Relations were severed in 1945 and were restored on June 24, 1974.; Bulgaria has an embassy and an honorary consulate in Lisbon.; Portugal has an embassy in Sofia.; Both countries are full members of the European Union and NATO. |
| Romania | | See Bulgaria–Romania relations Bulgarian relations with Romania featured regular official visits by the two presidents. Romanian-Bulgarian relations are developing "very intensively" because of EU accession, since Romania and Bulgaria joined the European Union in 2007. Romania and Bulgaria have never had any serious conflicts, other than a territorial dispute over the Dobruja region in 1913–1940, now largely forgotten. Vidin and Calafat have perhaps the closest relations of any towns along this lower section of the Danube. There is a regular ferry service, so locals here have regular interchange with their neighbors across the border.: Bulgaria has an embassy in Bucharest.; Romania has an embassy in Sofia.; Both countries are full members of the European Union and of NATO. |
| Russia | 7 July 1879 | See Bulgaria–Russia relations: Bulgaria has an embassy in Moscow and three consulates general in Saint Petersburg, Novosibirsk and Yekaterinburg.; Russia has an embassy in Sofia and consulates generals in Ruse and Varna.; Russia was the first country to recognize Bulgaria, and greatly helped Bulgaria in its war of independence from Ottoman Turkey.; Both countries are full members of the OSCE.; Bulgaria is a Council of Europe member state and Russia is a former member state. |
| San Marino | 17 April 2000 | Both countries are members of the Council of Europe. |
| Serbia | 18 January 1879 | See Bulgaria–Serbia relations: There are between 20,000 and 30,000 Bulgarians who are living in Serbia.; Bulgaria has an embassy in Belgrade.; Serbia has an embassy in Sofia.; Bulgaria is an EU member and Serbia is a candidate. |
| Slovakia | 1 January 1993 | See Bulgaria–Slovakia relations: Bulgaria recognized Slovakia on December 23, 1992.; Since February 1994, Bulgaria has an embassy in Bratislava.; Since June 1994, Slovakia has an embassy in Sofia.; Both countries are full members of the European Union and NATO. |
| Slovenia | 1992 | See Bulgaria–Slovenia relations: Bulgaria has an embassy in Ljubljana.; Slovenia is represented in Bulgaria through its embassy in Budapest (Hungary).; Both countries are full members of the European Union and NATO. |
| Spain | 8 May 1910 | See Bulgaria–Spain relations: Relations were severed in 1946 and they were restored at the level of consular office and Trade Mission in 1970.; Since January 27, 1970, the diplomatic relations were elevated to embassy-level.; Bulgaria has an embassy in Madrid and an honorary consulate in Barcelona.; Spain has an embassy in Sofia.; Both countries are full members of the European Union and NATO.; Spanish Ministry of Foreign Affairs about relations with Bulgaria (in Spanish only) |
| Sweden | 6 June 1914 | See Bulgaria–Sweden relations: Since 1915, Bulgaria has an embassy in Stockholm.; Sweden has an embassy in Sofia and an honorary consulate in Varna.; Both countries are full members of the European Union, NATO and the Council of Europe.; Bulgaria fully supported Sweden's application to join NATO, which resulted in membership on 7 March 2024. |
| Switzerland | 14 November 1916 | See Bulgaria–Switzerland relations: Switzerland officially recognized Bulgaria on November 28, 1879.; Bulgaria has an embassy in Bern.; Switzerland has an embassy in Sofia.; Swiss Federal Department of Foreign Affairs about relations with Bulgaria |
| Turkey | 18 October 1925 | See Turkey in Asia Above |
| Ukraine | 13 December 1991 | See Bulgaria–Ukraine relations: Bulgaria has an embassy in Kyiv (see Embassy of Bulgaria, Kyiv) and a consulate-general in Odesa.; Ukraine has an embassy in Sofia (see Embassy of Ukraine, Sofia) and a consulate-general in Bourgas, Varna, Plovdiv and Ruse.; Bulgaria is an EU member and Ukraine is an EU candidate.; Ukrainian-Bulgarian relations are characterized by a constant active political dialogue at the highest level. Ukraine and Bulgaria actively cooperate and provide mutual support within the framework of regional and international organizations, such as the BSEC, the Central European Initiative, the OSCE, the Council of Europe, the United Nations. Bulgaria, has confirmed readiness to promote the European and Euro-Atlantic integration of Ukraine. It occupies an important place in the Balkan direction of Ukraine's foreign policy interests, which is due to the geopolitical position of the country in the Balkans, the proximity of interests in the Black Sea and the Danube region. Ukraine and Bulgaria are united by ethnic, linguistic and religious components, traditional economic, trade and cultural-historical ties. Bulgaria is an important market for Ukrainian products and the largest trade and economic partner of Ukraine in the Balkan region. In 2017, foreign trade between Ukraine and Bulgaria demonstrated growth dynamics. |
| United Kingdom | 23 July 1879 | See Bulgaria–United Kingdom relations Bulgaria established diplomatic relations with the United Kingdom on 23 July 1879.: Bulgaria maintains an embassy in London.; The United Kingdom is accredited to Bulgaria through its embassy in Sofia.; Both countries share common membership of the Council of Europe, NATO, OSCE, and the World Trade Organization. Bilaterally the two countries have an Investment Agreement, and a Strategic Partnership. |

=== Oceania ===
| Country | Formal Relations Began | Notes |
|---|---|---|
| Australia | 5 April 1972 | Australia is accredited to Bulgaria from its embassy in Athens, Greece and maintains an honorary consulate in Sofia.; Bulgaria has an embassy in Canberra. |
| New Zealand | 9 October 1984 | Bulgaria is accredited to New Zealand from its embassy in Canberra, Australia.; New Zealand is accredited to Bulgaria from its embassy in Brussels, Belgium. |

== See also ==
- List of diplomatic missions in Bulgaria
- List of diplomatic missions of Bulgaria
- List of joint US-Bulgarian military bases
