= Arnaud (given name) =

- Gender: masculine
- Language: French

Other names
- See also: Arnold

Arnaud or Arnault is the French form of the German given name Arnold. It derives from the Germanic roots, arn (eagle), and wald (power).

People named Arnaud include

- Arnaud Amalric (died 1225), Cistercian monk involved with the Inquisition
- Arnaud Amanieu, Lord of Albret (1338–1401), French nobleman and Lord of Albret
- Arnaud Anastassowa (born 1988), French-Bulgarian footballer
- Arnaud Assoumani (born 1985), French long jumper
- Arnaud Aubert (died 1371), French archbishop
- Arnaud Baille/Sicre (c. 1250–c. 1350), French cobbler and informer for the Inquisition
- Arnaud Balijon (born 1983), French football goalkeeper
- Arnaud Bédat (1965–2023), Swiss journalist
- Arnaud Beltrame (1973–2018), French gendarme lieutenant colonel murdered after swapping himself for a hostage
- Arnaud Berquin (1747–1791), French author
- Arnaud Bertheux (born 1977), French footballer
- Arnaud Blin (born 1963), French historian and political scientist
- Arnaud Boetsch (born 1969), French tennis player
- Arnaud Boiteau (born 1973), French equestrian
- Arnaud Brocard (born 1986), French football goalkeeper
- Arnaud Bühler (born 1985), Swiss footballer
- Arnaud Casquette (born 1978), Mauritian long jumper
- Arnaud Chaffanjon, French genealogist
- Arnaud Clément (born 1977), French tennis player
- Arnaud Costes (born 1973), French rugby union footballer
- Arnaud Cotture (born 1995), Swiss basketball player
- Arnaud Démare (born 1991), French racing cyclist
- Arnaud Denjoy (1884–1974), French mathematician
- Arnaud Desjardins (1925–2011), French author and producer
- Arnaud Desplechin (born 1960), French film director
- Arnaud Dos Santos (born 1945), French former footballer and coach
- Arnaud Di Pasquale (born 1979), French former tennis player
- Arnaud Gamaleri (born 2005), French sport shooter
- Arnaud Gérard (born 1984), French road bicycle racer
- Arnaud Geyre (1935–2018), French former racing cyclist
- Arnaud Hybois (born 1982), French sprint canoer
- Arnaud II de La Porte (1737–1792), French statesman and government minister
- Arnaud I de La Porte (1706–1770), French statesman
- Arnaud Kalimuendo (born 2002), French footballer
- Arnaud Kouyo (born 1984), Ivoirian footballer
- Arnaud Labbe (born 1976), French racing cyclist
- Arnaud Lagardère (born 1961), the CEO of Lagardère Group
- Arnaud Larrieu (born 1966), French film director and writer
- Arnaud Le Gall (born 1980), French politician
- Arnaud Le Lan (born 1978), French footballer
- Arnaud Lebrun (born 1973), French former footballer
- Arnaud Lescure (born 1986), French footballer
- Arnaud Lisembart (born 1984), French former footballer
- Arnaud Maggs (1926–2012), Canadian artist and photographer
- Arnaud Maire (born 1979), French footballer
- Arnaud Malherbe (born 1972), South African sprinter
- Arnaud Margueritte (born 1973), French former football goalkeeper
- Arnaud Cartwright Marts (1888–1970), interim president of Bucknell University from 1935 to 1945
- Arnaud Massy (1877–1950), French golfer
- Arnaud Merklé (born 1998), French badminton player
- Arnaud Merlin (born 1963), French jazz critic, music journalist and radio producer
- Arnaud Monney (born 1981), Ivorian footballer
- Arnaud Mussy (born 1968), French former religious leader
- Arnaud Nordin (born 1998), French footballer
- Arnaud Segodo (born 1984), Beninese tennis player
- Arnaud Simion (born 1968), French politician
- Arnaud Tsamere (born 1975), French comedian, actor and television presenter
- Arnaud Courlet de Vregille (born 1958), French painter
