= Bulgarians in France =

Bulgarians in France Българи във Франция Bulgares en France
Total population
- 30,000 - 80,000

Regions with significant populations
- Paris, Marseille, Lyon, Strasbourg, Nice, etc.

Languages
- Bulgarian, French

Religion
- Bulgarian Orthodox Church

Related ethnic groups
- Bulgarian diaspora

Bulgarians in France (Bulgarian: Българи във Франция, French: Bulgares en France), are one of the immigrant communities of the Bulgarian diaspora. Over 34,000 Bulgarians live in France, with the main concentration in Paris. They form one of the oldest communities of Bulgarians in Western Europe.

== History ==
It is thought that individual groups of Bulgars reached modern France in the Migration Period (5th–6th century). In the 12th and 13th centuries, Bulgarian heretics came to France spreading the ideas of Bogomilism, which provided much of the theological basis of Catharism. The Cathars or Albigensians were also known as bougres, pointing to the Bulgarian origin of the sect.

It was not until the mid-19th century that contacts between France and the Bulgarian lands were intensified. France was an attractive centre for Bulgarian students abroad even before the Liberation of Bulgaria in 1878. Bulgarian public figure Nikola Pikolo spent the years from 1840 to his death in 1865 in Paris. Petar Beron, another Bulgarian enlightener, was also active in Paris in the 1850s and 1860s.

From 1879 on, France was the favoured destination for Bulgarians seeking higher education abroad, with particular domination in the fields of pharmacy and medicine. In 1926–1927, for example, of the 1,247 Bulgarians studying abroad, 537 were based in France; of those, 172 studied medicine. Germany took the place of France in the 1930s in terms of higher education.

Despite the sizable distance between France and the Balkans, there are reports of Bulgarian gardeners around Metz as early as 1870. Gardeners were the leading force of Bulgarian economic emigration. In 1930, there were 326 Bulgarian gardeners in France. It is estimated that the entire Bulgarian community in France numbered some 1,000–2,000 in 1945.

Historian Yordan Kolev estimates the number of Bulgarians permanently residing in France as of 2000 as 9,500. According to the same scholar, another group of over 20,000 Bulgarians are temporarily residing, studying and working in France.

== Notable people ==
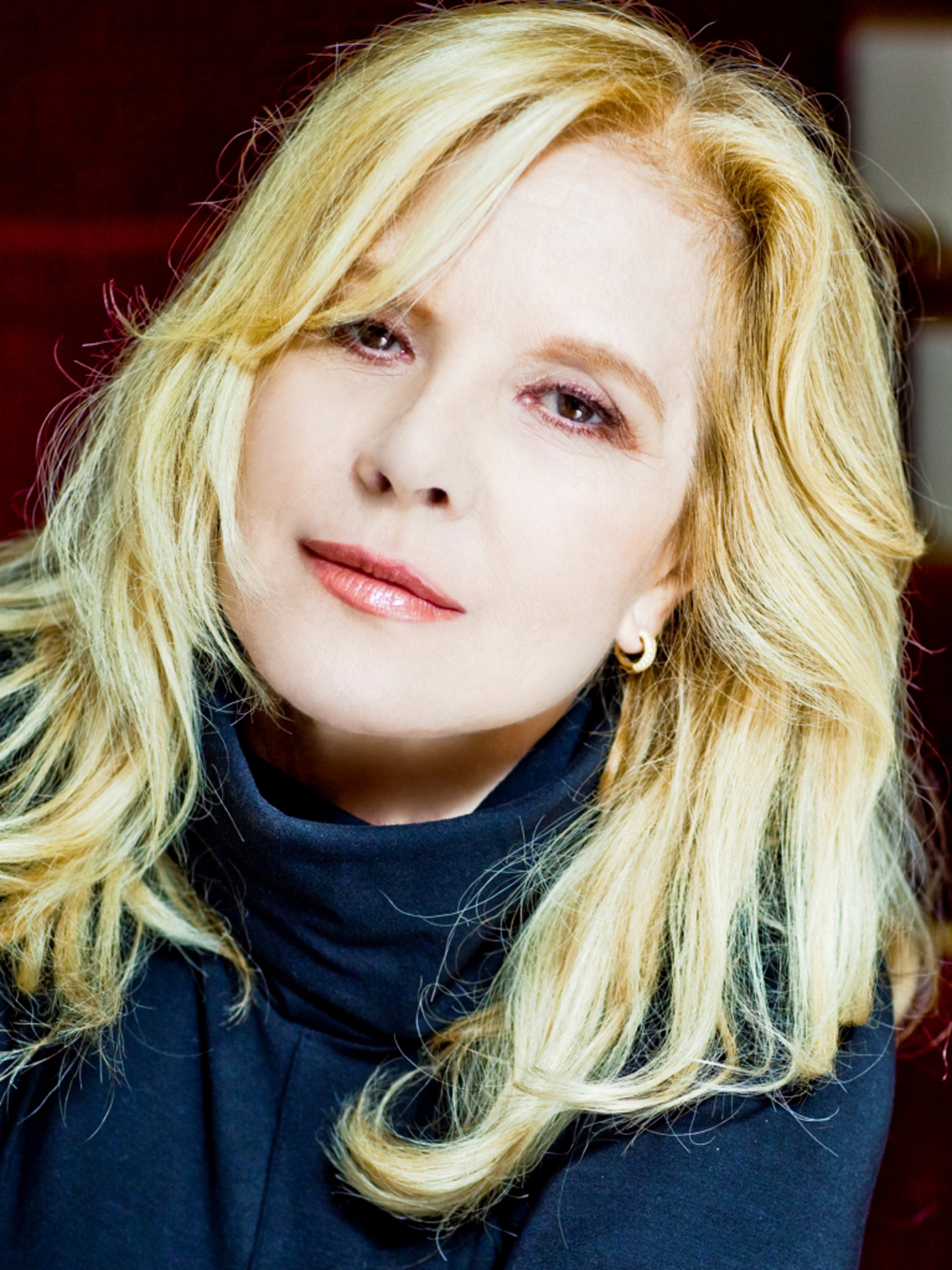
Sylvie Vartan

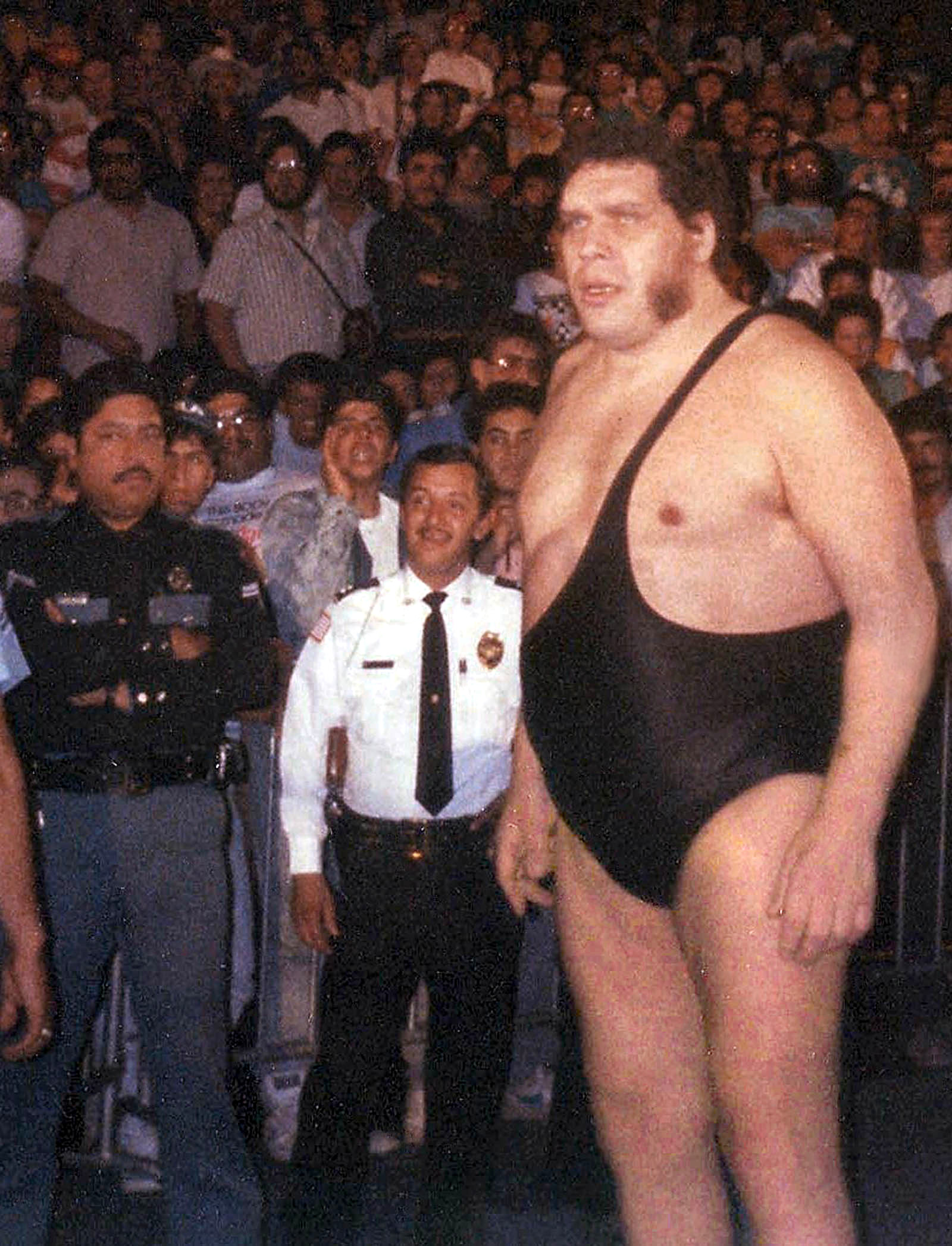
André the Giant

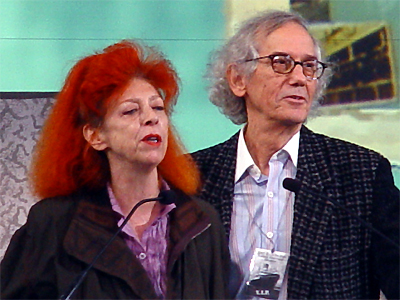
Christo

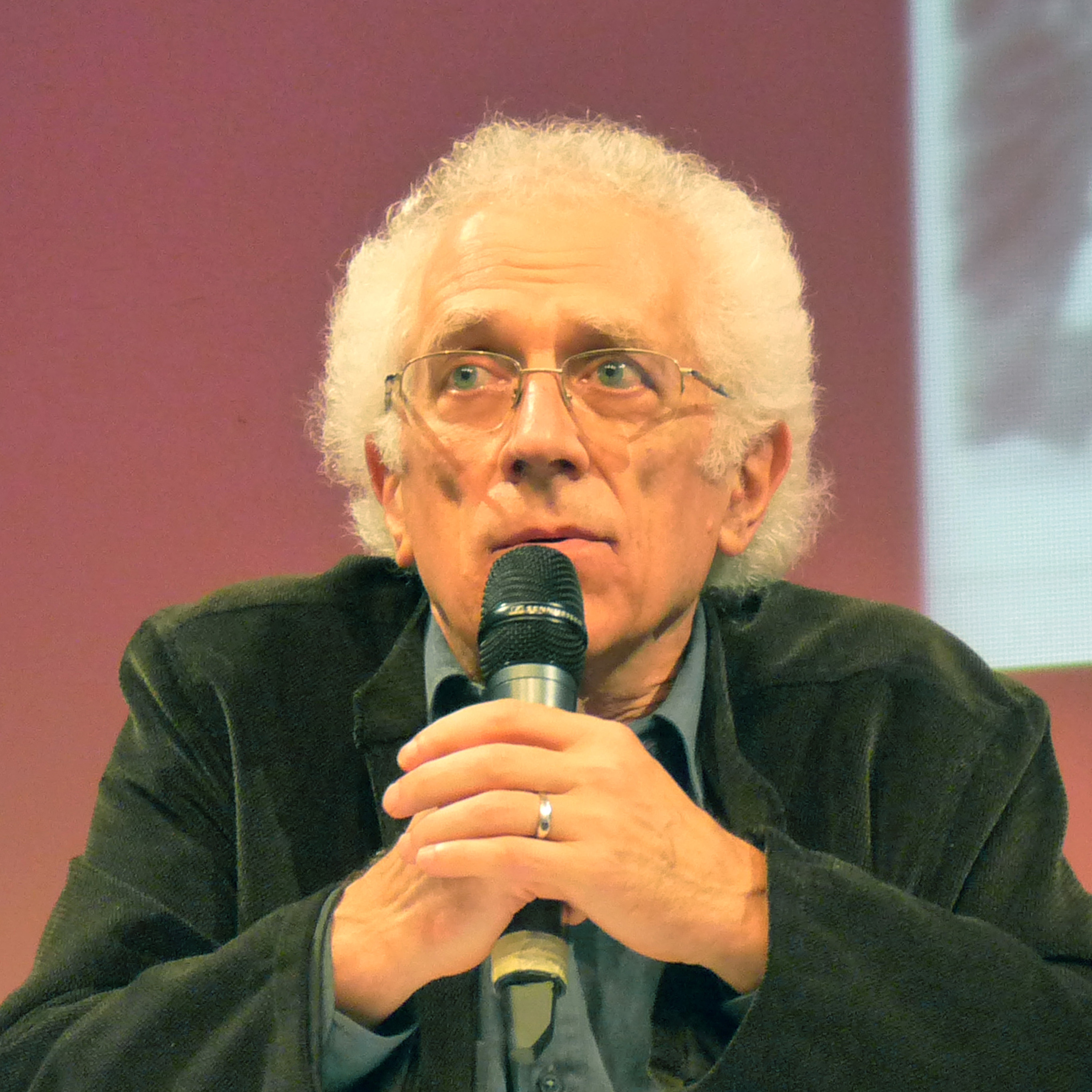
Tzvetan Todorov
- Albert Aftalion (1874–1956), economist of Bulgarian Jewish descent
- Alexandre Coeff (b. 1992), football defender
- Arnaud Anastassowa (b. 1988), football defender
- André the Giant (1946–1993), professional wrestler and actor from the WWF
- Artine Artinian (1907–2005), literature scholar of Bulgarian Armenian descent
- Christo Javacheff (b. 1935), worldwide famous artist who creates spatial art installations
- Raphaël Bassan (b. 1948), film critic and journalist
- David Hallyday (b. 1966), singer/songwriter and amateur sports car racer.
- Maria Koleva (b. 1940), filmmaker
- Julia Kristeva (b. 1941), philosopher, literary critic, psychoanalyst, sociologist, feminist and novelist
- George Papazov (1894–1972), painter
- Jules Pascin (1885–1930), painter
- Tzvetan Todorov (b. 1939–2017), philosopher
- Andrei Nakov (b. 1941), art historian
- Michael Vartan (b. 1968), film and television actor
- Sylvie Vartan (b. 1944), pop singer of Bulgarian-Armenian-Hungarian descent
- Nikolay Nenovsky (b. 1963), economist
- Vesselin Vassilev (b. 1974), artist, painter and printmaker

== See also ==
- Bulgaria–France relations
- Bulgarian diaspora
- Immigration to France
