= History of French foreign relations =

The history of French foreign relations covers French diplomacy and foreign relations down to 1981. For the more recent developments, see foreign relations of France.

== Valois and Bourbon France: 1453–1789 ==
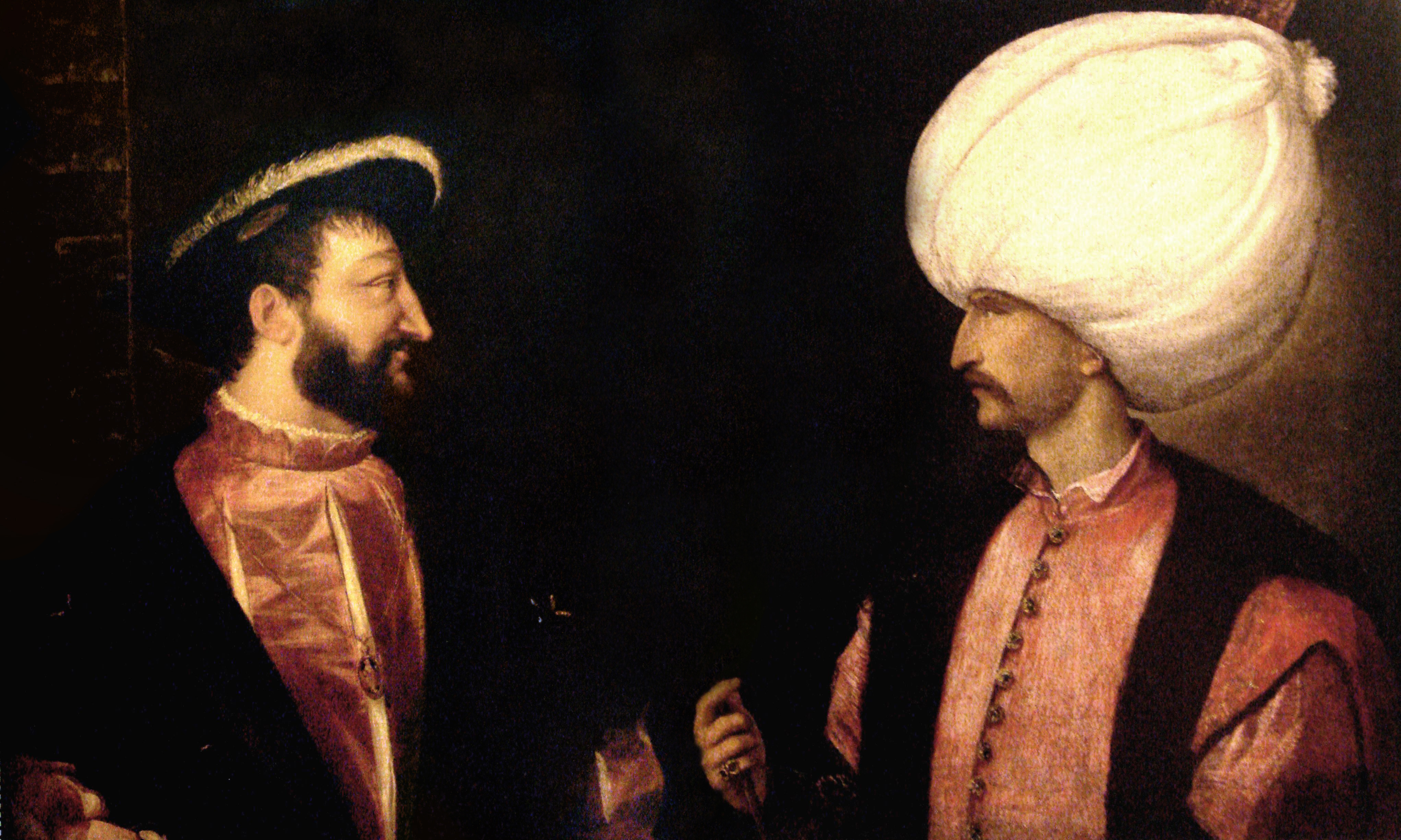
Francis I (left) and Suleiman I the Magnificent (right) initiated the Franco-Ottoman alliance. They never met in person; this is a composite of two separate paintings by Titian, circa 1530.

=== Franco-Ottoman alliance ===
The Franco-Ottoman alliance was a military alliance established in 1536 between King Francis I of France and the Ottoman sultan Suleiman I. The strategic and sometimes tactical alliance was one of the most important foreign alliances of France, and was particularly influential during the Italian Wars. It enabled France to fight the Holy Roman Empire under Charles V on equal terms. The Franco-Ottoman military alliance reached its peak around 1553 during the reign of Henry II of France. The alliance was exceptional, as the first alliance between a Christian and Muslim state, and caused a scandal in the Christian world, especially since France was heavily committed to support Catholicism. Carl Jacob Burckhardt called it "the sacrilegious union of the lily and the crescent". It lasted intermittently for more than two and a half centuries, until the Napoleonic invasion of Ottoman Egypt, in 1798–1801.

=== Louis XIV and Louis XV ===
Under the long reigns of kings Louis XIV (1643–1715) and Louis XV (1715–1774), France was second in size to Russia but first in terms of economic and military power. It fought numerous expensive wars, usually to protect its voice in the selection of monarchs in neighboring countries. A high priority was blocking the growth of power of the Habsburg rivals who controlled Austria and Spain.

Warfare defined the foreign policies of Louis XIV, and his personality shaped his approach. Impelled "by a mix of commerce, revenge, and pique", Louis sensed that warfare was the ideal way to enhance his glory. In peacetime he concentrated on preparing for the next war. He taught his diplomats their job was to create tactical and strategic advantages for the French military.

Louis XIV had at his service many notable military commanders and an excellent support staff. His chief engineer Vauban (1633–1707) perfected the arts of fortifying French towns and besieging enemy cities. The finance minister Jean-Baptiste Colbert (1619–83) dramatically improved the financial system so that it could support an army of 250,000 men. The system deteriorated under Louis XV so that wars drained the increasingly inefficient financial system. Louis XIV made France prouder in psychology but poorer in wealth; military glory and cultural splendor were exalted above economic growth.

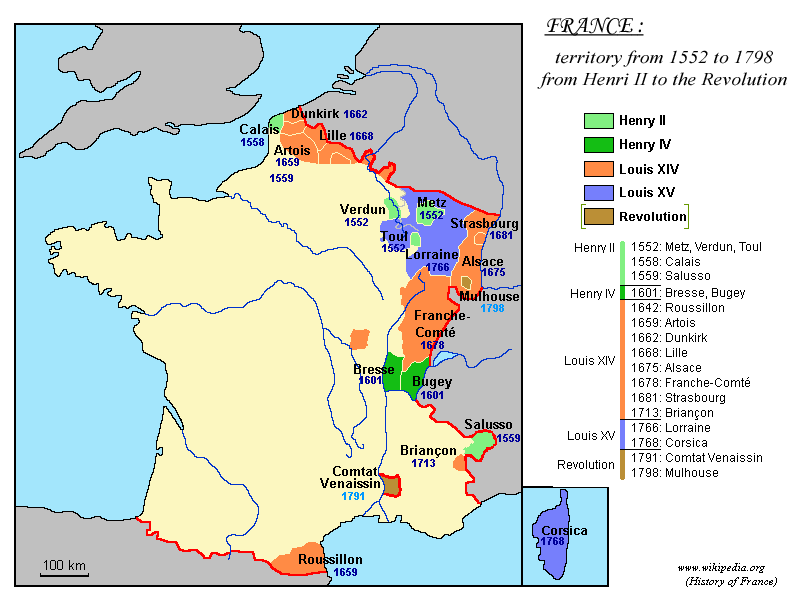
Territorial expansion of France under Louis XIV is depicted in orange.

Under Louis XIV, France fought three major wars: the Franco-Dutch War, the War of the League of Augsburg, and the War of the Spanish Succession. There were also two lesser conflicts: the War of Devolution and the War of the Reunions.

Louis XV did merge Lorraine and Corsica into France. However France was badly defeated in the Seven Years' War (1754–1763) and forced to give up its holdings in North America. It ceded New France to Great Britain and Louisiana to Spain, and was left with a bitter grudge that sought revenge in 1778 by helping the Americans win independence. Louis XV's decisions damaged the power of France, weakened the treasury, discredited the absolute monarchy, and made it more vulnerable to distrust and destruction, as happened in the French Revolution, which broke out 15 years after his death. Norman Davies characterized Louis XV's reign as "one of debilitating stagnation", characterized by lost wars, endless clashes between the Court and Parliament, and religious feuds. A few scholars defend Louis, arguing that his highly negative reputation was based on propaganda meant to justify the French Revolution. Jerome Blum described him as "a perpetual adolescent called to do a man's job."

=== American Revolutionary War ===
France played a key role helping the American Patriots win their War of Independence against Britain 1775–1783. Motivated by a long-term rivalry with Britain and by revenge for its territorial losses during Seven Years' War, France began secretly sending supplies in 1775. In 1777, American captured the British invasion army at Saratoga, demonstrating the viability of their revolt. In 1778, France recognized the United States of America as a sovereign nation, signed a military alliance and went to war with Britain. France built a coalitions with Netherlands and Spain, provided Americans with money and arms, sent a combat army to serve under George Washington, and sent a navy that prevented the second British army from escaping from Yorktown in 1781.

India was a major battlefield, in which France tried to form alliances with Indian states against the British-controlled East India Company. Under Warren Hastings, the British managed to hold their own throughout the war. When the war began Britain quickly seized all of France's Indian possessions, especially Pondicherry. They were returned to France in the 1783 peace treaty.

By 1789, the French debt acquired to fight in that war came to a staggering 1.3 billion livres. It "set off France's own fiscal crisis, a political brawl over taxation that soon became one of the reasons for French Revolution." France did obtain its revenge against Britain, but materially it gained little and its huge debts seriously weakened the government and helped facilitate the French Revolution in 1789.

Benjamin Franklin served as the American ambassador to France from 1776 to 1785. He met with many leading diplomats, aristocrats, intellectuals, scientists and financiers. Due to the popularity of his writings, Franklin became the cultural icon of the archetypal new American, and his ideas gave rise to aspirations for a new order inside France.

== French Revolution and Napoleon: 1789–1815 ==
=== French Revolution ===
After the stated aim of the National Convention to export revolution, the guillotining of Louis XVI of France, and the French opening of the Scheldt, a European military coalition was formed against France. Spain, Naples, Great Britain, and the Netherlands joined Austria and Prussia in The First Coalition (1792–97), the first major concerted effort of multiple European powers to contain Revolutionary France. It took shape after the wars had already begun.

The Republican government in Paris was radicalised after a diplomatic coup for the Jacobins said it would be the Guerre Totale ("total war") and called for a Levée en masse (mass conscription of troops). Royalist invasion forces were defeated at Toulon in 1793, leaving the French republican forces in an offensive position and granting nationwide fame to a young hero, Napoleon Bonaparte (1769–1821). Following their victory at Fleurus, the French occupied Belgium and the Rhineland. An invasion of the Netherlands established the puppet Batavian Republic. Finally, a peace agreement was concluded between France, Spain, and Prussia in 1795 at Basel.

=== Napoleonic wars ===
By 1799 Napoleon had seized power in France and proved highly adept at warfare and coalition building. Britain led a series of shifting coalitions to oppose him. After a brief truce in 1802–3, war resumed. In 1806 Prussia joined Britain and Russia, thus forming the Fourth Coalition. Napoleon was not alone since he now had a complex network of allies and subject states. The largely outnumbered French army crushed the Prussian army at Jena-Auerstedt in 1806; Napoleon captured Berlin and went as far as Eastern Prussia. There the Russian Empire was defeated at the Battle of Friedland (14 June 1807). Peace was dictated in the Treaties of Tilsit, in which Russia had to join the Continental System, and Prussia handed half of its territories to France. The Duchy of Warsaw was formed over these territorial losses, and Polish troops entered the Grande Armée in significant numbers.

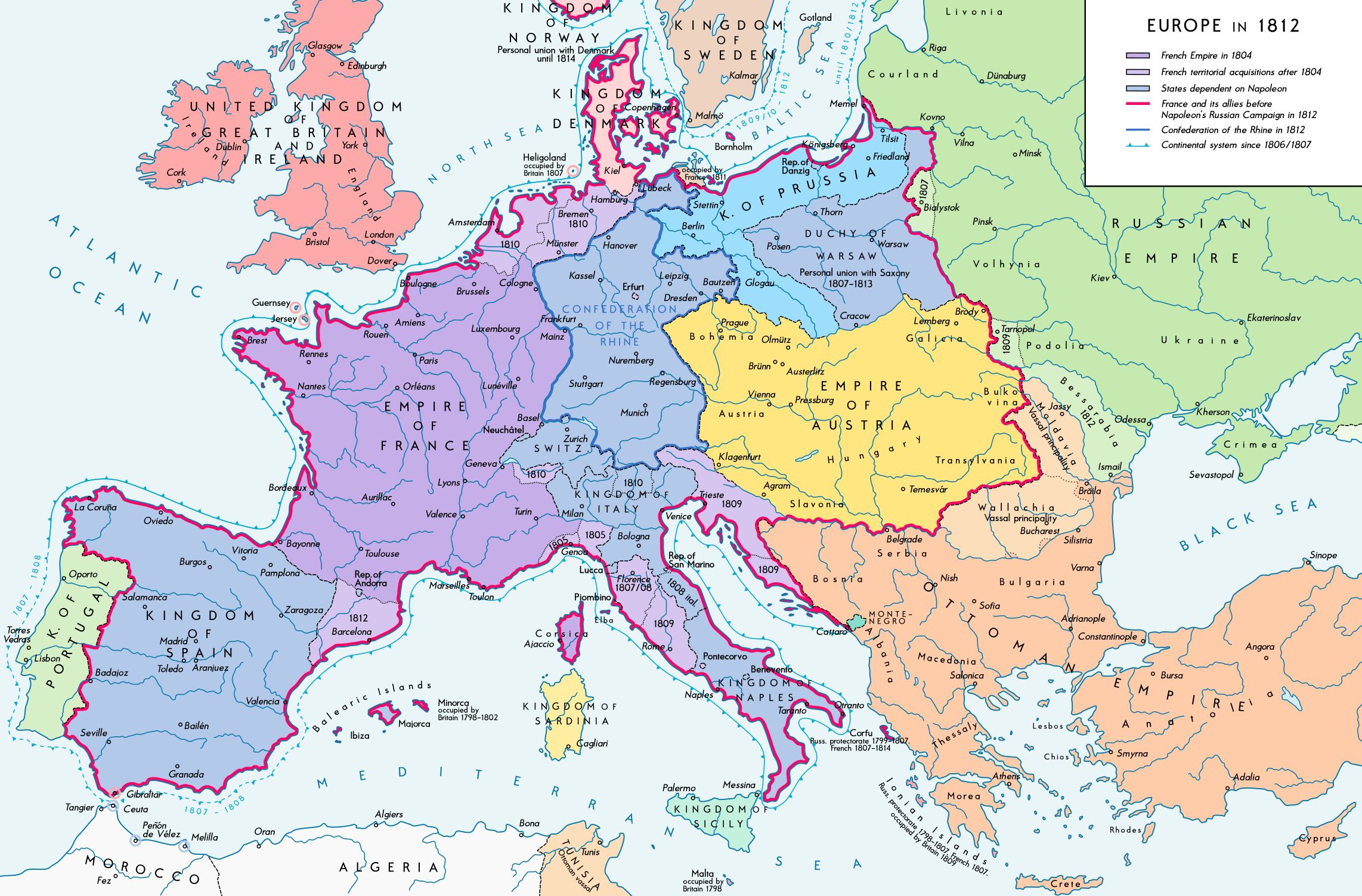
Europe on the eve of Napoleon's Russian campaign in 1812, on the height of the First Empire

Napoleon then went back to the west, to deal with Britain. Only two countries remained neutral in the war: Sweden and Portugal, and Napoleon then looked toward the latter. In the Treaty of Fontainebleau, a Franco-Spanish alliance against Portugal was sealed as Spain eyed Portuguese territories. French armies entered Spain in order to attack Portugal, but then seized Spanish fortresses and took over the kingdom by surprise. Joseph Bonaparte, Napoleon's brother, was made King of Spain after Charles IV abdicated. This occupation of the Iberian peninsula fueled local nationalism, and soon the Spanish and Portuguese fought the French using guerrilla tactics, defeating the French forces at the Battle of Bailén (June and July 1808). Britain sent a short-lived ground support force to Portugal, and French forces evacuated Portugal as defined in the Convention of Sintra following the Allied victory at Vimeiro (21 August 1808). France only controlled Catalonia and Navarre and could have been definitely expelled from the Iberian peninsula had the Spanish armies attacked again, but the Spanish did not.

Another French attack was launched on Spain, led by Napoleon himself, and was described as "an avalanche of fire and steel." However, the French Empire was no longer regarded as invincible by European powers. In 1808 Austria formed the Fifth Coalition in order to break down the French Empire. The Austrian Empire defeated the French at Aspern-Essling, yet was beaten at Wagram while the Polish allies defeated the Austrian Empire at Raszyn (April 1809). Although not as decisive as the previous Austrian defeats, the peace treaty in October 1809 stripped Austria of a large amount of territories, reducing it even more.

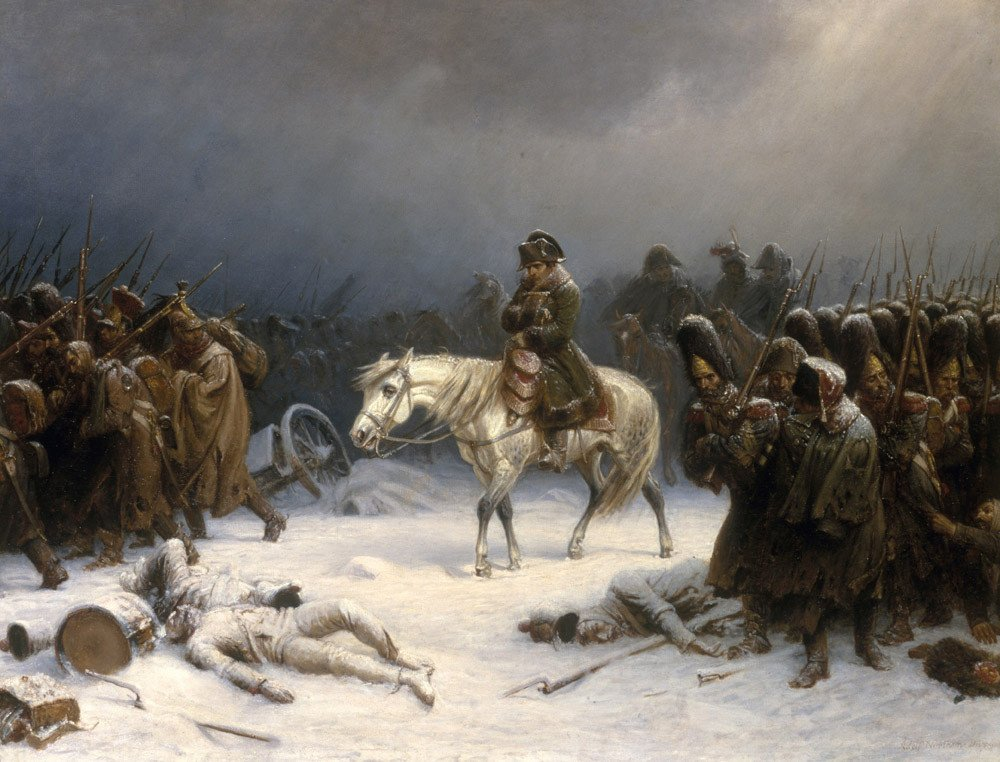
Napoleon Bonaparte retreating from Moscow, by Adolf Northern.

In 1812 Napoleon could no longer tolerate Russian independence. He assembled a gigantic army and invaded. The French invasion of Russia (1812) was a total disaster, caused primarily by weather, partisan attacks, disease and inadequate logistics. Only small remnants of the invading army returned from Russia. On the Spanish front the French armies were defeated and evacuated Spain.

Since France had been defeated on these two fronts, states it previously conquered and controlled struck back. The Sixth Coalition was formed, and the German states of the Confederation of the Rhine switched sides, finally opposing Napoleon. Napoleon was defeated in the Battle of the Nations outside Leipzig in October 1813. The Allies invaded France and Napoleon abdicated on 6 April 1814. The conservative Congress of Vienna reversed the political changes that had occurred during the wars. Napoleon's attempted restoration, a period known as the Hundred Days, ended with his final defeat at the Battle of Waterloo in 1815. The monarchy was restored with Louis XVIII as king, followed by his brother Charles X. France was soon integrated into the reactionary international situation. However much of the Napoleonic liberalization of Western Europe, including Italy, and Germany, and adjacent areas became permanent.

== France: 1815–1852 ==
France was no longer the dominant power it had been before 1815, but it did play a major role in European economics, culture, diplomacy and military affairs. The very conservative Bourbons were restored, but left a weak record and one branch was overthrown in 1830 and the other branch in 1848 as Napoleon's nephew was elected president. He made himself emperor as Napoleon III and followed an aggressive foreign policy.

France built up an overseas empire, especially in Africa and Indochina. The economy was strong, with a good railway system. The arrival of the Rothschild banking family of France in 1812 guaranteed the role of Paris alongside London as a major center of international finance.

== Overseas empire in the nineteenth century ==
Starting with its scattered smallholdings in India, West Indies, and Latin America, France began rebuilding its world empire. It took control of Algeria in 1830 and started to send in settlers. It began in earnest to rebuild its worldwide empire after 1850, concentrating chiefly in North and West Africa, as well as South-East Asia, with other conquests in Central and East Africa, as well as the South Pacific. Republicans, at first hostile to the empire, only became supportive when Germany started to build its own colonial empire in the 1880s. As it developed the new French empire expanded trade with France, especially supplying raw materials and purchasing manufactured items. The empire bestowed prestige on the motherland and spread French civilization and language, as well as the Catholic religion. It also provided manpower in the World Wars.

Paris took on a moral mission to lift the world up to French standards by bringing Christianity and French culture. In 1884 the leading exponent of colonialism, Jules Ferry declared; "The higher races have a right over the lower races, they have a duty to civilize the inferior races." Full citizenship rights – assimilation – was a long-term goal, but in practice, colonial officials were reluctant to extend full citizenship rights. France sent small numbers of white permanent settlers to its empire, in sharp contrast to Britain, Spain, and Portugal. The notable exception was Algeria, where the French settlers held power but remained a minority.

== Second Empire: 1852–1871 ==
Despite his promises in 1852 of a peaceful reign, Napoleon III could not resist the temptations of glory in foreign affairs such as his uncle, the world-famous Napoleon, had achieved. He was visionary, mysterious and secretive; he had a poor staff, and kept running afoul of his domestic supporters. In the end he was incompetent as a diplomat. Napoleon did have some successes: he strengthened French control over Algeria, established bases in Africa, began the takeover of Indochina, and opened trade with China. He facilitated a French company building the Suez Canal, which Britain could not stop.

In Europe, however, Napoleon III failed again and again. The Crimean War of 1854–1856 against Russia, in alliance with Britain and the Ottoman Empire, produced heavy losses and high expenses but no territorial or political gains. War with Austria in 1859 facilitated the unification of Italy, and Napoleon was rewarded with the annexation of Savoy and Nice. The British grew annoyed at his intervention in Syria in 1860–61. He angered Catholics alarmed at his poor treatment of the Pope, then reversed himself and angered the anticlerical liberals at home and his erstwhile Italian allies. He lowered the tariffs, which helped in the long run but in the short run angered owners of large estates and the textile and iron industrialists, while leading worried workers to organize.

Finally Napoleon was outmaneuvered by Prussian leader Otto von Bismarck and went to war with the Germans in 1870. Napoleon had alienated everyone; after failing to obtain an alliance with Austria and Italy, France had no allies and was bitterly divided at home. It was disastrously defeated on the battlefield, losing Alsace and Lorraine. A. J. P. Taylor is blunt: "he ruined France as a great power."

=== American Civil War and Mexico ===
France remained officially neutral throughout the War and never recognized the Confederate States of America. However, there were advantages to helping the Confederacy. France's textile factories needed cotton, and Napoleon III had imperial ambitions in Mexico which could be greatly aided by the Confederacy. The United States had warned that recognition of the Confederacy meant war. France was reluctant to act alone without British collaboration, and the British rejected intervention. Emperor Napoleon III realized that a war with the U.S. without allies "would spell disaster" for France. Napoleon III and his Minister of Foreign Affairs Edouard Thouvenel adopted a cautious attitude and maintained diplomatically correct relations with Washington. Half the French press favored the Union, while the "imperial" press was more sympathetic to the Confederacy. Public opinion generally ignored the war, but did show interest in controlling Mexico.

Napoleon hoped that a Confederate victory would result in two weak nations on Mexico's northern borders, allowing French dominance in a country ruled by its puppet Emperor Maximilian. Matías Romero, Júarez's ambassador to the United States, gained some support in Congress for possibly intervening on Mexico's behalf against France's occupation. However, Lincoln's Secretary of State William Seward was cautious in limiting US aid to Mexico. He did not want a war with France before the Confederacy was defeated.

Napoleon nearly blundered into war with the United States in 1862. His plan to take control of Mexico in 1861–1867 was a total disaster. The United States forced him to evacuate his army from Mexico, and his puppet Emperor was executed. In 1861, Mexican conservatives looked to Napoleon III to abolish the Republic led by liberal President Benito Juárez. France favored the Confederacy but did not accord it diplomatic recognition. The French expected that a Confederate victory would facilitate French economic dominance in Mexico. He helped the Confederacy by shipping urgently needed supplies through the ports of Matamoros, Mexico, and Brownsville (Texas). The Confederacy itself sought closer relationships with Mexico. Juarez turned it down, but the Confederates worked well with local warlords in northern Mexico, and with the French invaders.

Realizing that Washington could not intervene in Mexico as long as the Confederacy controlled Texas, France invaded Mexico in 1861 and installed an Austrian prince Maximilian I of Mexico as its puppet ruler in 1864. Owing to the shared convictions of the democratically elected government of Juárez and Lincoln, Matías Romero, Juárez's minister to Washington, mobilized support in the U.S. Congress, and raised money, soldiers and ammunition in the United States for the war against Maximilian. Washington repeatedly protested France's violation of the Monroe Doctrine.

Once the Union won the War in spring 1865, Washington allowed supporters of Juárez to openly purchase weapons and ammunition and issued stronger warnings to Paris. Washington sent General William Tecumseh Sherman with 50,000 combat veterans to the Mexican border to emphasize that time had run out on the French intervention. Napoleon III had no choice but to withdraw his outnumbered army in disgrace. Emperor Maximilian refused exile and was executed by the Mexican government in 1867.

Historians typically interpret the fiasco as a disaster for France. They portray an imperialistic attempt to secure access to raw materials and markets, and to establish a Latin, Catholic client state to prevent further American into Latin America. The failure stemmed from lack of realism in its conception, a gross underestimate of the power of the United States, a misunderstanding of Mexican public opinion, and recurring ineptitude in execution. While Maximilian and his widow get popular sympathy, Napoleon earns the sharp negative criticism of historians.

== Third Republic: 1871–1914 ==
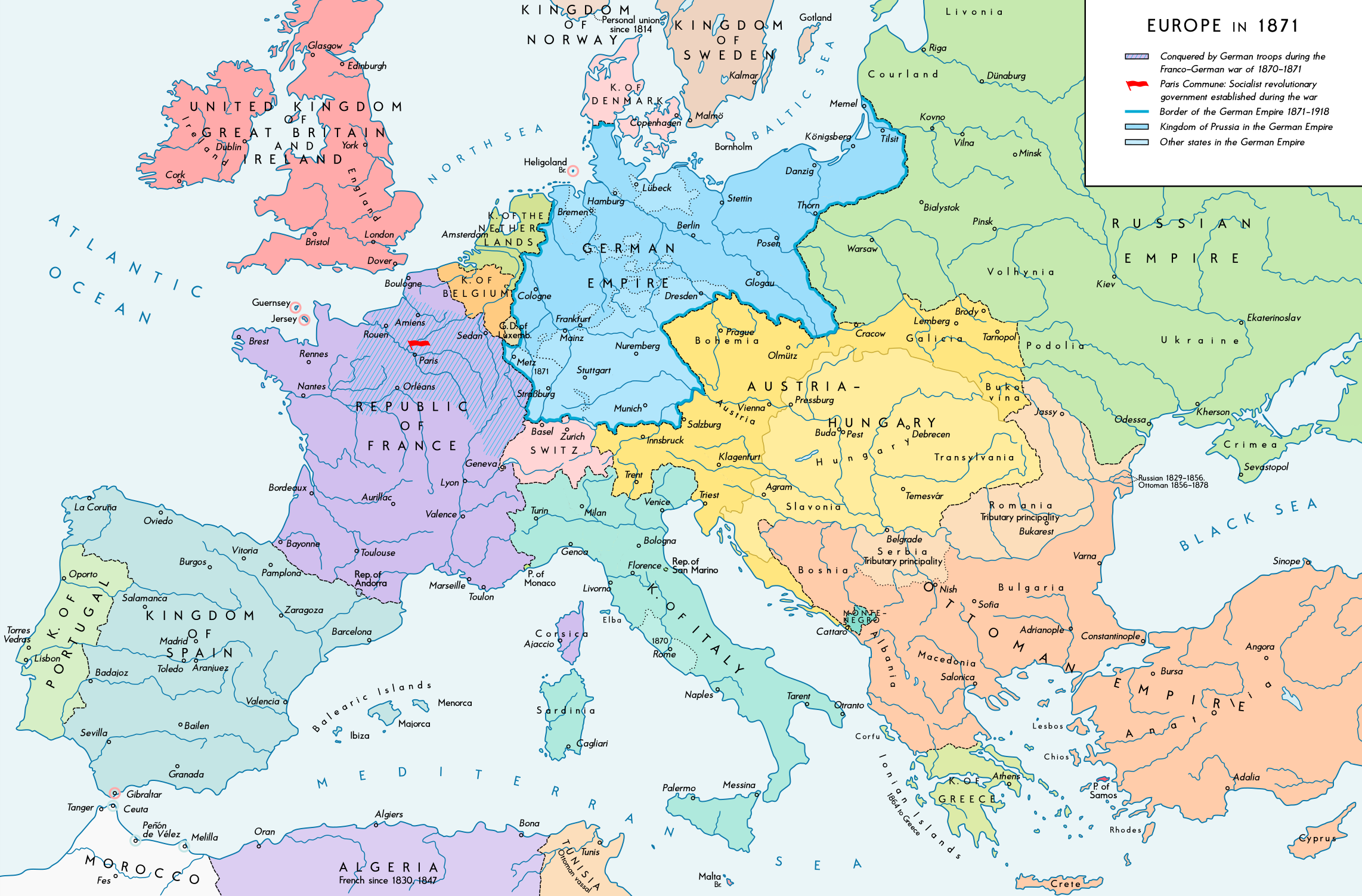
Europe after the Franco-Prussian War of 1871, the forming of the German Reich and the French loss of Alsace-Lorraine

French foreign policy was based on a hatred of Germany—whose larger size and faster-growing economy could not be matched—combined with a popular revanchism that demanded the return of Alsace and Lorraine. There were some moderate leaders who wanted to forget the past, but Berlin ignored their overtures.

According to M.B. Hayne, the French foreign office, known widely from its street address as Quai d'Orsay, was run by a highly professional diplomatic core group who controlled France's foreign policy in the two decades before 1914. Their decisive power resulted from clever exploitation of the preoccupation of the cabinet and parliament with internal politics; the rapid turnover of senior ministers, usually with minimal foreign-policy experience; and the growing expertise and self-assuredness of the bureaucrats. Hayne points out that they often defied official policies, withheld information from politicians they disdain, and used an outside network of influence from bankers, journalists, and French industry to promote their independent foreign policy.

Foreign affairs attracted far less attention than domestic affairs. Religious and class differences deeply divided the French people on polarities such as monarchy versus Republicanism, secularism versus Catholicism, farmers versus urbanites, workers versus owners. Permanent professional diplomats and bureaucrats had developed their own traditions of how to operate at the Quai d'Orsay (where the Foreign Ministry was located), and their style changed little from generation to generation. Most of the diplomats came from high status or aristocratic families. Although France was one of the few republics in Europe, its diplomats mingled smoothly with the aristocratic representatives at the royal courts. Prime ministers and leading politicians generally paid little attention to foreign affairs, allowing a handful of senior men to control policy. In the decades before the First World War they dominated the embassies in the 10 major countries where France had an ambassador (elsewhere, they set lower-ranking ministers). They included Théophile Delcassé, the foreign minister from 1898 to 1906; Paul Cambon, the ambassador in London, 1890–1920; Jean Jules Jusserand in Washington from 1902 to 1924; and Camille Barrere, in Rome from 1897 to 1924. In terms of foreign policy, there was general agreement about the need for high protective tariffs, which kept agricultural prices high. After the defeat by the Germans, there was a strong widespread anti-German sentiment focused on revanchism and regaining Alsace and Lorraine. The Empire was a matter of great pride, and service as administrators, soldiers and missionaries was a high status occupation.

Besides a demand for revenge against Germany, imperialism was a factor. In the midst of the Scramble for Africa, French and British interest in Africa came into conflict. The most dangerous episode was the Fashoda Incident of 1898 when French troops tried to claim an area in the Southern Sudan, and a British force purporting to be acting in the interests of the Khedive of Egypt arrived. Under heavy pressure the French withdrew securing Anglo-Egyptian control over the area. The status quo was recognised by an agreement between the two states acknowledging British control over Egypt, while France became the dominant power in Morocco, but France suffered a humiliating defeat overall.

=== Colonial empire in Africa and Asia ===
The Suez Canal, initially built by the French, became a joint British-French project in 1875, as both saw it as vital to maintaining their influence and empires in Asia. In 1882, ongoing civil disturbances in Egypt prompted Britain to intervene, extending a hand to France. The government allowed Britain to take effective control of Egypt.

Under the leadership of expansionist Jules Ferry, the Third Republic greatly expanded the French colonial empire. Catholic missionaries played a major role. France acquired Indochina, Madagascar, vast territories in West Africa and Central Africa, and much of Polynesia.

In the early 1880s, Pierre Savorgnan de Brazza was exploring the Kongo Kingdom for France, at the same time Henry Morton Stanley explored it in on behalf of Leopold II of Belgium, who would have it as his personal Congo Free State (see section below). France occupied Tunisia in May 1881. In 1884, France occupied Guinea. French West Africa (AOF) was founded in 1895, and French Equatorial Africa in 1910.

During the Scramble for Africa in the 1870s and 1880s, the British and French generally recognised each other's spheres of influence. The Suez Canal, initially built by the French, became a joint British-French project in 1875, as both saw it as vital to maintaining their influence and empires in Asia. In 1882, ongoing civil disturbances in Egypt (see Urabi Revolt) prompted Britain to intervene, extending a hand to France. France's expansionist Prime Minister Jules Ferry was out of office, and the government was unwilling to send more than an intimidatory fleet to the region. Britain established a protectorate, as France had a year earlier in Tunisia, and popular opinion in France later put this action down to duplicity. It was about this time that the two nations established co-ownership of Vanuatu. The Anglo-French Convention of 1882 was also signed to resolve territory disagreements in western Africa.

==== Fashoda crisis with Britain in 1898 ====
In the 1875–1898 era, serious tensions with the other great colonial power Britain erupted over African territory. At several points war was possible, but it never happened. One brief but dangerous dispute occurred during the Fashoda Incident of 1898 when French troops tried to claim an area in the Southern Sudan, and a more powerful British military force purporting to be acting in the interests of the Khedive of Egypt arrived. Under heavy pressure the French withdrew, thereby permitting Anglo-Egyptian control over the area south of Egypt. The status quo was recognised by an agreement acknowledging British control over Egypt, while France became the dominant power in Morocco. France had failed in its main goals. P.M.H. Bell says, "Between the two governments there was a brief battle of wills, with the British insisting on immediate and unconditional French withdrawal from Fashoda. The French had to accept these terms, amounting to a public humiliation....Fashoda was long remembered in France as an example of British brutality and injustice."

==== Asia ====
France had colonies in Asia and looked for alliances and found in Japan a possible ally. At Japan's request Paris sent military missions in 1872–1880, in 1884–1889 and in 1918–1919 to help modernize the Japanese army. Conflicts with China over Indochina climaxed during the Sino-French War (1884–1885). Admiral Courbet destroyed the Chinese fleet anchored at Foochow. The treaty ending the war, put France in a protectorate over northern and central Vietnam, which it divided into Tonkin and Annam.

=== Franco-Russian Alliance ===
France was deeply split between the monarchists on one side, and the Republicans on the other. The monarchists were comfortable with the tsar, but the Republicans deeply distrusted Russia. It was poor and not industrialized; it was intensely religious and authoritarian, with no sense of democracy or freedom for its peoples. It oppressed Poland. It exiled, and even executed political liberals and radicals. At a time when French Republicans were rallying in the Dreyfus affair against anti-Semitism in France, Russia was the most notorious center in the world of anti-Semitic outrages. On the other hand, Republicans and monarchists alike were increasingly frustrated by Bismarck's success in isolating France diplomatically. Paris made a few overtures to Berlin, but they were rebuffed, and after 1900 there was a threat of war between France and Germany over Germany's attempt to deny French expansion into Morocco. Great Britain was still in its "splendid isolation" mode and after a major agreement in 1890 with Germany, it seemed especially favorable toward Berlin. Colonial conflicts in Africa were troubling. The Fashoda crisis of 1898 brought Britain and France almost to the brink of war and ended with a humiliation of France that left it hostile to Britain. By 1892 Russia was the only opportunity for France to break out of its diplomatic isolation. Russia had been allied with Germany the new Kaiser Wilhelm removed Bismarck in 1890 and disrupted the established system. Thus in 1892 ended the "Reinsurance treaty" with Russia. Russia was now alone diplomatically and like France, it needed a military alliance to contain the threat of Germany's strong army and military aggressiveness. The pope, angered by German anti-Catholicism, worked diplomatically to bring Paris and St. Petersburg together. Russia desperately needed money for our infrastructure of railways and ports facilities. The German government refused to allow its banks to lend money to Russia, but French banks eagerly did so. For example, it funded the essential trans-Siberian railway. Negotiations were increasingly successful, and by 1895. France and Russia had signed the Franco-Russian Alliance, a strong military alliance to join together in war if Germany attacked either of them. France had finally escaped its diplomatic isolation.

== 1900–1914 ==
Diplomatic alignments in 1900–1914; Italy was neutral, then joined the Allies in 1915.

After Bismarck's removal from office in 1890, French efforts to isolate Germany finally succeeded. With the formation of the Triple Entente, Germany began to feel encircled. French foreign minister Théophile Delcassé, especially, went to great pains to woo Russia and Great Britain. Key markers were the Franco-Russian Alliance of 1894, the 1904 Entente Cordiale with Great Britain, and finally the Anglo-Russian Entente in 1907 which became the Triple Entente. This formal alliance with Russia, and informal alignment with Britain, against Germany and Austria eventually led Russia and Britain to enter World War I as France's main allies.

By 1914 French foreign policy was thus based on its formal alliance with Russia, and an informal understanding with Britain, all based on the assumption that the main threat was from Germany. The crisis of 1914 was unexpected, and when Germany mobilized its forces in response to Russian mobilization, France also had to mobilize or be overwhelmed by sheer numbers. Germany then invaded Belgium and France, and World War I had begun.

== First World War ==
Germany declared war on France on 3 August 1914 and invaded Belgium and northeastern France following its Schlieffen Plan. The plan seemed to promise quick victory but it failed because of inadequate forces, unexpected Belgian resistance, and poor coordination among German generals. France had already launched its invasion of Germany with Plan XVII, but very quickly realized it needed to defend Paris at all costs. It did so at the First Battle of the Marne (5–12 September); the German armies were defeated and forced back. The war became stalemated on the Western Front, with practically no movement until spring 1918. Both sides suffered very high casualties caused by repeated infantry attacks against defensive positions protected by trenches, barbed wire, machine guns, and heavy artillery using aircraft as spotters, and poison gas. Meanwhile, the rich industrial and mining regions of Belgium and northeastern France remained in German hands throughout the war. Marshals Joseph Joffre (1852–1931) and Douglas Haig (1861–1928) believed that attrition would win the war by wearing down the German reserves in multiple massive assaults. German general Erich von Falkenhayn (1861–1922) was outnumbered and focused on defense. Both sides failed to realize the stultifying effect of trench warfare on morale and the loss of hundreds of thousands of lives in futile attempts to win a "decisive battle."

After Socialist leader Jean Jaurès, a pacifist, was assassinated at the start of the war, the French socialist movement abandoned its antimilitarist positions and joined the national war effort. The labor unions supported the war. Prime Minister Rene Viviani called for unity—for a "Union sacrée" ("Sacred Union")—which was a wartime truce between the right and left factions that had been fighting bitterly. France had few dissenters. However, war-weariness was a major factor by 1917, even reaching the army.

The French Right supported the war, emphasizing the deep spiritual value of "the Union Sacrée." The middle-of-the-road Radicals split—one wing wanted a compromise peace. By winter 1916–17 strong annexationist demands emerged on the right, calling for annexation of Germany's Saar basin to France and the creation of independent German states on the left bank of the Rhine.

In 1914 London and Paris agreed that financially Britain would support the weaker Allies and that France would take care of itself. There was no common financial policy. French credit collapsed in 1916 and Britain took full control of the failing Allied finances and began loaning large sums to Paris. The J. P. Morgan bank in New York assumed control of French loans in the fall of 1916 and relinquished it to the US government when the U.S. entered the war in 1917.

In 1917 the Russian Revolution ended the Franco-Russian alliance, and French policy changed. It joined Britain sending forces against the Bolsheviks and in support of the "white" counter-revolutionaries. Paris gave active support to the Southern Slav unionist movement and to the Czech and Polish claims for independence. Serbia was a loyal ally of France throughout World War I. Serbia was highly appreciative of French financial and material aid before its collapse in 1915 as well as funding the Serbian government in exile. There was popular support in France for Serbia as seen in taking in refugees and educating students. France took part in the armed liberation of Serbia, Montenegro, and Vojvodina in 1918.

=== Paris Peace conference 1919 ===
France suffered very heavy losses in the war, in terms of battle casualties and economic distress, but came out on the winning side. It demanded Germany make good all its financial losses (including pensions for the veterans.) At the Paris peace conference of 1919, vengeance against defeated Germany was the main French theme, and Prime Minister Clemenceau was largely effective against the moderating influences of the British and Americans. The Treaty of Versailles was forced upon Germany which deeply resented the harsh terms. France strongly supported the new Kingdom of the Serbs, Croats, and Slovenes. It became Yugoslavia and in the 1920s and 1930s helped France by opposing German ambitions in the Balkans.

== Interwar years ==
French foreign and security policy after 1919 used traditional alliance strategies to weaken German's potential to threaten France and comply with the strict obligations devised by France in the Treaty of Versailles. The main diplomatic strategy came in response to the demands of the French army to form alliances against the German threat. Germany resisted then finally complied, aided by American money, and France took a more conciliatory policy by 1924 in response to pressure from Britain and the United States, as well as to French realization that its potential allies in Eastern Europe were weak and hard to coordinate. It proved impossible to establish military alliances with the United States or Britain. A tentative Russian agreement in 1935 was politically suspect and was not implemented. The alliances with Poland and Czechoslovakia; these proved to be weak ties that collapsed in the face of German threats in 1938 in 1939.

=== 1920s ===
France was part of the Allied force that occupied the Rhineland following the Armistice. Foch supported Poland in the Greater Poland Uprising and in the Polish–Soviet War and France also joined Spain during the Rif War. From 1925 until his death in 1932, Aristide Briand, as prime minister during five short intervals, directed French foreign policy, using his diplomatic skills and sense of timing to forge friendly relations with Weimar Germany as the basis of a genuine peace within the framework of the League of Nations. He realized France could neither contain the much larger Germany by itself nor secure effective support from Britain or the League.

In January 1923, as a response to the failure of Germany to ship enough coal as part of its World War I reparations, France (and Belgium) occupied the industrial region of the Ruhr. Germany responded with a policy of passive resistance and supported the idled workers by printing additional money, spurring the onset of hyperinflation. Inflation heavily damaged the German middle class (whose savings became worthless) and also the French franc. France fomented a separatist movement pointing to an independent buffer state, but it collapsed after some bloodshed. The intervention was a failure, and in summer 1924 France accepted the solution to the reparations issues, as expressed in the Dawes Plan, an international effort chaired by the American banker Charles G. Dawes. It set up a staggered schedule for Germany's payment of war reparations, provided for a large loan to stabilize the German currency and ended the occupation of the Ruhr. Germany was then able to meet its reparations payments under the new schedule. The United States demanded repayment of the war loans, although the terms were slightly softened in 1926. All the loans, payments and reparations were suspended in 1931, and all were finally resolved in 1951.

The Locarno Treaties of 1925 helped bring Germany back into the French good graces. It guaranteed the border between France and Germany, but ignored Germany's controversial eastern border. In Poland, the public humiliation received by Polish diplomats was one of the contributing factors to the fall of the Grabski cabinet. Locarno contributed to the worsening of the atmosphere between Poland and France, weakening the French-Polish alliance. Józef Beck ridiculed the treaties saying, "Germany was officially asked to attack the east, in return for peace in the west."

In the 1920s, France built the Maginot Line, an elaborate system of static border defences, designed to fight off any German attack. The Maginot Line did not extend into Belgium, where Germany attacked in 1940 and went around the French defenses. Military alliances were signed with weak powers in 1920–21, called the "Little Entente".

=== 1930s ===
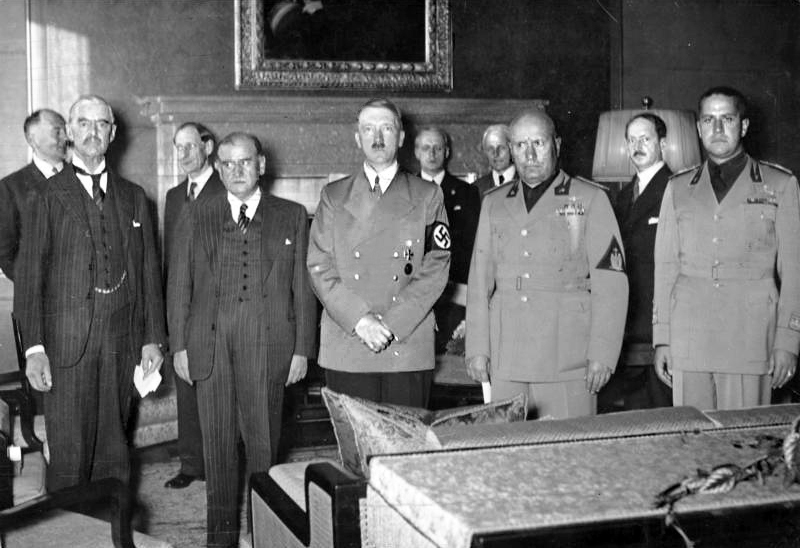
In 1938 France betrayed Czechoslovakia and signed Munich Agreement with Nazi Germany effectively dishonoring French-Czechoslovak alliance.

British historian Richard Overy explains how the country that had dominated Europe for three centuries wanted one last extension of power, but failed in its resolve:

In the 1930s France became a deeply conservative, defensive society, split by social conflict, undermined by failing and un-modernized economy and an empire in crisis. All these things explain the loss of will and direction in the 1930s.

The foreign policy of right-wing Pierre Laval (prime minister and foreign minister 1934–1936) was based on a deep distrust of Nazi Germany. He sought anti-German alliances. He and Mussolini signed the Franco-Italian Agreement in January 1935. The agreement ceded parts of French Somaliland to Italy and allowed her a free hand in Abyssinia, in exchange for support against any German aggression. In April 1935, Laval persuaded Italy and Great Britain to join France in the Stresa Front against German ambitions in Austria. On 2 May 1935, he likewise signed the Franco-Soviet Treaty of Mutual Assistance, but it was not implemented by Laval nor by his left-wing successors.

Appeasement was increasingly adopted as Germany grew stronger, for France was increasingly weakened by a stagnant economy, unrest in its colonies, and bitter internal political fighting. Appeasement was the fall-back position when it was impossible to make a major decision. Martin Thomas says it was not a coherent diplomatic strategy nor a copying of the British. When Hitler in 1936 sent troops into the Rhineland—the part of Germany where no troops were allowed—neither Paris nor London would risk war, and nothing was done. France also appeased Italy on the Ethiopia question because it could not afford to risk an alliance between Italy and Germany.

Hitler's remilitarization of the Rhineland changed the balance of power decisively in favor of the Reich. French credibility in standing against German expansion or aggression was left in doubt. French military strategy was entirely defensive, and it had no intention whatever of invading Germany if war broke out. Instead it planned to defend the Maginot Line. Its failure to send even a single unit into Rhineland signaled that strategy to all of Europe. Potential allies in Eastern Europe could no longer trust in an alliance with a France that could not be trusted to deter Germany through threat of an invasion. Without such deterrence, the ally was militarily helpless. Belgium dropped its defensive alliance with France and relied on neutrality. Paris neglected to expand the Maginot line to cover the Belgian border, which is where Germany invaded in 1940. Mussolini had previously pushed back against German expansion, now he realized cooperation with France was unpromising, so he began instead to swing in favor of Berlin. All of France's friends were disappointed – even the Pope told the French ambassador that, "Had you ordered the immediate advance of 200,000 men into the zone the Germans had occupied, you would have done everyone a very great favor."

Appeasement in union with Britain now became the main policy after 1936, as France sought peace in the face of Hitler's escalating demands. Édouard Daladier, prime minister 1938–40, refused to go to war against Germany and Italy without British support. He endorsed Neville Chamberlain who wanted to save peace using the Munich Agreement in 1938. France's military alliance with Czechoslovakia was sacrificed at Hitler's demand when France and Britain agreed to his terms at Munich in 1938.

The left-wing Léon Blum government in 1936–37 joined the right-wing Britain government in establishing an arms embargo during the Spanish Civil War (1936–39). Blum rejected support for the Spanish Republicans because of his fear that civil war might spread to deeply divided France. As the Republican cause faltered in Spain, Blum secretly supplied the Republican cause with warplanes, money and sanctuaries. The government nationalized arms suppliers, and dramatically increased its program of rearming the French military in a last-minute catch up with the Germans. It also tried to build up the weak Polish army.

French foreign policy in the 1920s and 1930s aimed to build military alliances with small nations in Eastern Europe in order to counter the threat of German attacks. Paris saw Romania as an ideal partner in this venture, especially in 1926 to 1939. During World War II the alliance failed. Romania was first neutral and then after Germany defeated France in 1940 it aligned with Germany. The main device France had used was arms sales in order to strengthen Romania and ensure its goodwill. French military promises were vague and not trusted after the sellout of Czechoslovakia at Munich in 1938. By 1938 France needed all the arms it could produce. Meanwhile, Germany was better poised to build strong economic ties. In 1938-39 France made a final effort to guarantee Romanian borders because it calculated that Germany needed Romanian oil, but Romania decided war with Germany would be hopeless and so it veered toward Berlin.

== Second World War ==
=== Entry into war ===
In 1938 Germany demanded control of the German-speaking Sudetenland region of Czechoslovakia. That small country had a defense alliance with France but militarily its position was hopeless. The Munich conference of September 29–30, 1938, was a summit meeting of leaders from Germany, Italy, Britain and France. The Soviet Union and Czechoslovakia were not invited. The British and French wanted peace—or at least enough delay to allow them to try to catch up to German military superiority. Britain did not control French actions, but London had more influence on Paris than vice versa. The leading French voice for cooperating with British Prime Chamberlain in appeasement was foreign minister Georges Bonnet. He was a "munichois"—that is, a defeatist and pacifist who sensed that France would lose to Germany in a war. He wanted to abandon the alliances with Poland and Russia and allow Germany a free hand in the east so it would ignore France. After a short conference Hitler got his way—the agreement allowed Germany to peacefully absorb the Sudetenland. In March, 1939, Germany took over Bohemia and Moravia, and turned Slovakia into a puppet state. The British and French finally realized that appeasement did not produce peace.

In spring 1939 Hitler demanded concessions from Poland and this time Britain and France announced they would go to war to defend the integrity of Poland. Efforts to bring the USSR into the coalition failed and instead it formed an agreement with Hitler to divide up Poland and Eastern Europe. Hitler did not believe the Allies would fight in such a faraway hopeless cause, and he invaded Poland on September 1, 1939. Britain and France declared war on September 3, 1939. But there was little they could or did do to help Poland.

=== German conquest 1940 ===
France and Britain together declared war against Germany two days after it invaded Poland. The British and French empires joined the war but no one else. Britain and France took a defensive posture, fearing German air attacks on cities. France hoped the Maginot Line would protect it from an invasion. There was little fighting between the fall of Poland in mid-September and the following spring; it was the Phoney War in Britain or Drôle de guerre – "the funny sort of war" – in France. Britain tried several peace feelers, but Hitler did not respond.

In spring 1940 Germany launched its Blitzkrieg against Denmark and Norway, easily pushing the British out. Then it invaded the Low Countries and tricked Britain and France into sending their best combat units deep into the Netherlands, where they became trapped in the Battle of France in May 1940. The Royal Navy rescued over 300,000 British and French soldiers from Dunkirk, but left behind all the equipment.

Paris fell to the Germans on 14 June 1940, and the government surrendered on 24 June 1940. Nazi Germany occupied three-fifths of France's territory, leaving the rest in the southeast to the new Vichy government, which was a bit more than a puppet state since it still had a navy. However nearly 2 million French soldiers became prisoners of war in Germany. They served as hostages and forced laborers in German factories. The United States suddenly realized Germany was on the verge of controlling practically all of Europe, and it determined to rapidly build up its small Army and Air Force, and expand its Navy. Sympathy with Britain was high, and many were willing to send munitions, but few Americans called for war.

=== Vichy France ===
The fall of France in June 1940 brought a new regime known as Vichy France. Theoretically it was neutral, but in practice it was partly controlled by Germany until November 1942, when Germany took full control. Vichy was intensely conservative and anti-Communist, but it was practically helpless with Germany controlling half of France directly and holding nearly two million French POWs as hostages. Vichy finally collapsed when the Germans fled in summer 1944.

The United States granted Vichy full diplomatic recognition, sending Admiral William D. Leahy to Paris as American ambassador. President Roosevelt hoped to use American influence to encourage those elements in the Vichy government opposed to military collaboration with Germany. Vichy still controlled its overseas colonies and Washington encouraged Vichy to resist German demands such as for air bases in Syria or to move war supplies through French North Africa. The essential American position was that France should take no action not explicitly required by the armistice terms that could adversely affect Allied efforts in the war. When Germany took full control the U.S. and Canada cut their ties.

==== French fleet ====
Britain feared that the French naval fleet could end up in German hands and be used against its own naval forces, which were so vital to maintaining north Atlantic shipping and communications. Under the armistice, France had been allowed to retain the French Navy, the Marine Nationale, under strict conditions. Vichy pledged that the fleet would never fall into the hands of Germany, but refused to send the fleet beyond Germany's reach by sending it to Britain or to far away territories of the French empire such as the West Indies. Shortly after France gave up it attacked a large French naval contingent in Mers-el-Kebir, killing 1,297 French military personnel. Vichy severed diplomatic relations but did not declare war on Britain. Churchill also ordered French ships in British ports to be seized by the Royal Navy. The French squadron at Alexandria, Egypt, under Admiral René-Emile Godfroy, was effectively interned until 1943.

The American position towards Vichy France and Free France was inconsistent. President Roosevelt disliked and distrusted de Gaulle, and agreed with Ambassador Leahy's view that he was an "apprentice dictator."

==== North Africa ====
Preparing for a landing in North Africa in late 1942, the US looked for a top French ally. It turned to Henri Giraud shortly before the landing on 8 November 1942, but he had little local support. By hapstance the Vichy leader Admiral François Darlan was captured and supported the Americans. The Allies, with General Dwight D. Eisenhower in charge, signed a deal with Admiral Darlan on 22 November 1942 in which the Allies recognized Darlan as high commissioner for North Africa and West Africa. The Allied world was stunned at giving a high command to a man who days before had been collaborating with the Nazis; Roosevelt and Churchill supported Eisenhower, for he was following a plan that had been worked out in London and had been approved by Roosevelt and Churchill. Darlan was assassinated on 24 December 1942, so Washington turned again towards Giraud, who was made High Commissioner of French North and West Africa. Giraud failed to build a political base and was displaced by the last man with any standing, de Gaulle.

=== Free France ===
Free France was the insurgent French government based in London and the overseas French colonies and led by charismatic general Charles de Gaulle. He was the most senior French military officer to reject the June 1940 surrender ("Armistice") and oppose the Vichy government of Marshall Pétain. From London on 18 June 1940 he gave an impassioned radio address exhorting the patriotic French people to resist Nazi Germany He organized the Free French Forces from soldiers that had escaped with the British at Dunkirk. With British military support the Free French gradually gained control of all French colonies except Indochina, which the Japanese controlled. The U.S., Britain and Canada wanted Vichy to keep nominal control of the small islands of St. Pierre and Miquelon for reasons of prestige, but de Gaulle seized them anyway in late 1941.

De Gaulle headed a government in exile based in London, but he continued to create diplomatic problems for the U.S. and Britain. When the British and Americans landed in France in June 1944, he refused to allow French soldiers to land on D-Day. He insisted that France be treated as a great power by the other Allies, and that he himself was the only representative of France. Roosevelt disliked him, but he had Churchill's support. The U.S. and Britain allowed de Gaulle the honor of being the first to march into Paris at the head of his army after the Germans had fled.

Communists played a major role in the French resistance, and the USSR was leading the fight against Germany, so De Gaulle emphasized that Free France supported the USSR. Relations cooled in fall 1943 to summer 1944, then warmed up again and de Gaulle visited Moscow. He made concessions to Stalin to obtain Soviet support against Anglo-Saxon dominance. There was a hope of making France a bridge between the Soviets and the Anglo-Americans. None of the Big Three wanted to pretend that France was a power again, so it was not invited to the decisive Yalta conference in February 1945, which was humiliating. Furthermore, Communist efforts to seize power in Poland Europe, as directed by Stalin, were worrisome to the French. With Roosevelt replaced by Harry Truman, De Gaulle increasingly turned to the American presence to maintain balance of power.

== Fourth Republic: 1944–1958 ==
The Popular Republican Movement (MRP), a large moderate party based on the Catholic vote, dominated French foreign and colonial policies during most of the later 1940s and 1950s. Along with the French Socialist Party, it was the most energetic supporter in the country of European integration. It was also a strong backer of NATO and of close alliance with the United States, making it the most "Atlanticist" of French political parties. Its leaders, especially Georges Bidault and Paul Coste-Floret (foreign and colonial ministers respectively in several French coalition governments) were primary architects of France's hard-line colonial policies that culminated in long insurgencies in Vietnam (1946–1954) and Algeria (1954–1962), as well as a series of smaller insurrections and political crises elsewhere in the French Empire. The MRP eventually divided over the Algerian question in the late 1950s (with Bidault being an avid supporter of the OAS).

France was bitter when the United States and Britain refused to share atomic secrets with it. The upshot was France developed its own nuclear weapons and delivery systems. However Britain did ensure that France was included in the split of conquered Germany into Soviet, British, American and French zones. Following Soviet refusals to participate in a German rebuilding effort set forth by western European countries in 1948, the US, Britain and France spearheaded the establishment of West Germany from the three Western zones of occupation in April 1949.

The Cold War began in 1947, as Britain and the United States started providing aid to Greece and Turkey, in order to prevent a Communist takeover. Despite its large pro-Soviet Communist Party, France joined the Allies. The first move was the Franco-British alliance realized in the Dunkirk Treaty in March 1947.

The Marshall Plan (officially the European Recovery Program, ERP) was the American initiative 1948–1951 to aid Europe, in which the United States gave away $17 billion (approximately $160 billion in current dollar value) in economic support to help rebuild European economies and foster European unity in the face of Soviet threats. France received $2.3 billion about 18% of the Marshall total. This allowed France to make heavy purchases of food and machinery from the United States. Counting other programs, the U.S. government in total gave France $4.7 billion in grants from 1945 through 1951. There was no requirement for repayment. The Marshall Plan required a lessening of interstate barriers, a dropping of many petty regulations constraining business (such as a limit on Hollywood films), and encouraged increased productivity, labour Union membership, and the adoption of modern business procedures.

France, the United States, Britain, Canada and eight other western European countries signed the North Atlantic Treaty in April 1949, establishing the North Atlantic Treaty Organization (NATO).

=== Indochina War (1946–1954) ===
The First Indochina War (generally known as the Indochina War in France) began in French Indochina on 19 December 1946 and lasted until 1 August 1954. Fighting between French forces and their Communist opponents known as the Việt Minh began in September 1945. The conflict pitted a range of forces, including the French Union's French Far East Expeditionary Corps, led by France and supported by Emperor Bảo Đại's Vietnamese National Army against the Việt Minh, led by Ho Chi Minh and Võ Nguyên Giáp. Most of the fighting took place in Tonkin in Northern Vietnam, along with Chinese border. The conflict eventually reached most of Vietnam and also extended into the neighboring French Indochina protectorates of Laos and Cambodia.

After the Japanese surrendered, Chinese forces in September 1945 entered Tonkin and a small British task force landed at Saigon. The Chinese accepted the Vietnamese government under Ho Chi Minh, created by resistance forces of the Việt Minh, then in power in Hanoi. The British refused to do likewise in Saigon, and deferred to the French there from the outset, against the ostensible support of the Việt Minh by American OSS representatives. On V-J Day, September 2, Ho Chi Minh, had proclaimed in Hanoi the establishment of the Democratic Republic of Vietnam (DRV). The DRV ruled as the only civil government in all of Vietnam for a period of about 20 days, after the abdication of the "Japanese puppet", Emperor Bảo Đại. On 23 September 1945, French forces overthrew the local DRV government, and declared French authority restored in Cochinchina. Guerrilla warfare began around Saigon immediately.

The first few years of the war involved a low-level rural insurgency against French authority. However, after the Chinese communists reached the Northern border of Vietnam in 1949, the conflict turned into a conventional war between two armies equipped with modern weapons supplied by the United States and the Soviet Union. French Union forces included colonial troops from the whole empire (Moroccan, Algerian, Tunisian, Laotian, Cambodian, and Vietnamese ethnic minorities), French professional troops and units of the French Foreign Legion. The use of metropolitan recruits was forbidden by the government to prevent the war from becoming even more unpopular at home. It was called the "dirty war" (la sale guerre) by the Left in France.

While the strategy of pushing the Việt Minh into attacking a well-defended base in a remote part of the country at the end of their logistical trail was validated at the Battle of Nà Sản, the lack of construction materials (especially concrete), tanks (because of lack of road access and difficulty in the jungle terrain), and air cover precluded an effective defense, culminating in a decisive French defeat at the Battle of Dien Bien Phu.

At the international Geneva Conference on July 21, 1954 the new socialist French government and the Việt Minh made an agreement that was denounced by the government of Vietnam and by the United States, but which effectively gave the Communists control of North Vietnam above the 17th parallel. South Vietnam, with heavy American support, continued under Emperor Bảo Đại. In 1955 Bảo Đại would be deposed by his prime minister, Ngô Đình Diệm, creating the Republic of Vietnam. Soon an insurgency backed by the North developed against Diệm's government. The conflict gradually escalated into the Vietnam War.

Pierre Mendès France was a Radical party leader and the Prime Minister for eight months in 1954–55, working with the support of the Socialist and Communist parties. His top priority was ending the war in Indochina, which had already cost 92,000 dead 114,000 wounded and 28,000 captured. Public opinion polls show that in February 1954, only 7% of the French people wanted to continue the fight to keep Indochina out of the hands of the Communists, led by Ho Chi Minh and his Việt Minh movement. At the Geneva Conference (1954) he made a deal that gave the Việt Minh control of Vietnam north of the seventeenth parallel, and allowed him to pull out all French forces. That left South Vietnam standing alone. However, the United States moved in and provided large scale financial military and economic support for South Vietnam. Mendès France next came to an agreement with Habib Bourguiba, the nationalist leader in Tunisia, for the independence of that colony by 1956, and began discussions with the nationalist leaders in Morocco for a French withdrawal.

=== European unification begins ===
French fears of a resurgent Germany made it reluctant to support the plan to merge the British and American zones of occupation. However growing fear of the Soviets, and the need for American economic assistance led the French to merge their zone into what became West Germany.

The creation of the European Coal and Steel Community (ECSC) was first proposed by French foreign minister Robert Schuman and French economic theorist Jean Monnet on 9 May 1950 as a way to prevent further war between France and Germany.

Though Britain was invited, its Labour government, then preparing for a re-election fight, did not join the initiative. ECSC was formally established in 1951 by the Treaty of Paris, signed by France, Italy, West Germany and the three Benelux states: Belgium, Luxembourg and the Netherlands. Among these states the ECSC would remove trade barriers and create a common market for coal and steel. The ECSC was governed by a 'High Authority', checked by bodies representing governments, Members of Parliament and an independent judiciary.

== Fifth Republic (1958 to 1981) ==
=== President de Gaulle, 1958–1969 ===
The May 1958 seizure of power in Algiers by French army units and French settlers opposed to concessions in the face of Arab nationalist insurrection ripped apart the unstable Fourth Republic. The National Assembly brought him back to power during the May 1958 crisis. De Gaulle founded the Fifth Republic with a strengthened presidency, and he was elected in the latter role. He managed to keep France together while taking steps to end the war, much to the anger of the Pieds-Noirs (Frenchmen settled in Algeria) and the military; both previously had supported his return to power to maintain colonial rule. He granted independence to Algeria in 1962 and progressively to other French colonies.

Proclaiming that grandeur was the essential to the nature of France, de Gaulle initiated his "Politics of Grandeur". He demanded complete autonomy for France in world affairs, which meant that it has its major decisions which could not be forced upon it by NATO, the European Community or anyone else. De Gaulle pursued a policy of "national independence." He twice vetoed Britain's entry into the Common Market, fearing it might overshadow France in European affairs. While not officially abandoning NATO, he withdraw from its military integrated command, fearing that the United States had too much control over NATO. He launched an independent nuclear development program that made France the fourth nuclear power.

He restored cordial Franco-German relations in order to create a European counterweight between the "Anglo-Saxon" (American and British) and Soviet spheres of influence. De Gaulle openly criticised the U.S. intervention in Vietnam. He was angry at American economic power, especially what his Finance minister called the "exorbitant privilege" of the U.S. dollar. He went to Canada and proclaimed "Vive le Québec libre", the catchphrase for an independent Quebec.

De Gaulle resigned in 1969 after losing a referendum in which he proposed more decentralization.

=== President Georges Pompidou, 1969–1974 ===
As president, Georges Pompidou had full charge of foreign-policy, largely ignoring his premier Jacques Chaban-Delmas and relying instead on his aide Maurice Schumann. Pompidou tried to closely follow de Gaulle's policies, but he totally lacked the General's charisma, innovation and ability to startled friends and enemies alike. He lacked experience and a smooth hand, and for the first two years most of his initiatives proved failures. Fortunately for his domestic popularity, the French people paid little attention to foreign affairs. In terms of Mediterranean policy, he made an effort to foster closer relations with North African and Middle Eastern countries in order to develop a hinterland including all nations bordering the Mediterranean. However, de Gaulle had favored the Arab cause against the Israelis, especially in the Six-Day War in 1967 in which Israel, under attack from all directions, decisively defeated all its Arab neighbors. Pompidou continued the hostility, and tried to come to terms with Morocco as well. He tried to sell French weapons to Colonel Qaddafi, the reckless dictator of Libya. An outburst of international hostility scuttled that adventure. His greatest disaster came in Algeria, which doubled its taxes on French-owned oilfields, and finally nationalized them in 1971. Pompidou watched helplessly.

The United States was eager to restore positive relations with France after de Gaulle's departure from office. New US President Richard Nixon and his top adviser Henry Kissinger admired Pompidou; the politicians were in agreement on most major policy issues. The United States offered to help the French nuclear programme. Economic difficulties, however, arose following the Nixon Shock and the 1973–75 recession, particularly over the role of the American dollar as the medium for world trade.

Pompidou did well in fostering helpful guidance with the newly independent former French colonies in Africa. In 1971, he visited Mauritania, Senegal, Ivory Coast, Cameroons, and Gabon. He brought a message of cooperation and financial assistance, but without the traditional paternalism.

=== President Valéry Giscard d'Estaing, 1974–1981 ===
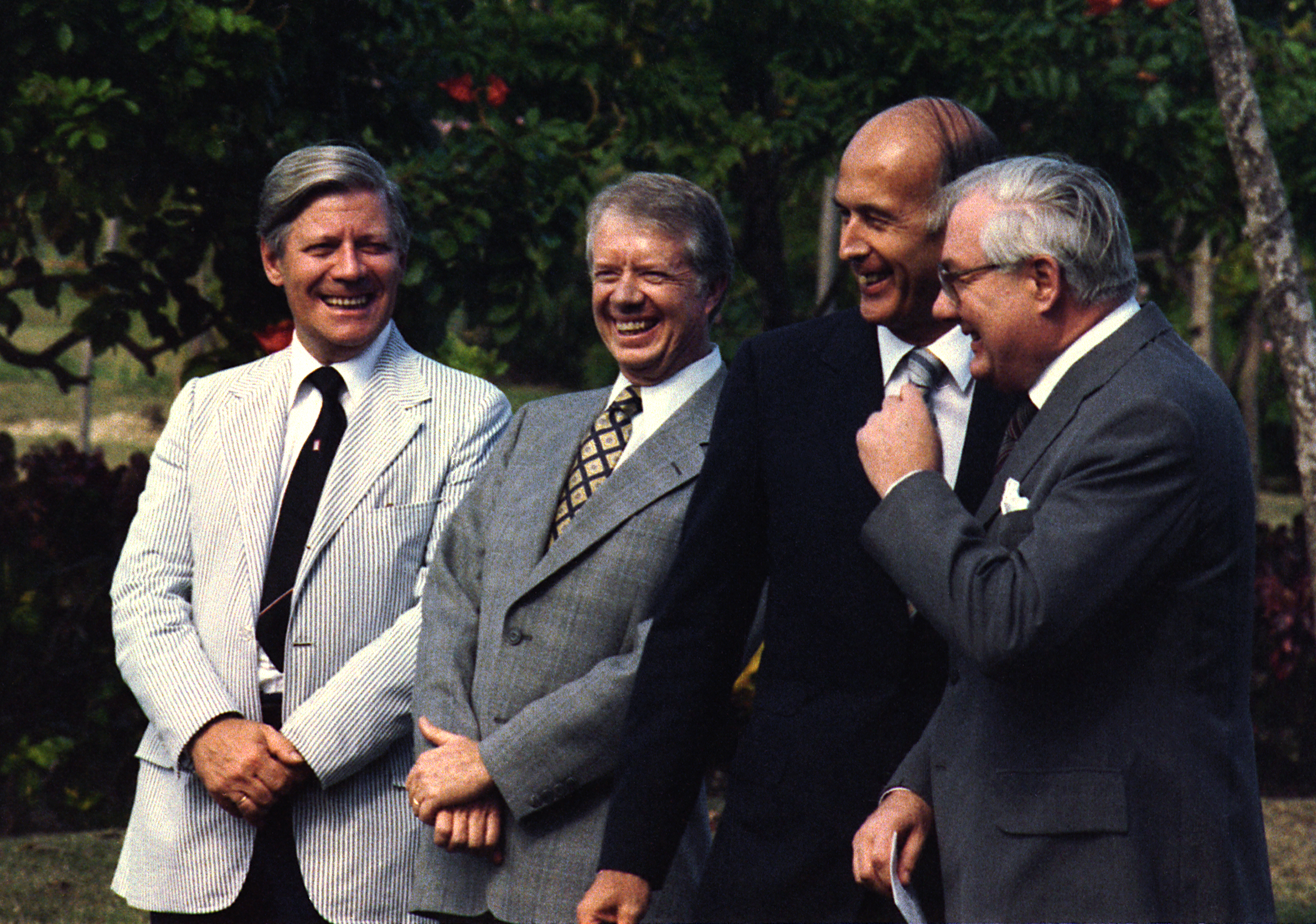
Leaders Helmut Schmidt of West Germany, Jimmy Carter of the U.S., Giscard and James Callaghan of Britain, in Guadeloupe, 1979

Giscard was a pragmatist who billed himself as "a conservative who likes change." In 1975 he invited the heads of government from West Germany, Italy, Japan, the United Kingdom and the United States to a summit to form the Group of Six major economic powers (now the G7, including Canada). In support of European economic unification, Giscard and his friend West German Chancellor Helmut Schmidt launched the European Monetary System (EMS) in April 1978.

In 1977, in Opération Lamantin, Giscard ordered fighter jets to deploy in Mauritania and suppress the Polisario guerrillas fighting against Mauritanian military occupation of Western Sahara. It failed to keep the French-installed Mauritanian leader Moktar Ould Daddah in power, as he was overthrown by his own army. A peace agreement was signed with the Sahrawi resistance.

Giscard took an interest in the regime of Jean-Bédel Bokassa in the Central African Republic. Giscard was initially a friend of Bokassa, and supplied the regime. However, the growing unpopularity of that government led Giscard to begin distancing himself from Bokassa. In 1979, French troops helped drive Bokassa out of power and restore former president David Dacko.

== See also ==
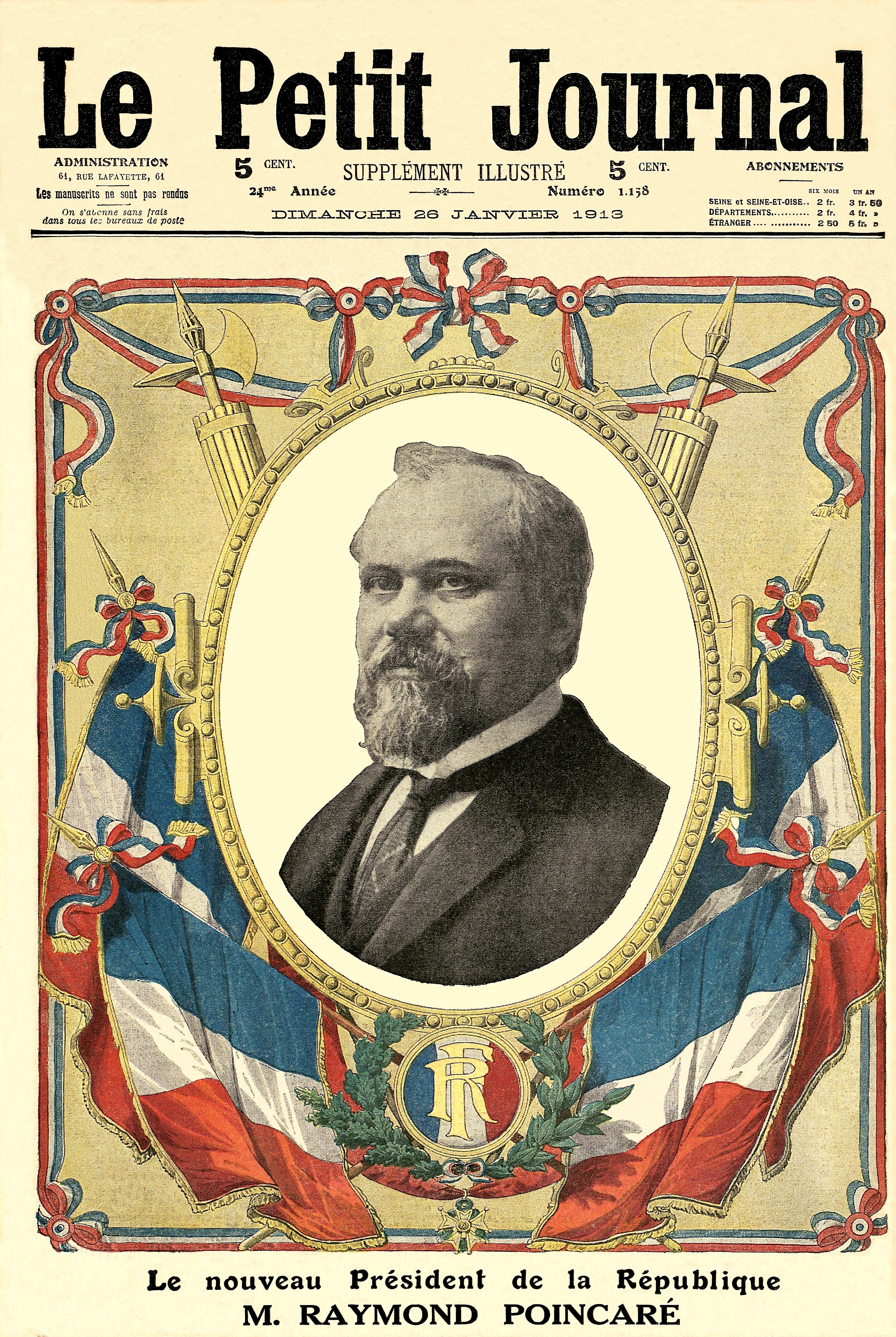
Raymond Poincaré elected president in 1913.

- French colonial empire
- International relations (1814–1919)
  - Causes of World War I
  - Diplomatic history of World War I
  - French entry into World War I
- International relations (1919–1939)
  - France and the League of Nations
  - Diplomatic history of World War II
- Military history of France
  - Napoleonic Wars
- Paris Peace Conference (1919–1920)
- Politics of France
- Territorial evolution of France
- Timeline of French history
- Austria–France relations
- Belgium–France relations
- Bulgaria–France relations
- Canada–France relations
- China–France relations
- Egypt–France relations
- France–Germany relations
  - Foreign relations of Germany
- France–Italy relations
- France–Japan relations
- France–Netherlands relations
- France–Russia relations, includes USSR
- France–Serbia relations
- France–Spain relations
- France–Thailand relations
- France–Turkey relations
- France–Ukraine relations
- France–United Kingdom relations, includes England
- France–United States relations
