= Monney =

Monney is a surname. Notable people with the surname include:

- Akissi Monney (born 1979), Ivorian judoka
- Alain Monney (1951–2026), Swiss comedian and actor
- Alexis Monney (born 2000), Swiss alpine skier
- Arnaud Monney (born 1981), Ivorian footballer
- Maurice Monney-Bouton (1892–1965), French rower
