= United Kingdom and the League of Nations =

The United Kingdom and the League of Nations played central roles in the diplomatic history of the interwar period 1920-1939 and the search for peace. British activists and political leaders helped plan and found the League of Nations, provided much of the staff leadership, and Britain (alongside France) played a central role in most of the critical issues facing the League. The League of Nations Union was an important private organization that promoted the League in Britain. By 1924 the League was broadly popular and was featured in election campaigns. The Liberals were most supportive; the Conservatives least so. From 1931 onward, major aggressions by Japan, Italy, Spain and Germany effectively ruined the League in British eyes.

== Eric Drummond, Secretary-General, 1920-1933 ==
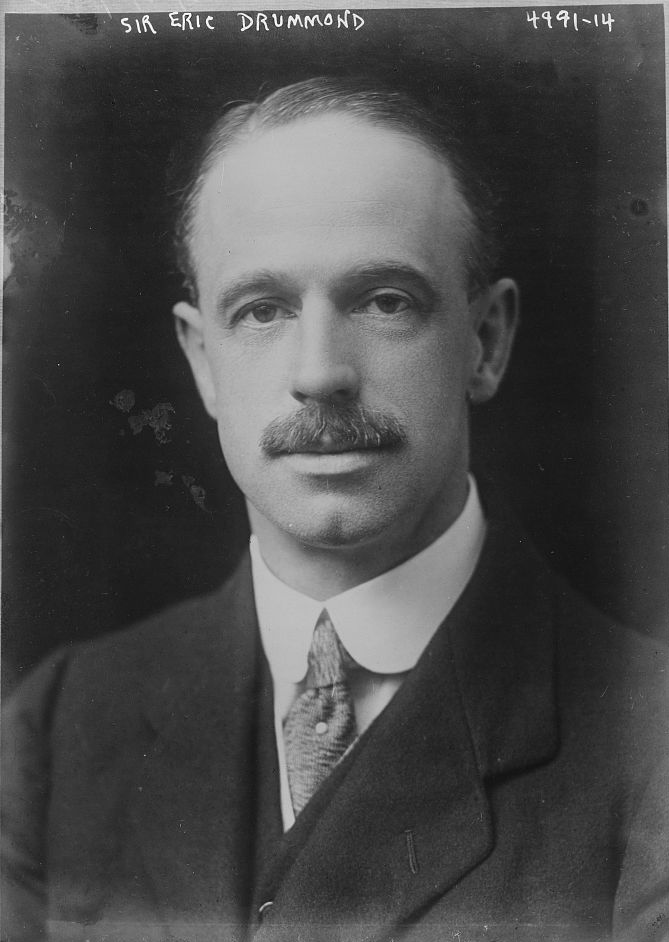
Sir Eric Drummond in 1918

Between 1918 and 1919, he was a member of the British delegation to the Paris Peace Conference, where he was engaged in the drafting of the Covenant of the League of Nations. In 1919 he accepted the position of the Secretary-General of the League of Nations, on the recommendation of Lord Cecil.

Before the 1919 Paris Peace Conference in 1919, much work had been put into finding a suitable candidate for secretary-general of the newly-established League of Nations. Cecil, who played a key role in drafting the Covenant and organising the League, initially wanted a person with a background in politics for the post; there were several suitable candidates, but none accepted his proposal. He believed that only somebody of the highest ability would be sufficient for this role. However, after it transpired that the office holder would not be given as many powers as initially thought, Cecil reconsidered and sought to find somebody who was a well-trained civil servant and less known as a big political figure. He first approached Maurice Hankey, who for some time showed interest in the position but in the end rejected the offer only ten days before the Paris plenary session. In the event that Hankey would turn down the offer, Cecil and the American Edward M. House had developed a contingency plan to substitute Hankey with Sir Eric Drummond.

As early as 1915, Drummond expressed himself favourably towards the establishment of an international organisation. As such, Drummond was involved in negotiations regarding the establishment of the League of Nations. In addition, he was also a British national, which Cecil valued very highly. Drummond was an experienced diplomat and had earned a high reputation during his 19 years at the Foreign Office, which helped him to be considered the best choice available.

After some initial doubt in which Drummond expressed anxiety about organising the League, he finally accepted the proposal. At the Paris Peace Conference's plenary session on 28 April 1919, the conference accepted the appointment of Drummond as the first secretary-general of the League of Nations.

=== Establishment of permanent secretariat (1919–1920) ===
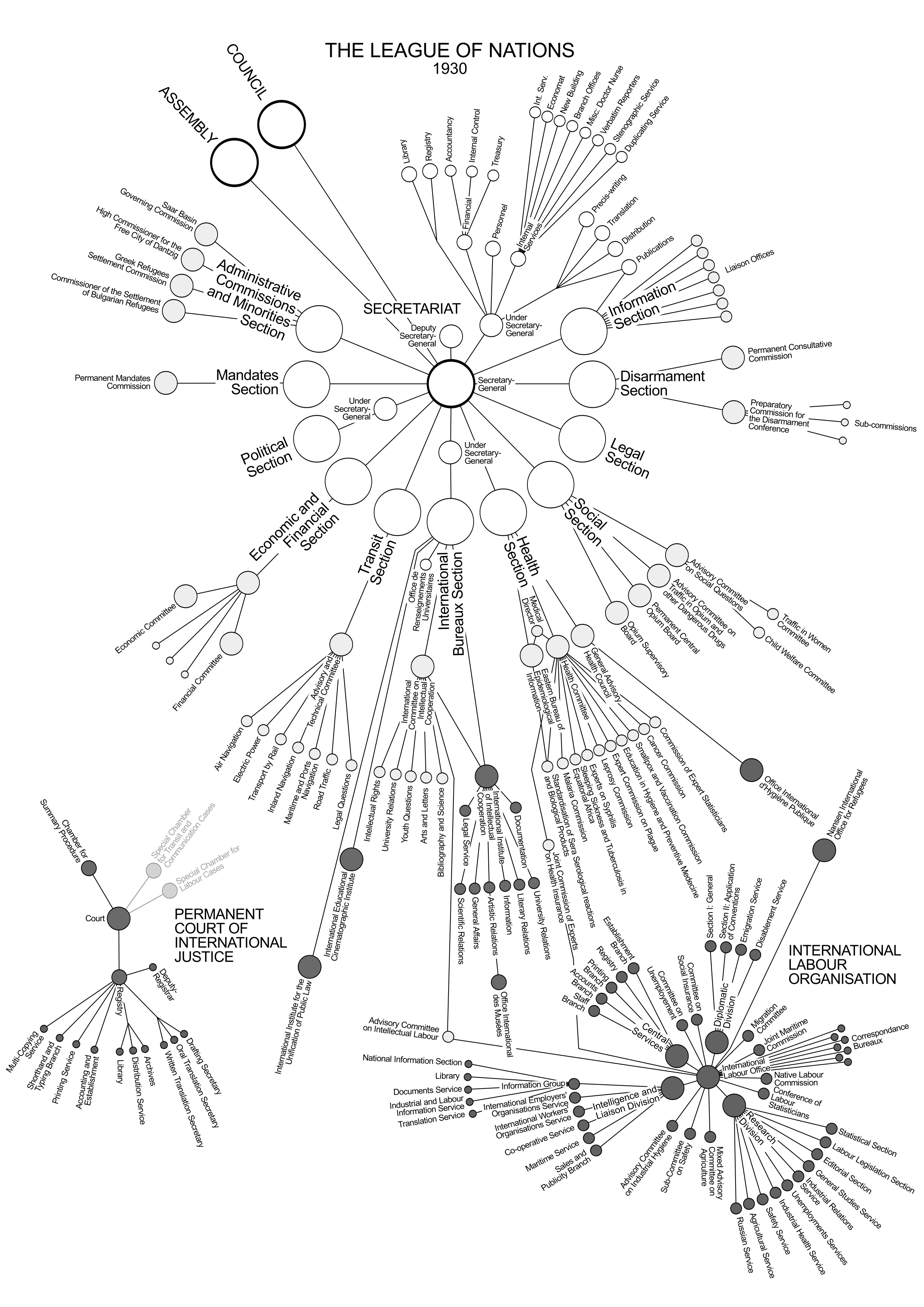
Organization chart of the International Secretariat of the League (here in 1930), established by Drummond.

One of the secretary-general's major deeds was the establishment of a permanent and strictly international secretariat. No such thing had ever been attempted, and prewar secretariats had largely been confined to the national sphere as regards who supplied them and the civil servants who worked there. The creation of an international civil service was problematic, and administrative leaders thought it unthinkable that such a body would ever be united, loyal or efficient. By August 1920 the secretariat was fully established.

The secretariat's personnel came from over 30 countries and differed in language, religion and training. They were all appointed by the League, not by national governments. That once again underscored the difference between the new international body and previous national secretariats. In all, the secretariat came to consist of seven sections: a Mandate Section, an Economic and Financial Section, a Section for Transit and Communication, a Social Section, a Political Section, a Legal Section and an International Bureau Section.

=== Leadership style ===
Drummond approached the role conservatively. His somewhat-subdued role in the British Foreign Office easily transferred over to the position of secretary-general. He was not a major political figure and so did not seek to turn the office into a reflection of his personality.

Drummond set about creating the administrative divisions for the League. He took no risk in his appointments to senior positions in the League of Nations and chose to appoint only members who supported their nation's government and gave the positions only to members of leading states.

Drummond was regarded as taking great care with issues and taking his position very seriously. He would read everything that came to his desk and would often call meetings regularly to discuss various issues. The meetings would often take place with various members of governments, which managed to established contact by his appointments to the League. Drummond thus became aware of sensitive information from various governments and nongovernmental organisations but became someone who could be trusted by various politicians worldwide.

He was widely regarded as shying away from the public and political spotlight, despite the high-profile nature of his position. He, however, was believed to be highly political behind the scenes but was often forced to do to appease various nations and because of often lacking support from many governments. One example was his 1920s dealings with Benito Mussolini's policies towards the Balkans, Africa and Europe. Drummond was unable to condemn any of Mussolini's policies publicly, as he did not have the backing of Britain and France. He wanted to maintain good relations with Italy, which helped to render him somewhat impotent.

Drummond had to perform his function behind the scenes of the League. He took great care to maintain world peace, as was hoped during the creation of the League, but he also appeased nations, rather than keeping them in check against international law. Despite the limitations coming from outside the League, he largely decided how he would run the office since he was very seldom under any kind of supervision. Drummond became regarded as a central hub within the League of Nations for most issues, and he would often pick the ones that interested him the most and delegate the lesser issues to his staff. He could thus be regarded as a leader who used the office for his own political interests.

=== National links of League officers ===
The ideal underpinning the secretariat and those working there was one much resembling a Weberian understanding of bureaucracy, the idea of a non-political, neutral, effective and efficient bureaucrat. Drummond admitted, "It is not always those who secure public praise to whom thanks are mainly due, and the work unknown to the public which is done behind the scenes is often a large factor in the success which has been obtained".

The ideal was not always upheld, and national preferences were never really abandoned. New under-secretaries-general who were appointed were more often than not of the same nationality, with candidates of smaller powers excluded. Drummond did not practice what he preached, which created small national islands from which the appointed officials conducted national, rather than international, politics.

In 1929, the Assembly decided to make a thorough investigation of the secretariats, the International Labour Organization and the Permanent Court of International Justice. The minority report showed that the political influence in substantive issues by the secretariats and its main officers was enormous and could not be overlooked. However, that was not recognised by Drummond before the 1950s and until then had readily defended the notion of nonpolitical character of international secretariats.

Despite the political character of the international civil service, the Secretariat came to be widely recognised as an instrument of the highest efficiency and the structural framework became a model for future international civil services, such as seen in the United Nations.

=== Role during crises ===
During Drummond's secretary-generalship there were several crises that called for his attention. The League of Nations' Council relied on the willingness of its members to use their militaries to apply its collective security mandate during crises. Many of them centred on border disputes from the collapse of empires after the First World War. As the League got involved in such matters throughout the 1920s with members and non-members alike, Drummond was at the centre of the talks and the negotiations. The League was involved in disputes in Latin America, the Baltics and then China. Peter Yearwood argues that although Drummond was an idealist, as were most other people, he also 'made use' of his connections in politics. Drummond was widely regarded as somebody who shied away from the public and political limelight, despite the high-profile nature of his position. He managed to achieve that but was believed to be highly political behind the scenes. He was often forced to appease various nations because he often lacked support from governments.

One example was his dealings with Benito Mussolini's policies in the 1920s towards the Balkans, Africa and the rest of Europe. Drummond was unable to give a public condemnation of Mussolini's policies, as he had the backing of neither Britain nor France and wanted to maintain good relations with Italy. That was one of the many reasons that helped to render him a somewhat impotent leader.

Drummond had to perform his function behind the scenes of the League of Nations. He took great care to maintain world peace, as was hoped during the creation of the League of Nations, but he appeased nations, rather than keeping them in check against international law. Despite the limitations coming from outside the League of Nations, he largely decided how he would run the office within it, since he was very seldom under any kind of supervision. He became regarded as a central hub within the League of Nations for most issues, and would often pick the ones that interested him the most and delegate the lesser issues to his staff. He could thus be regarded as a leader who used the office for his own political interests.

Another factor that partly drove Drummond's ambitions and his way of handling the crises presented before him was his religion. He was a devout Catholic, which had a significant impact in his dealings with the Polish–Lithuanian War early in his career. He strongly urged a plebiscite to which Poland could agree, most Poles being Catholic. Also, Drummond seemed to be pro-active. On the crisis between Russia and Finland over the latter's independence gained after the First World War, Drummond was one of the first to consider a possible solution.

Another important factor of his secretary-generalship was his willingness to step beyond the boundaries given to him in his position. During the crisis over the Chaco War near the end of Drummond's career at the League, he was praised for being a helpful mediator and for doing more than his position allowed.

=== Mukden Incident ===
One of the less successful moments for Drummond was one of the most prominent crises of Drummond's career, the Mukden Incident. China allegedly blew up part of a railroad, which Japan then used as an excuse to invade Manchuria. China appealed to the League for measures against Japan.

According to Michael E. Chapman, Drummond's initial response was not that of an imperialistic western leader but that of a bureaucrat. Somewhat limited in his powers, he looked towards the two most powerful Western nations in the region, Britain and the United States, which more or less stated that they were 'too busy' to deal with the crisis at hand.

When the crisis reached its peak, Stimson advised Drummond to "strengthen and support treaty obligations" the Japanese action had caused British discomfort. He was advised to try not to arouse nationalist feelings in Japan. Drummond wanted to be an active player in the crisis but was mostly outplayed by Henry Stimson and Hugh R. Wilson.

== Public opinion in Britain ==
British public opinion was generally favorable toward the League, providing its major basis of popular and financial support. However Conservatives were generally suspicious, especially regarding the danger of naval disarmament to its control of the oceans. David Lloyd George, prime Minister until 1922, believed that the League without the United States was a member was a worthless and probably dangerous organization. He quietly made sure that it dealt with minor items of little importance, and this approach was largely supported by the other powerful member France. (Russia and Germany were not members at first.) The league was heavily a European organization, at a time when most of Asia and Africa was in the control of European powers. The independent nations of the Latin America were all members, but they rarely took leadership roles. Indeed, the Covenant had acknowledged the Monroe doctrine, to the effect that the nations of the Western hemisphere could handle their own affairs without recourse to the League of Nations.

=== League of Nations Union ===
In every member nation, organizations were formed to generate public support and publicity for the League of Nations. The most successful support organization worldwide was the League of Nations Union (LNU) in Great Britain.

The LNU was formed by the merger of the League of Free Nations Association in the U.S. and the League of Nations Society in Britain. They were already working for the establishment of a new and transparent system of international relations, human rights, and for world peace through disarmament and universal collective security, rather than traditional approaches such as the balance of power and the creation of power blocs through secret treaties.

The LNU promoted international justice, collective security and a permanent peace between nations based upon the ideals of the League of Nations. By the mid-1920s, it had over a quarter of a million subscribers. By contrast the comparable French organization was one-fourth the size. LNU's paid membership peaked in 1931 at 407,000 in 2,982 local branches, 295 junior clubs, and 3,058 local Protestant church chapters (heavily based in Nonconformist churches). After 1931 membership steadily declined.

By the 1940s, after the disappointments of the international crises of the 1930s and the descent into World War II, membership fell to about 100,000. There was another problem. Pacifists were less and less willing to maintain membership as the LNU in the 1930s more and more proposed economic sanctions and suggested military sanctions against aggressive nations.

==== Activities ====
According to B. J. C. McKercher, LNU had considerable success in leading the mainstream of British society to its cause, including labour, the churches and the principal newspapers. LNU was most influential in the Liberal Party, although that party was rapidly losing MPs. It had great strength in the Labour Party, which was growing. It was weakest in the Conservative Party, which dominated politics in the 1930s. Most Conservatives were deeply suspicious of the LNU's support for pacifism and disarmament. The three main leaders were Gilbert Murray (an Oxford professor), Lord Robert Cecil (who helped Woodrow Wilson design the League of Nations Covenant in 1919), and the general secretary, J. C. Maxwell Garnett.

In terms of impact on the government, Birn argues that it helped push the government to admit Germany to the League in 1926, impose an arms embargo during the Far Eastern crisis of 1933, and to impose sanctions against Italy in 1935. These were exceptional, Birn argues, because these were rare instances where the LNU got its way in controversial issues.

==== Peace Ballot ====
The most famous operation of the LNU was its organisation of the Peace Ballot of 1935. It asked British adults to decide on questions relating to international disarmament and collective security. The Peace Ballot was a private operation not an official government-sponsored referendum. More than eleven million people participated in it, representing strong support for the aims and objectives of the League of Nations, influencing policy makers and politicians. The results were publicised worldwide. The vote for military action against international aggressors, as a matter of last resort, was almost three-to-one.

==== Educational programmes ====
The LNU was highly successful in reaching schools; teachers were eager to join. It provided publications, films, speakers and lesson plans that were endorsed by Local Education Authorities, and the National Union of Teachers. Brian J. Elliott shows the material downplayed simple moralism, criticized narrow nationalism and gave historical studies a broad European perspective.

== British role in major panels ==
=== Conference of Ambassadors ===
"The Conference of Ambassadors of the Principal Allied and Associated Powers" was an inter-allied organization of the Allies of World War I following World War I. Formed in Paris in January 1920, it was the successor of the Supreme War Council and was soon incorporated into the League of Nations. It became less active after the Locarno Treaties of 1925 and formally ceased to exist in 1931.

The Conference consisted of ambassadors of the United States Great Britain, Italy, and Japan accredited in Paris and French minister of foreign affairs. The American ambassador attended as an observer because the United States was not an official party to the Treaty of Versailles. French diplomat René Massigli was its secretary-general for its entire existence. It was chaired by French foreign ministers, among them Georges Clemenceau, Raymond Poincaré and Aristide Briand.

The most important British action in the Conference was brokering an agreement in 1923 between Italy and Greece in the Corfu incident. When brigands murdered several Italian diplomats on the Greek island of Corfu, the Mussolini government issued an overnight ultimatum, bombarded the island, and demanded a large cash payment. Britain brokered a settlement that favored the Italians. Most historians consider it a failure that underlined the basic weakness of the League of Nations when dealing with a powerful member. A minority opinion of historians argues that British action was suitable and honourable.

== British role in major proposals ==
=== Åland Islands dispute of 1920–21 ===
When Finland was part of Russia, it controlled the Åland Islands. In 1920 now that Finland was independent, Sweden called on the principle of self-determination, pointing out the island population was 90% Swedish and wished to join Sweden. The British took the lead in setting terms for negotiations before the League of Nations. It ruled in favour of Finland in 1921.

=== Admission of Albania and Bulgaria ===
After extensive debate on the question of admitting Albania and Bulgaria, Lord Cecil proved most convincing, and secured their admission in late 1920.

=== Admission of Germany ===
The admission of Germany was much more complicated. Britain under Lloyd George strongly recommended admission, but France was bitterly hostile. The Germans misplayed their diplomacy so badly that the British gave up trying. The 1925 Locarno agreement enabled German admission, but there were further delays caused by a crisis over giving a permanent seat on the Council to Spain or Brazil. Germany was finally admitted in 1926 and given the permanent seat in question. David Carlton argues that Foreign Minister Austen Chamberlain badly mismanaged Britain's role, defied public opinion inside Britain, and made many Europeans hostile to Britain.

=== Treaty of Mutual Guarantee ===
Disarmament was a high priority for the League, but it proved increasingly difficult to come up with a solution. The problem is that if almost everyone was disarmed, the remaining armed power would be very dangerous. In the context of Europe in the 1920s, the fear was that Germany could quickly rearm, threaten the neighbor, and the disarmed members of the League would be helpless to stop it. Lord Cecil (at the time a delegate from South Africa) proposed a solution in 1922 called the Treaty of Mutual Guarantee. Every country that signed, and had reduced its armaments according to the agreed schedule, would be protected. If anyone attacked it, the Treaty would guarantee that the victim would be immediately support by all the other signatories. France and Britain, although quarreling on many other issues, supported the proposal. As the other nations debated the proposal, confusion and difficulty arose – some governments said the proposal went too far, others said it did not go far enough, and few were actually satisfied with it. Latin American states ignored the issue. The report of the Permanent Elements Commission, representing military leaders, said such a treaty would never work. Finally in September 1923 a French draft retitled the "Treaty of Mutual Assistance" was supported by majority, with a large dissenting minority. At the time Italy and Greece were at swords' point, so the proposed treaty was not just a hypothetical solution to imaginary problems. Lord Cecil, now a member of the British government, built up support. The new version would empower the Consul to designate an aggressor, apply economic sanctions, mobilize military forces, and supervise their action. In the early 1920s, however, the proposal failed. The Soviet Union and United States rejected the proposed treaty, and Germany criticized. Italy and France gave support. The British dominions were opposed. The death blow for the proposed treaty came in Geneva on 4 September 1924 when Prime Minister Ramsay MacDonald rejected it and called instead for a system of arbitrating disputes.

The idea of a military force for an international organization was more than 20 years away from becoming a reality in 1924, but became a function of the League's replacement, the United Nations. In 1950, the UN Security Council and General Assembly authorized a joint force to enter the Korean War.

=== Geneva Protocol of 1924 ===
A draft treaty was assembled in 1923 that made aggressive war illegal and bound the member states to defend victims of aggression by force. Since the onus of responsibility would, in practice, be on the great powers of the League, it was vetoed by Great Britain, who feared that this pledge would strain its own commitment to police its British Empire.

The "Geneva Protocol for the Pacific Settlement of International Disputes" was a proposal by British Prime Minister Ramsay MacDonald and his French counterpart Édouard Herriot. It set up compulsory arbitration of disputes and created a method to determine the aggressor in international conflicts. All legal disputes between nations would be submitted to the World Court. It called for a disarmament conference in 1925. Any government that refused to comply in a dispute would be named an aggressor. Any victim of aggression was to receive immediate assistance from League members.

British Conservatives condemned the proposal for fear that it would lead to conflict with the United States, which also opposed the proposal. The British Dominions strongly opposed it. The Conservatives came to power in Britain and in March 1925 the proposal was shelved and never reintroduced.

== See also ==
- France and the League of Nations
- International relations (1919–1939)
- Interwar Britain
- United Kingdom and United Nations
