= France and the League of Nations =

Historical French foreign relations

France and the League of Nations was a major theme of French foreign policy in the 1920s and 1930s. France and the United Kingdom were the two dominant players in world affairs and in League affairs, and usually were in agreement. The League proved ineffective in resolving major problems. In 1945 it was replaced with the United Nations, where France played a major role despite its much weaker status. However in the 1920s and 1930s the main themes of French foreign policy focused on defense against Germany, and took place outside of League jurisdiction.

France played a significant role in the League of Nations, though its influence and commitment to the organization was complex. France was one of the founding members of the League of Nations and was represented on the League's Council as a permanent member. As a major Allied power in World War I, France was instrumental in the creation of the League and the drafting of its Covenant.

However, France's relationship with the League was often strained. While six members of the British Empire belonged to the League, Paris did not permit any of its colonies to join. France was wholly consumed with European affairs, and in its League work it largely ignored the affairs of Asia or Africa. France in the 1920s supported the League's mission of collective security and disarmament and supported all the major decisions.

However in the 1930s it became disillusioned as the League failed to prevent the aggressions of Japan, Hitler's Germany and Mussolini's Italy . France's leaders prioritized appeasement of these aggressors over upholding the League's principles, contributing to the organization's decline.

== 1920s and 1930s ==
French foreign and security policy after 1919 used traditional alliance strategies to weaken German's potential to threaten France and comply with the strict obligations devised by France in the Treaty of Versailles. The main diplomatic strategy came in response to the demands of the French army to form alliances against the German threat. Germany resisted then finally complied, aided by American money, and France took a more conciliatory policy by 1924 in response to pressure from Britain and the United States, as well as to French realization that its potential allies in Eastern Europe were weak and hard to coordinate. It proved impossible to establish military alliances with the United States or Britain. A tentative Russian agreement in 1935 was politically suspect and was not implemented. The alliances with Poland and Czechoslovakia; these proved to be weak ties that collapsed in the face of German threats in 1938 in 1939.

=== 1920s ===
From 1925 until his death in 1932, Aristide Briand, as prime minister during five short intervals, directed French foreign policy, using his diplomatic skills and sense of timing to forge friendly relations with Weimar Germany as the basis of a genuine peace within the framework of the League of Nations. He realized France could neither contain the much larger Germany by itself nor secure effective support from Britain or the League. France avoided the League in its violent controversy with Germany over the payment of reparations demanded by the Treaty of France. Instead the United States took the lead in resolving the bitter tension, with the Dawes Plan in 1924. It was an international effort chaired by the American banker Charles G. Dawes. It set up a staggered schedule for Germany's payment of war reparations, provided for a large loan to stabilize the German currency and ended French occupation of the Ruhr district of Germany. Germany was then able to meet its reparations payments under the new schedule.

The League helped arrange the Locarno Treaties of 1925, which helped bring Germany back into the French good graces. It guaranteed the border between France and Germany, but ignored Germany's controversial eastern border. In Poland, the public humiliation received by Polish diplomats was one of the contributing factors to the fall of the Grabski cabinet. Locarno contributed to the worsening of the atmosphere between Poland and France, weakening the French-Polish alliance. Józef Beck ridiculed the treaties saying, "Germany was officially asked to attack the east, in return for peace in the west."

In the 1920s, France built the Maginot Line, an elaborate system of static border defences, designed to fight off any German attack. The Maginot Line did not extend into Belgium, where Germany attacked in 1940 and went around the French defenses. Military alliances were signed with weak powers in 1920–21, called the "Little Entente".

=== 1930s ===
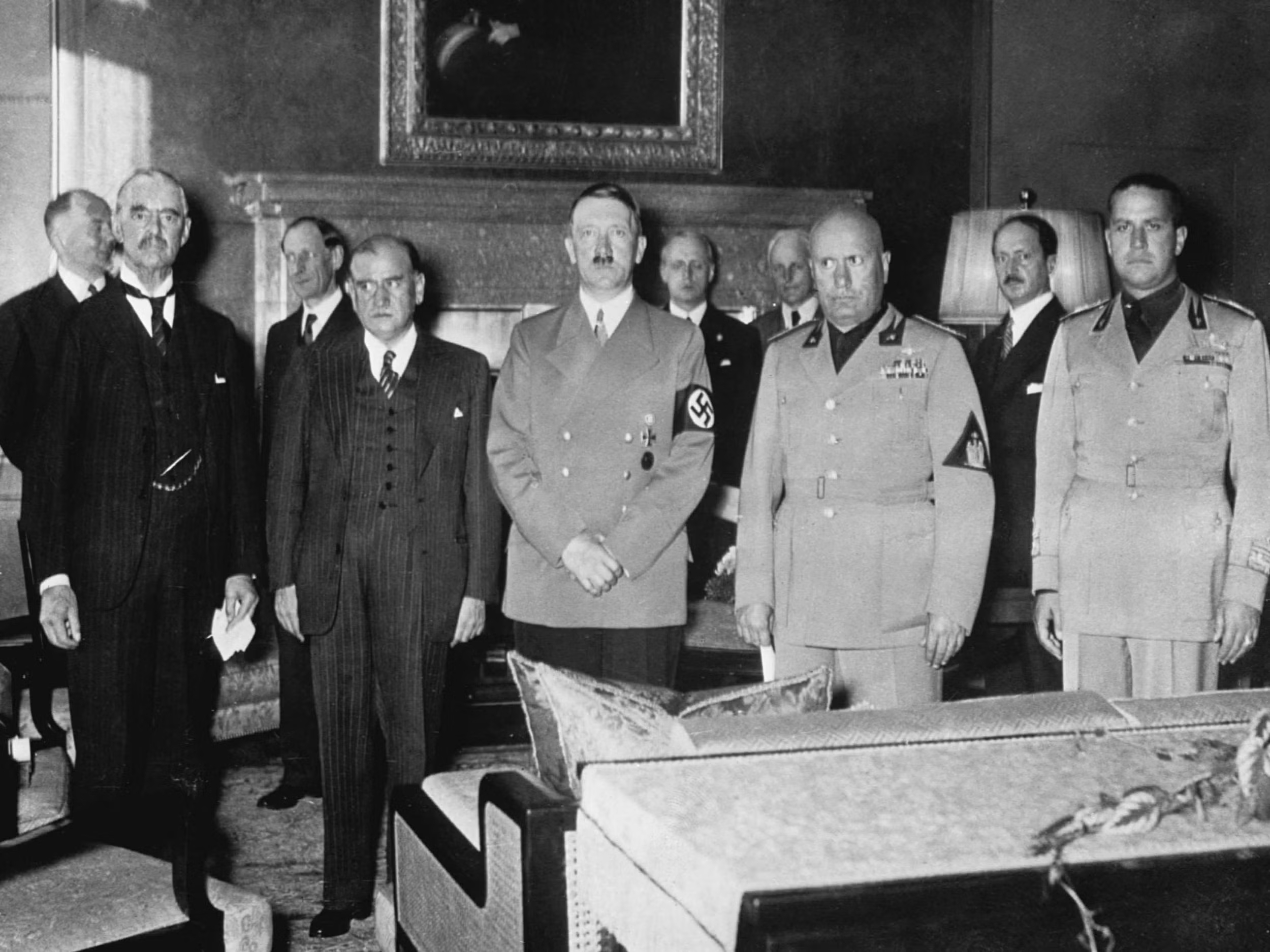
In 1938 France betrayed Czechoslovakia and signed Munich Agreement with Nazi Germany effectively dishonoring French-Czechoslovak alliance.

British historian Richard Overy explains how the country that had dominated Europe for three centuries wanted one last extension of power, but failed in its resolve:

In the 1930s France became a deeply conservative, defensive society, split by social conflict, undermined by failing and un-modernized economy and an empire in crisis. All these things explain the loss of will and direction in the 1930s.

The foreign policy of right-wing Pierre Laval (prime minister and foreign minister 1934–1936) was based on a deep distrust of Nazi Germany. He sought anti-German alliances. He and Mussolini signed the Franco-Italian Agreement in January 1935. The agreement ceded parts of French Somaliland to Italy and allowed her a free hand in Abyssinia, in exchange for support against any German aggression. In April 1935, Laval persuaded Italy and Great Britain to join France in the Stresa Front against German ambitions in Austria. On 2 May 1935, he likewise signed the Franco-Soviet Treaty of Mutual Assistance, but it was not implemented by Laval nor by his left-wing successors.

Appeasement was increasingly adopted as Germany grew stronger, for France was increasingly weakened by a stagnant economy, unrest in its colonies, and bitter internal political fighting. Appeasement was the fall-back position when it was impossible to make a major decision. Martin Thomas says it was not a coherent diplomatic strategy nor a copying of the British. When Hitler in 1936 sent troops into the Rhineland—the part of Germany where no troops were allowed—neither Paris nor London would risk war, and nothing was done. France also appeased Italy on the Ethiopia question because it could not afford to risk an alliance between Italy and Germany.

Hitler's remilitarization of the Rhineland changed the balance of power decisively in favor of the Reich. French credibility in standing against German expansion or aggression was left in doubt. French military strategy was entirely defensive, and it had no intention whatever of invading Germany if war broke out. Instead it planned to defend the Maginot Line. Its failure to send even a single unit into Rhineland signaled that strategy to all of Europe. Potential allies in Eastern Europe could no longer trust in an alliance with a France that could not be trusted to deter Germany through threat of an invasion. Without such deterrence, the ally was militarily helpless. Belgium dropped its defensive alliance with France and relied on neutrality. Paris neglected to expand the Maginot line to cover the Belgian border, which is where Germany invaded in 1940. Mussolini had previously pushed back against German expansion, now he realized cooperation with France was unpromising, so he began instead to swing in favor of Berlin. All of France's friends were disappointed – even the Pope told the French ambassador that, "Had you ordered the immediate advance of 200,000 men into the zone the Germans had occupied, you would have done everyone a very great favor."

Appeasement in union with Britain now became the main policy after 1936, as France sought peace in the face of Hitler's escalating demands. Édouard Daladier, prime minister 1938–40, refused to go to war against Germany and Italy without British support. He endorsed Neville Chamberlain who wanted to save peace using the Munich Agreement in 1938. France's military alliance with Czechoslovakia was sacrificed at Hitler's demand when France and Britain agreed to his terms at Munich in 1938.

The left-wing Léon Blum government in 1936–37 joined the right-wing Britain government in establishing an arms embargo during the Spanish Civil War (1936–39). Blum rejected support for the Spanish Republicans because of his fear that civil war might spread to deeply divided France. As the Republican cause faltered in Spain, Blum secretly supplied the Republican cause with warplanes, money and sanctuaries. The government nationalized arms suppliers, and dramatically increased its program of rearming the French military in a last-minute catch up with the Germans. It also tried to build up the weak Polish army.

French foreign policy in the 1920s and 1930s aimed to build military alliances with small nations in Eastern Europe in order to counter the threat of German attacks. Paris saw Romania as an ideal partner in this venture, especially in 1926 to 1939. During World War II the alliance failed. Romania was first neutral and then after Germany defeated France in 1940 it aligned with Germany. The main device France had used was arms sales in order to strengthen Romania and ensure its goodwill. French military promises were vague and not trusted after the sellout of Czechoslovakia at Munich in 1938. By 1938 France needed all the arms it could produce. Meanwhile, Germany was better poised to build strong economic ties. In 1938-39 France made a final effort to guarantee Romanian borders because it calculated that Germany needed Romanian oil, but Romania decided war with Germany would be hopeless and so it veered toward Berlin.

== See also ==
- France and the United Nations
- History of French foreign relations
- International relations (1919–1939)
- United Kingdom and the League of Nations
