= Bulgaria–France relations =

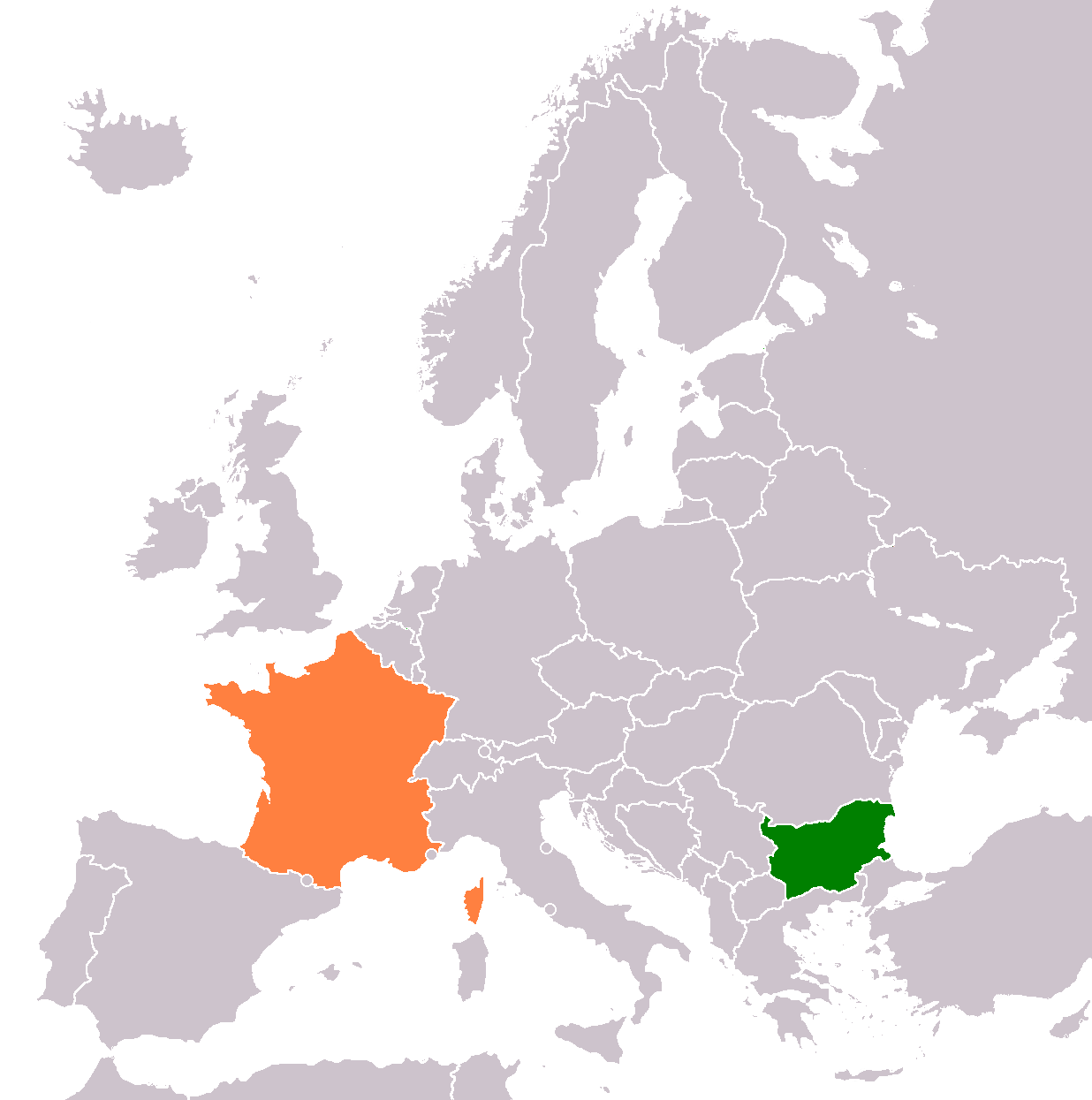

- Bulgaria: France

Diplomatic mission
- Embassy of Bulgaria, Paris: Embassy of France, Sofia

Bulgaria–France relations are foreign relations between Bulgaria and France. Diplomatic relations between both countries were established on July 8, 1879. They were enemies in World War I and II, but in present times, they have a good relationship. Bulgaria is a full member of the Francophonie since 1993. Bulgaria has an embassy in Paris. France has an embassy in Sofia. Both countries are full members of the Council of Europe, the European Union and NATO. France gave full support to Bulgaria's applications for membership in the European Union and NATO. French president Nicolas Sarkozy helped in the liberation of the Bulgarian nurses who had been framed in the HIV trial in Libya.

== the European Union and NATO ==
France is a founding member of the European Union, while Bulgaria joined in 2007. France is a founding member of NATO, while Bulgaria joined in 2004.

== Resident diplomatic missions ==
- Bulgaria has an embassy in Paris and a consulate-general in Lyon.
- France has an embassy in Sofia.

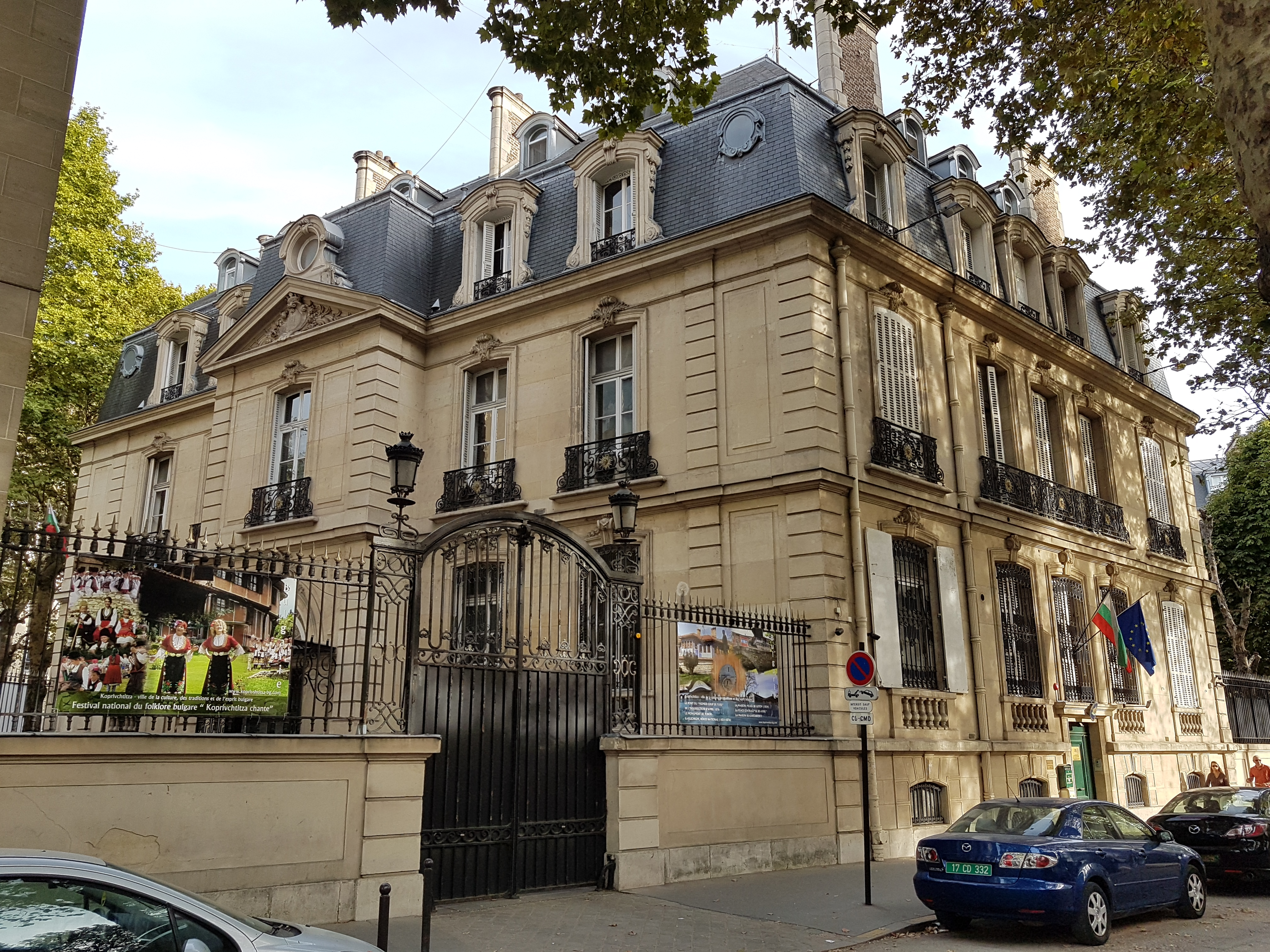
Embassy of Bulgaria in Paris

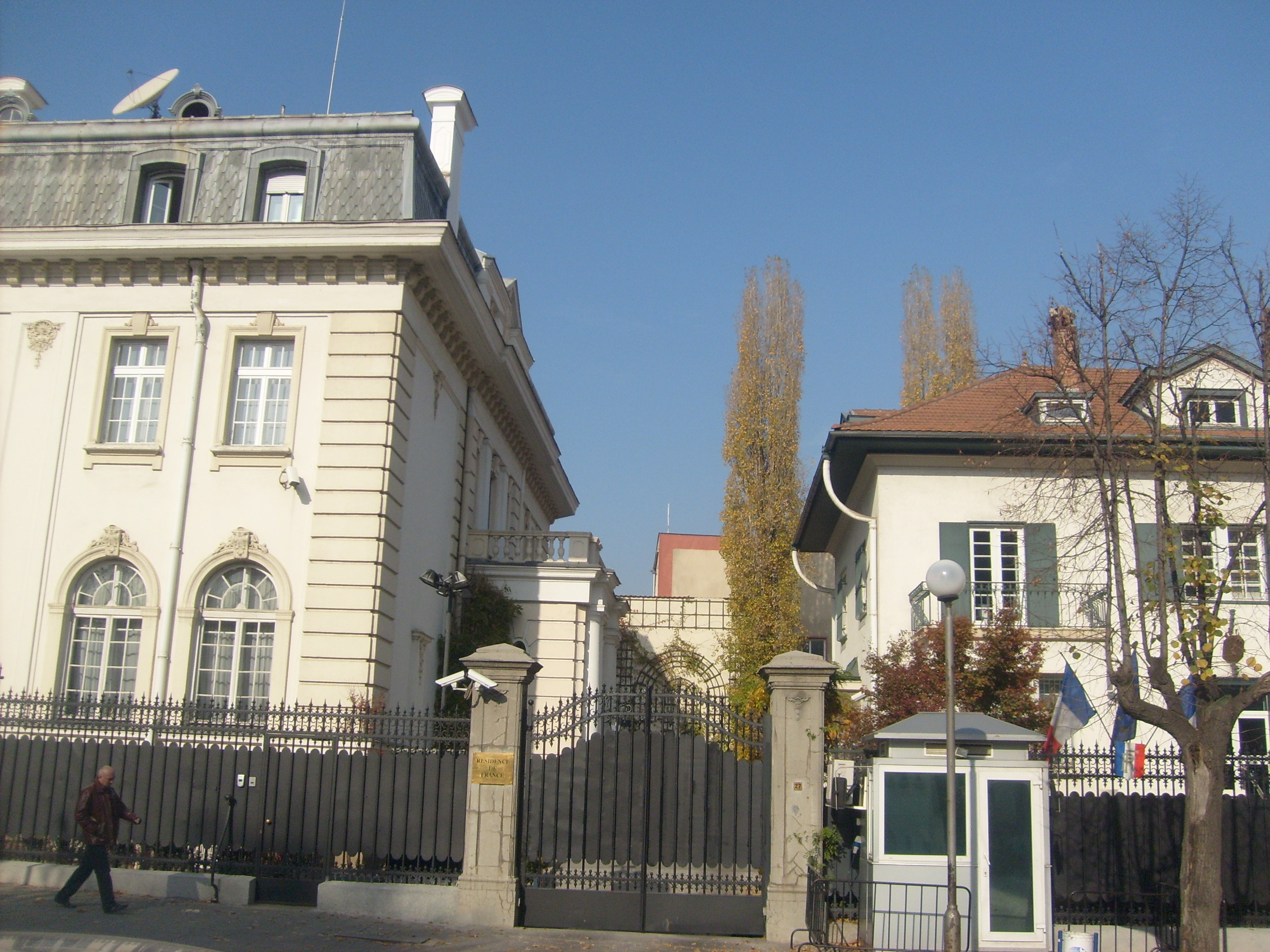
Embassy of France in Sofia

== See also ==
- Foreign relations of Bulgaria
- Foreign relations of France
- Bulgarians in France
