= Arnaud Lisembart =

French footballer (born 1984)

Personal information
- Date of birth: 29 December 1984 (age 41)
- Place of birth: Le Mans, France
- Height: 1.77 m (5 ft 9 1/2 in)
- Position: Defender

Team information
- Current team: Le Mans Villaret

Senior career*
Years	Team	Apps	(Gls)
2004–2006	Le Mans	1	(0)
2006	Oud-Heverlee Leuven		
2007	Cherbourg		
2007–2009	Rodez		
2009–2010	Rouen		
2011–2014	Sablé-sur-Sarthe		
2014–2015	Le Mans		
2015	Le Mans Villaret		
2016–2018	Stade Olympique du Maine		

Managerial career
- 2015: Le Mans Villaret
- 2016–2018: Stade Olympique du Maine
- * Club domestic league appearances and goals as of 15:08, 20 November 2009 (UTC)

Arnaud Lisembart (born 29 December 1984) is a French retired professional football player.

Previously, he played on the professional level in Ligue 2 for Le Mans and one season in Belgium with Oud-Heverlee Leuven in the Belgian Second Division. His other previous clubs include Cherbourg, Rodez, Sablé-sur-Sarthe and Rouen.
