= Arnaud Margueritte =

French footballer (born 1973)

Personal information
- Full name: Arnaud Margueritte
- Date of birth: 7 March 1973 (age 53)
- Place of birth: Rouen, France
- Height: 1.84 m (6 ft 1/2 in)
- Position: Goalkeeper

Team information
- Current team: Chalon

Senior career*
Years	Team	Apps	(Gls)
1989–1991	Rouen	0	(0)
1992–1994	Avranches	8	(0)
1994–1995	Chamois Niortais	1	(0)
1995–2000	Louhans-Cuiseaux	148	(0)
2000–2001	RCF Paris	24	(0)
2001–2002	Rouen	30	(0)
2002–2003	Nacional Madeira	0	(0)
2004–2006	Wasquehal	52	(0)
2006–2008	Blois	?	(?)
2008–2009	Chalon	?	(?)

Managerial career
- 2013–2015: Louhans-Cuiseaux II
- 2915–2017: Louhans-Cuiseaux
- 2017–2018: FC Abergement-de-Cuisery
- 2018–2021: Rouen (Sports Co-ordinator)
- 2021–: Rouen
- * Club domestic league appearances and goals

Arnaud Margueritte (born 7 March 1973) is a retired professional footballer. He played as a goalkeeper. He manages FC Rouen in Championnat National 1, having been appointed as joint head coach on 30 May 2021.
