= Vesselin Vassilev =

French painter

- Born: 1974 (age 51–52)
- Occupations: Artist, painter and printmaker

Vesselin Vassilev (born 1974) is a French-Bulgarian artist, painter and printmaker based in France.

== Biography ==
Vassilev was born into a family of artists in Sofia, Bulgaria. He produced his early artwork in his father's workshop, the artist and printmaker Atanas Vassilev, while his mother Brigitte Bernard was a ceramic artist. Vassilev graduated from the Fine Arts school in Sofia in 1993. In 1999 he graduated from the National Academy of Art, Sofia, Bulgaria – specialising in printmaking directed by Zdravko Stoyanov. The same year he moved to France and started his career in the region of the Savoie. Between 2002 and 2007 he lived in Paris and attended the printmaking workshop of Chaville. He has lived in Lyon since 2008. He works in the field of intaglio, painting, watercolor and drawing. Vassilev has been awarded at the 9th Print Triennial of Chamalières (FR) and at the 5th Print Biennial of Chaville (FR). His work focuses on optical illusions and the creation of symbols and allegories through a figurative narration rich in details. In etching technique he specializes in polychromatic printmaking.

== Works ==
=== Solo exhibitions ===
- 2014 Etchings - Galerie l’Antilope - Lyon - FR
- 2010 Paintings and Prints - Espace Cercle Optique - Lyon - FR
- 2010 Original Prints - Galerie de Bezance - Romagnat - FR
- 2009 Prints - Theatre des marionnettes - Lyon - FR
- 2007 Antipodes - Bulgarian Cultural Center - Paris - FR
- 2007 Between Dreams and Reality - Jean Blanc Cultural Center - La Ravoire - FR
- 2007 Metamorphoses - Tedi Gallery - Varna - BG
- 2006 Paintings and Prints - Galerie Eliane Poggi - Grenoble - FR
- 2006 Paintings and Etchings - Chapelle Vaugelas - Chambéry - FR
- 2005 Recent works - Galerie Philippe Boidet - Chambéry - FR
- 2005 Etchings - Daniel Jouvance Company - Issy-les-Moulineaux - FR
- 2004 Eternity Daedalus - Chapelle Vaugelas - Chambéry - FR
- 2004 Etchings - Unedic Company - Savoie Technolac - FR
- 2003 Aerostatic Desires - Atelier Idalie - Paris - FR
- 2003 Aerostatic Desires - Galerie de Lans - Chambéry - FR
- 2002 Paintings and Prints - Jean Blanc Cultural Center - La Ravoire - FR
- 2002 Waterclours and Prints - Banque de Savoie - Chambéry - FR
- 2001 Etchings - Chapelle Vaugelas - Chambéry - FR
- 2001 Labyrinth of Dreams - Galerie de Lans - Chambéry - FR
- 1999 Original Prints – Tedi Gallery - Varna - BG

=== Group exhibitions (selection) ===
- 2015 International Exhibition of Modern Ex-libris - Malbork - PL
- 2015 Salon de Lyon et Sud-Est - FR
- 2015 International Biennial of Gabrovo - BG
- 2014 World Print Triennial - Chamalieres - FR
- 2014 World Miniprint Annual - Sofia - BG
- 2012 Print Fair - Cotignac - FR
- 2011 Salon de Lyon et Sud-Est - FR
- 2011 Biennial of Gabrovo - BG
- 2010 Salon de Lyon et Sud-Est - FR
- 2009 Salon de Lyon et Sud-Est - FR
- 2009 From Dürer to Picasso - St.Laurent-du-Pont - FR
- 2008 Salon de Lyon et Sud-Est - FR
- 2007 Biennial of Printmaking - Ceara - BR
- 2007 3rd Biennial of Chaville - FR
- 2007 Print Biennial Arstampa - Manosque - FR
- 2006 Salon de Garches - FR
- 2006 Salon de Montrouge - FR
- 2006 Salon de l’estampe - Rueil-Malmaison - FR
- 2005 4th Print Biennial of Chaville - FR
- 2005 Biennial of Varna - FR
- 2005 Biennial of Gabrovo - BG
- 2005 4th Triennial of Havirov - FR
- 2004 XVII Premio Máximo Ramos - Ferrol - ES
- 2004 3rd Biennial Arstampa - Manosque - FR
- 2003 World Print Triennial - Chamalières - FR
- 2003 3rd Print Biennial of Chaville - FR
- 2003 Mois de l'Estampe - Paris - FR
- 2001 Ex-libris Biennial Sint Niklaas - BE
- 2000 Gize International Print Triennial - EG
- 1999 International Print Fair - Carbunar - RO
- 1999 Omer Karel De Laey Price - Hooglede - BE

=== Collections ===
- Ville de Lyon - FR
- Mairie d’Aix-les-Bains - FR
- The Gabrovo Humour Museum - BG
- Fondation Art Dialogue, Paris - FR
- COREB Company - FR
