= Arnaud Anastassowa =

French-Bulgarian footballer (born 1988)

Personal information
- Date of birth: January 23, 1988 (age 38)
- Place of birth: Forbach, France
- Height: 1.80 m (5 ft 11 in)
- Position: Central defender

Youth career
- –2005: US Forbach
- 2005–2007: FC Metz

Senior career*
Years	Team	Apps	(Gls)
2007–2009	FC Metz B	39	(0)
2007–2009	FC Metz	1	(0)
2009–2010	F91 Dudelange	3	(0)
2010–2014	US Forbach	40	(2)
2014–2015	Sarreguemines FC	3	(0)
2018–2019	FC Ensdorf		
2020–2022	US Nousseviller		
- * Club domestic league appearances and goals

Arnaud Anastassowa (born January 23, 1988) is a French professional football defender who plays for US Forbach.

== Career ==
Anastassowa began his career by US Forbach before being transferred in 2005 to FC Metz. After four years he was released from Metz and signed on 4 July 2009 with F91 Dudelange.
