= Arnaud Monney =

Ivorian footballer (born 1981)

Personal information
- Date of birth: 18 September 1981 (age 45)
- Place of birth: Abidjan, Ivory Coast
- Height: 1.78 m (5 ft 10 in)
- Position: Midfielder

Youth career
- Académie de Sol Beni

Senior career*
Years	Team	Apps	(Gls)
2004–2006	ASEC Mimosas		
2006–2007	R.O.C. de Charleroi-Marchienne	0	(0)
2007–2010	CS Sedan Ardennes	1	(0)
- * Club domestic league appearances and goals

Arnaud Monney (born 18 September 1981) is an Ivorian former footballer who played as a defender.

== Career ==
He began his career in 1994 at Académie de Sol Beni, before he was promoted in 2004 to ASEC Mimosas. He joined a Belgian club R.O.C. de Charleroi-Marchienne in July 2006 and then on 23 May 2007 switched to CS Sedan Ardennes.
