= Bulgarian Canadians =

Bulgarian Canadians Канадски българи
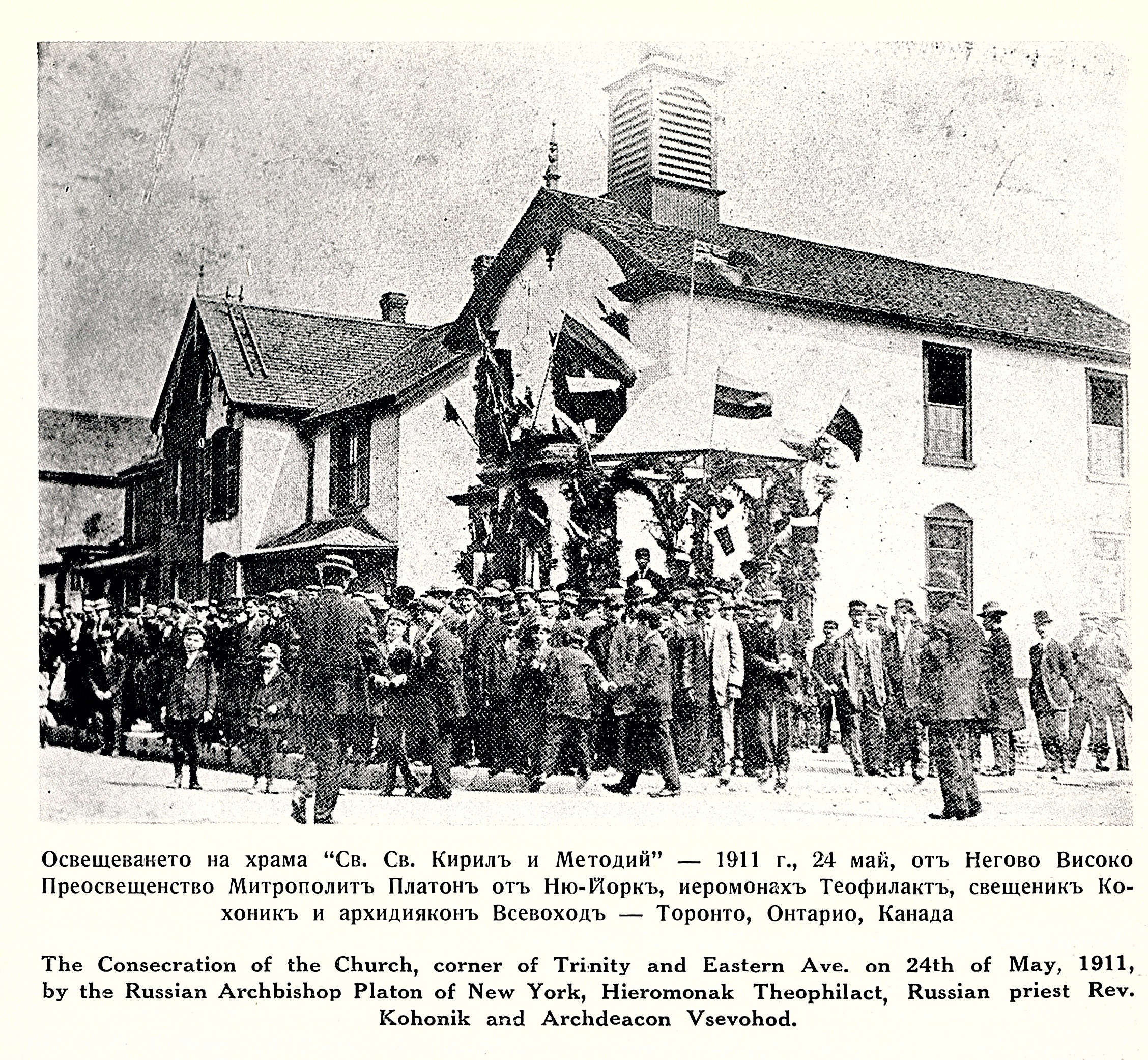
- Macedono-Bulgarian Eastern Orthodox Cathedral Sts. Cyril and Methodius in Toronto, 1911

Total population
- 33,085 (by ancestry, 2021 Census); 250,000 (unofficial estimates)

Regions with significant populations
- Ontario, Quebec, British Columbia, Alberta

Languages
- Bulgarian, Canadian English, Canadian French

Religion
- mainly Bulgarian Orthodox Christians, but also Roman Catholic, Protestants and Muslim Bulgarians.

Related ethnic groups
- Bulgarian people, Bulgarian Americans, Macedonian Canadians, Bulgarians in South America

Bulgarian Canadians (Bulgarian: канадски българи, kanadski balgari) are Canadian citizens or residents from Bulgaria or people of Bulgarian descent. According to the 2021 Census there were 33,085 Canadians who claimed Bulgarian ancestry, an increase compared to the 27,260 of the 2006 Census.

== History ==
=== Origin and numbers ===
Mass Bulgarian emigration to Canada began in the late 1890s and the early 20th century. Bulgarians primarily settled in Canada's industrial cities, mostly Toronto, Ontario, which was a major centre of Bulgarian migration to North America. Between 1900 and 1944, 19,955 people from Bulgaria settled in Canada; however, this number excludes the mass Bulgarian migration from Ottoman and later Serbian and Greek-ruled Macedonia, Dobruja, southern Thrace, the Western Outlands and Bessarabia, which was indeed the bulk of Bulgarian emigration to Canada. The largest wave of migration from the Kingdom of Bulgaria to Canada was in 1912, when 6,388 people arrived in that country. Other significant waves were those of 1914, consisting of 4,512 people, and 1907–09, which numbered 2,529.

The Canadian Census of 1921 recorded 1,765 people who identified as Bulgarians; of those, 1,378 lived in Ontario. In 1931, self-identified Bulgarians were 3,160 (2,415 in Ontario), while in 1941 they numbered 3,260 (2,553 in Ontario). Other estimates, however, list 10,000 Bulgarians in Canada by 1913, of which 4,000 in Toronto alone, and 20,000 Bulgarians in Canada by 1939. The Bulgarian colony in Toronto mostly consisted of emigrants from Macedonia and the Kostur (Kastoria) region in particular. According to Bulgarian diplomatic and ecclesiastical records of 1936, Bulgarians in Toronto alone numbered 3,500, while other estimates go up to 5,000.

The Bulgarian community in Canada is deeply linked to the Macedonian Canadians. Until World War II, most people who today identify as Macedonian Canadians claimed a Bulgarian ethnic identity and were recorded as part of the Bulgarian ethnic group. In the 1980s and 1990s, the Bulgarian community in Canada spread in larger numbers to the capital Ottawa, Ontario, Vancouver, British Columbia and Montreal, Quebec.

=== Organizations, religion and education ===
The first organization of Bulgarians in Canada, the Zhelevo Bulgarian Brotherhood or Zhelevo Benevolence Brotherhood was established in 1907 in Toronto by emigrants from Zhelevo (Antartiko) in Aegean Macedonia. Other Bulgarian organizations were soon established by emigrants from Zagorichani (Vassiliada), Oshtima (Trigono), Smardesh (Krystallopigi), Gabresh (Gavros), Banitsa (Vevi), Buf (Akritas) and Tarsie (Trivuno), all villages in Aegean Macedonia. Bulgarian emigrants from Murgash near Tsaribrod and Bansko also established emigrant organizations. Most such communities were founded in Toronto, though some were based in other Ontario towns like Kitchener, Windsor and Courtland.

The foundations of the Bulgarian Orthodox community in Canada were laid down in 1908 with the first Bulgarian ecclesiastical mission in North America. The priests Hristo Karabashev and hieromonk Theophylactus, who first visited the United States, arrived in Toronto in 1910 and established what is today the Sts. Cyril and Methodius Macedono-Bulgarian Orthodox Parish, which until 1945 remained the only such community in Canada.

On 7 March 1957 the Bulgarian Canadian Society was found.

A Bulgarian school, funded by the Bulgarian Orthodox community, was founded in Toronto as early as 1914: this was also the first Bulgarian school in the Americas. In 1924, this school had 70 pupils and two teachers. By 1928, the number of pupils was 100. Bulgarian adult schools were established by two separate organizations in 1917 and 1920, also in Toronto. Another school for children was founded in Toronto in 1934; Bulgarian schools were also established in Kitchener and Windsor in 1932 and 1936 respectively.

== Demography ==
=== Religion ===
Bulgarian Canadian demography by religion
Religious group	2021 (Note: Religious breakdown proportions based on "Bulgarian" ethnic or cultural origin response on the 2021 census.)		2001 (Note: Religious breakdown proportions based on "Bulgarian" ethnic or cultural origin response on the 2001 census.)	
Religious group	Pop.	%	Pop.	%
Christianity	22,435	67.82%	12,575	82.78%
Irreligion	9,470	28.63%	2,145	14.12%
Islam	495	1.5%	265	1.74%
Judaism	410	1.24%	150	0.99%
Buddhism	60	0.18%	15	0.1%
Hinduism	35	0.11%	0	0%
Other	170	0.51%	30	0.2%
Total Bulgarian Canadian population	33,080	100%	15,190	100%

Bulgarian Canadian demography by Christian sects
Religious group	2021		2001	
Religious group	Pop.	%	Pop.	%
Catholic	2,675	11.92%	2,275	18.09%
Orthodox	14,565	64.92%	7,715	61.35%
Protestant	1,705	7.6%	1,790	14.23%
Other Christian	3,490	15.56%	795	6.32%
Total Bulgarian Canadian Christian population	22,435	100%	12,575	100%

=== Language ===
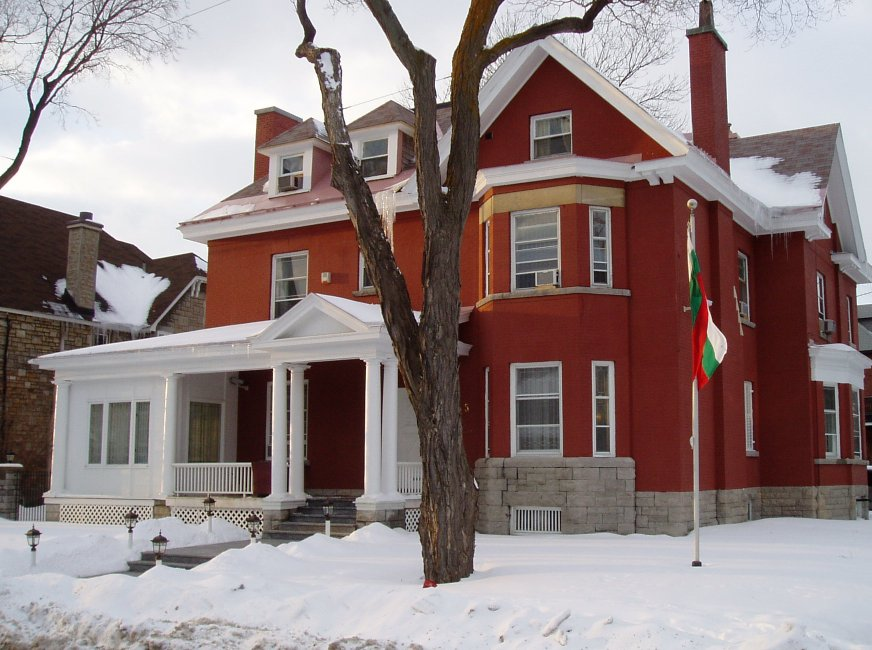
Embassy of Bulgaria in Ottawa

Some Bulgarian Canadians speak Bulgarian, especially the more recent immigrants, while others might not speak the language at all, or speak Bulgarian mixed with English to a lesser or greater extent. Some Bulgarian Canadians understand Bulgarian even though they might not be able to speak the language. There are cases where older generations of Bulgarians or descendants of Bulgarian immigrants from the early part of the 20th century are fluent in the Bulgarian language as well.

== Notable Bulgarian Canadians ==
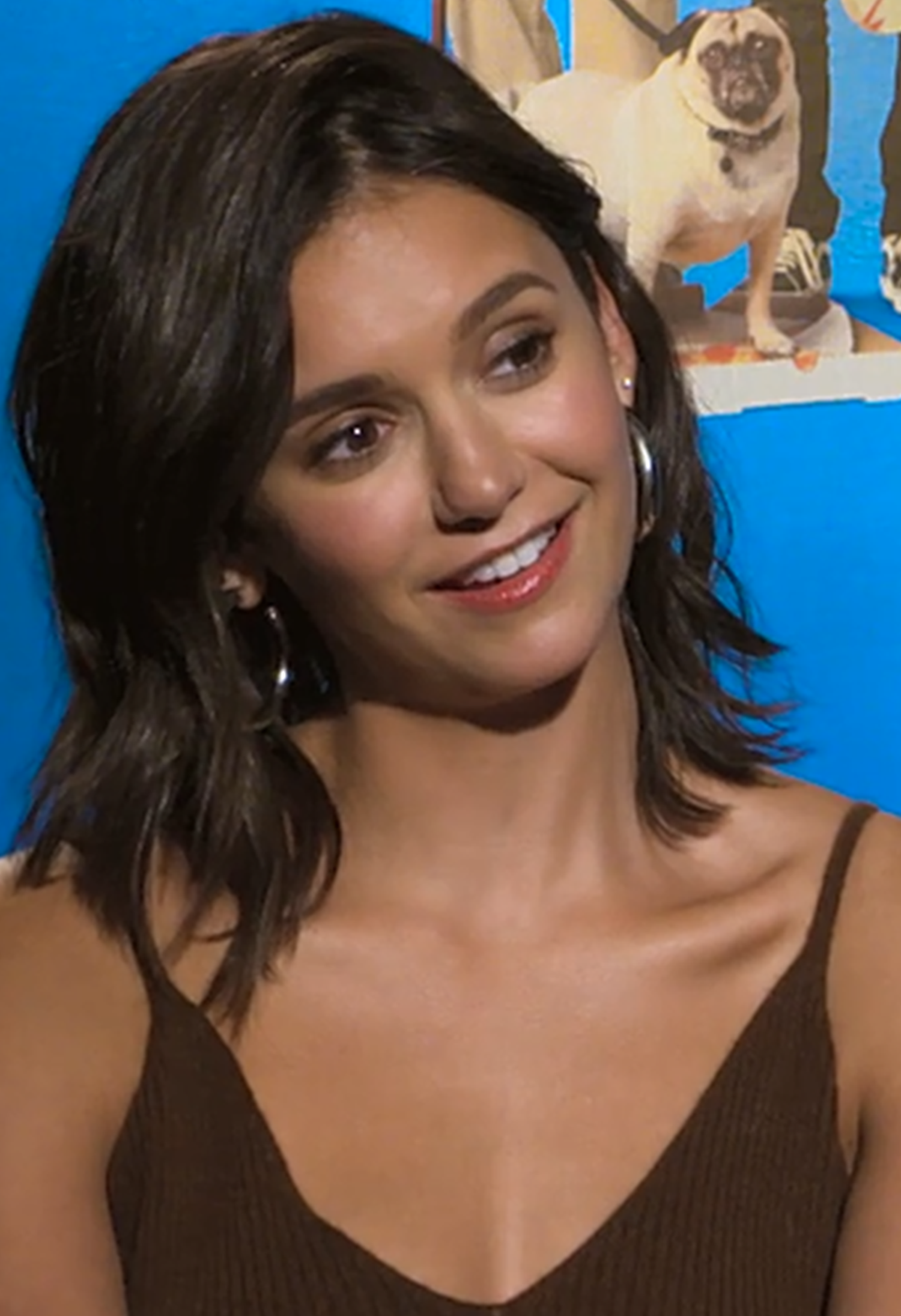
Nina Dobrev

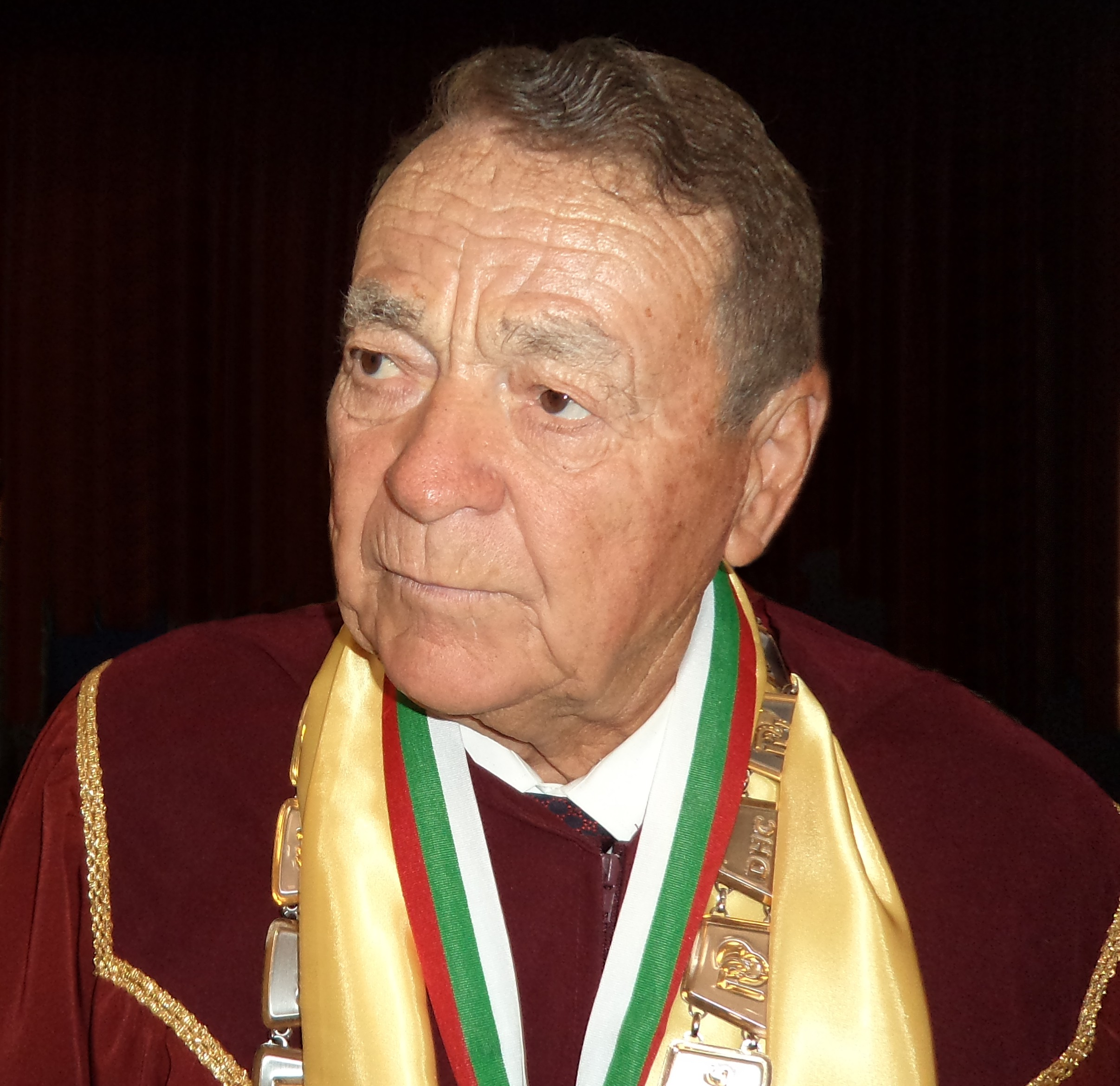
Ignat Kaneff

- Ken Boshcoff
- Nansy Damianova
- Todor Kobakov
- Nina Dobrev
- Ivan Dochev
- Alexandra Fol
- Marian Grudeff
- Ignat Kaneff
- Ted Kotcheff
- Ivan Kristoff
- Martin P. Mintchev
- Alice Panikian
- Kroum Pindoff
- Mirela Rahneva
- Ralitsa Tcholakova
- Theodore Ushev
- Theophylact Malincheff

== See also ==
- Bulgaria–Canada relations
- European Canadians
- Bulgarian Americans
- Immigration to Canada
- Ethnic groups in Canada
- Embassy of the Republic of Bulgaria in Ottawa
- Bulgarian diaspora
- Bulgarian Eastern Orthodox Diocese of the USA, Canada and Australia
