= Bulgarians in Germany =

Българи в Германия (Bulgarian) Bulgaren in Deutschland (German)
- Distribution of Bulgarian citizens in Germany (2021).

Total population
- 436,860 (2023)

Languages
- Bulgarian · German

Related ethnic groups
- Bulgarians, Bulgarian diaspora

Bulgarians in Germany (Bulgarian: Българи в Германия, romanized: Bǎlgari v Germaniya; German: Bulgaren in Deutschland) are one of the sizable communities of the Bulgarian diaspora in Western Europe. According to German statistical data from 2016, the number of Bulgarian nationals in Germany on 31 December 2023 was 436,860 (up from 53,984 in 2008).

== History ==
The Bulgarian Empire was in contact with the German-speaking lands in medieval times, though the Ottoman conquest of the Balkans in the 14th and 15th centuries severed those ties. In the 16th century, Bulgarian Orthodox clerics were known to have been in contact with the German Lutherans and by the 18th century Bulgarian merchants in Leipzig were distinguished from other Balkan Christian merchants.

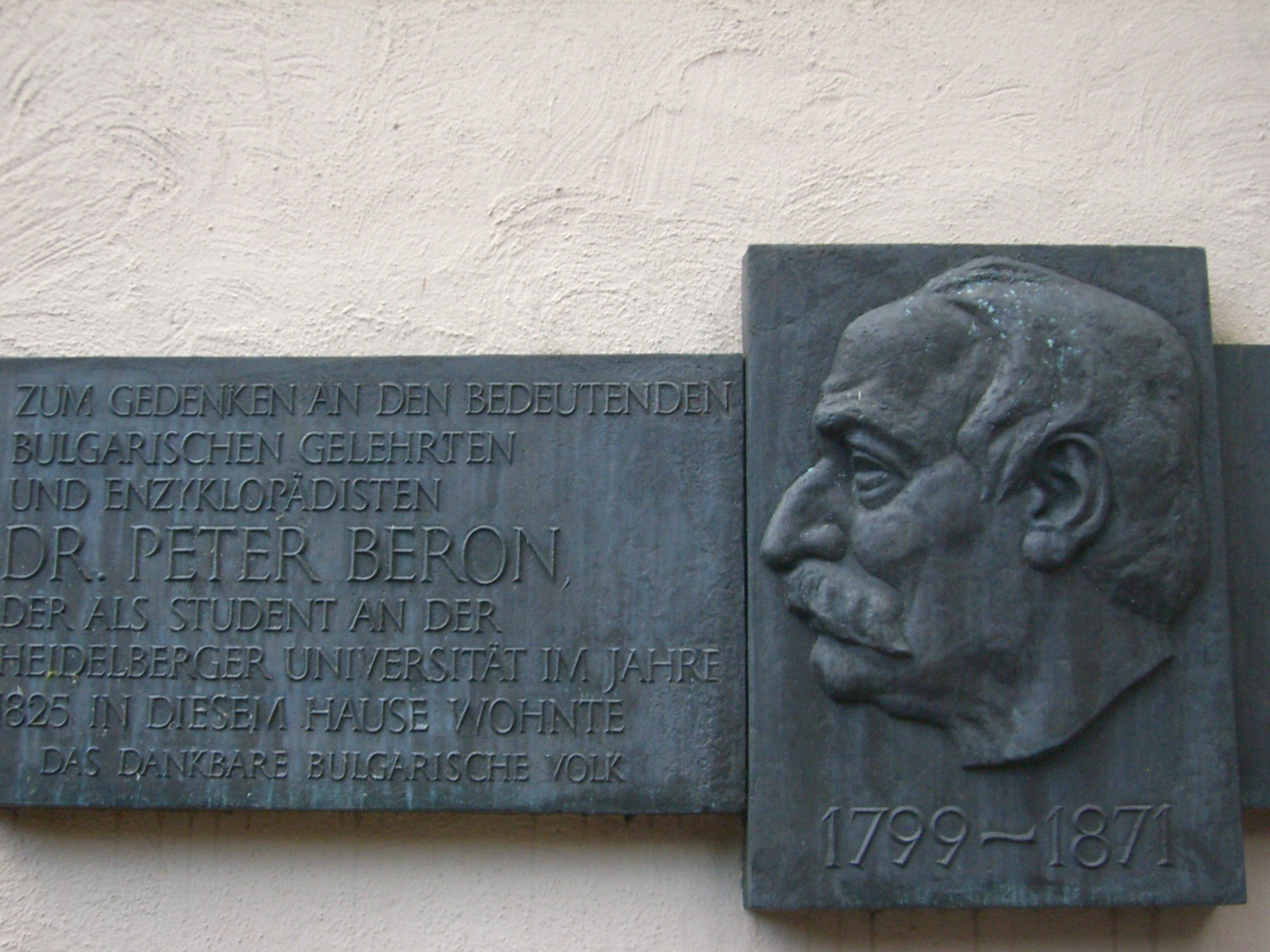
Plaque commemorating Petar Beron in Heidelberg

It was not until the 19th century, however, that German–Bulgarian ties became once again more pronounced, and this was mainly owing to education. In 1825–1831, Bulgarian enlightener Petar Beron studied at the University of Heidelberg, while from 1845 to 1847 journalist and linguist Ivan Bogorov was a student at the University of Leipzig. From 1846 to 1847, Bogorov published the first Bulgarian newspaper, Bulgarian Eagle, out of Leipzig.

After the Liberation of Bulgaria in 1878, the German Empire continued to be a centre of higher education for Bulgarians, and hundreds of Bulgarian students were sent to Germany on state scholarships by the Principality of Bulgaria and Eastern Rumelia (pre-1885). German universities were, together with universities in Switzerland, only second to those of Russia and Austria-Hungary among the most favoured foreign educational institutions for Bulgarians. Associations of Bulgarian students were formed in Leipzig, Berlin, Munich, Dresden, Heidelberg, Erlangen, Halle an der Saale and Freiburg im Breisgau in the late 19th and early 20th century. The University of Leipzig alone had 101 Bulgarian students from 1879 to 1899 and a total of 194 dissertations were successfully presented by Bulgarian students in Germany from 1900 to 1918.

The Bulgarian–German Association was established in Berlin on 16 February 1918 and had branches in many German cities. Educational ties were preserved after World War I: in 1926–1927 alone, 302 people from Bulgaria studied in Germany.

Today, there are Bulgarian Orthodox parishes in Berlin, Leipzig, Düsseldorf, Cologne, Bonn, Munich, Stuttgart, Regensburg and Passau, with a bishop's seat and cathedral in Berlin.

== Demographics ==
Number of Bulgarians in larger cities
| # | City | People |
| 1. | Berlin | 30,824 |
| 2. | Munich | 13,636 |
| 3. | Duisburg | 12,143 |
| 4. | Bremen | 9,325 |
| 5. | Hamburg | 8,830 |
| 6. | Frankfurt | 8,509 |
| 7. | Cologne | 7,916 |
| 8. | Mannheim | 6,997 |
| 9. | Nuremberg | 5,801 |
| 10. | Offenbach | 4,884 |
| 11. | Hanover | 4,138 |
| 12. | Ludwigshafen | 3,656 |
| 13. | Dortmund | 3,416 |
| 14. | Kassel | 3,046 |
| 15. | Stuttgart | 3,041 |
| 16. | Wiesbaden | 2,843 |
| 17. | Essen | 2,471 |
| 18. | Salzgitter | 2,349 |
| 19. | Mainz | 2,126 |
| 20. | Hamm | 1,944 |

== Turkish minority ==
From the early 1990s Western Europe began to attract Bulgarian Turks for the first time in their social history. Migration to Germany, in particular, was initiated by those Bulgarian Turks who, for various reasons, were unable to join the first massive migration wave to Turkey in 1989 or who were part of the subsequent return wave which was dissatisfied with the conditions of life or the social adjustment prospects there. The majority of Turks from Bulgaria migrated to Germany in the 1990s asylum regime, which provided generous social benefits.

Bulgarian Turks are to be found predominantly in the less protected sectors of the German labour market associated with ethnic businesses that require higher flexibility and tougher working conditions. They appear to rely for employment predominantly on co-ethnic networks established by German Turks. The majority of this group of Turks are relatively new in Germany which now consists of regular migrants who legalised their status largely through marriages of convenience to German citizens. Some members of this group have managed to bring their children to Germany whilst there are also a smaller number of people who have given birth in Germany.

== Notable people ==
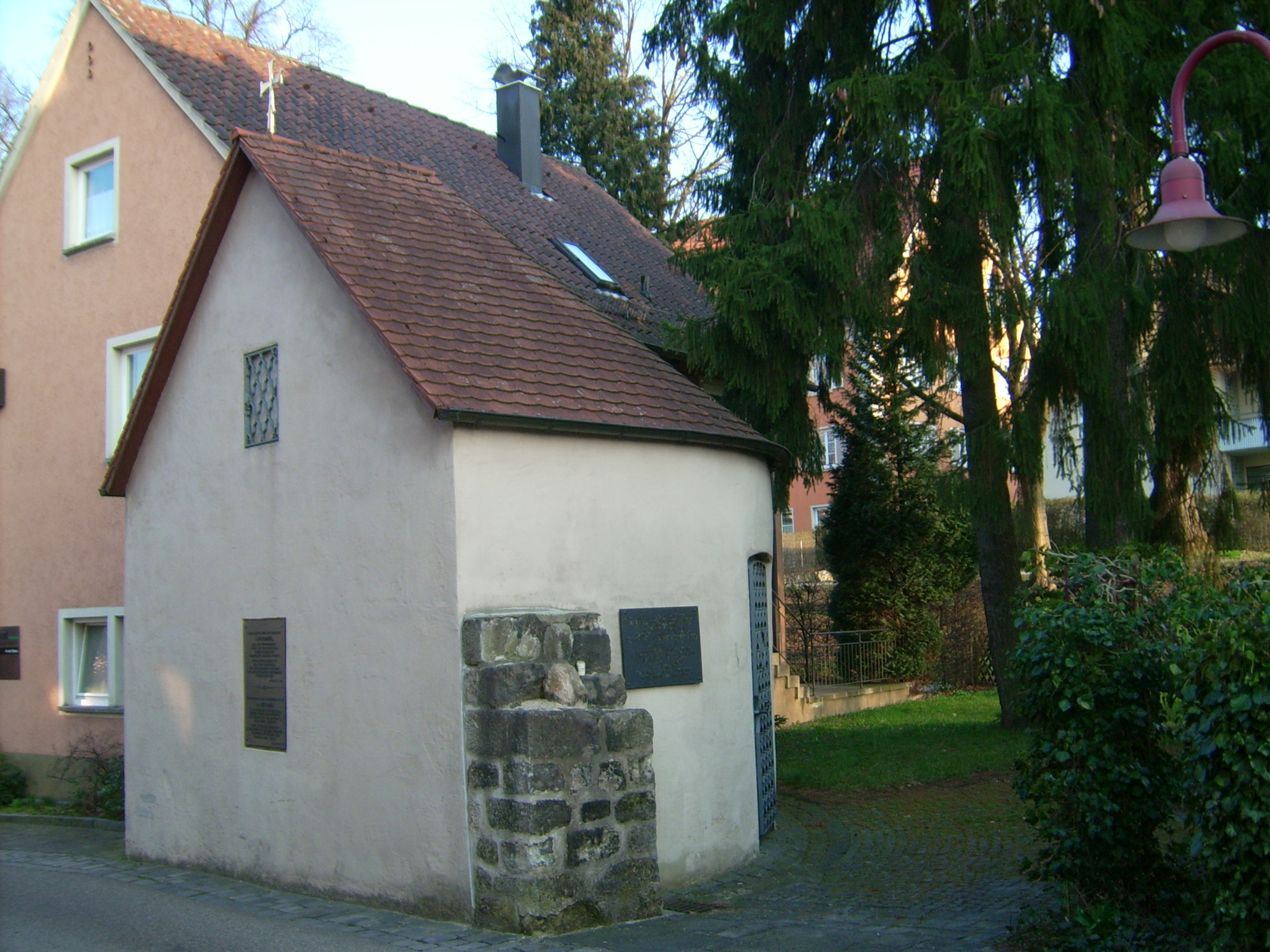
Bulgarian Orthodox chapel in Ellwangen, Baden-Württemberg

This list includes people of Bulgarian origin born in what is today Germany or people born in Bulgaria but mainly active in Germany.

- Ludmilla Diakovska (b. 1976), singer
- Dimiter Gotscheff (b. 1943), theatre director
- Dimitar Inkiow (1932–2006), writer
- Oda Jaune (b. 1979), artist
- Ari Leschnikow (1897–1978), first tenor of the Comedian Harmonists
- Mirco Nontschew (1969–2021), comedian
- Dobrin Petkov (1923–1987), conductor
- Eugen Philippow (1917–1991), electrical engineer, professor
- Ivan Stranski (1897–1979), physical chemist
- Ilija Trojanow (b. 1965), writer
- Edisson Jordanov (b. 1993), footballer
- Lukas Petkov, footballer

== See also ==
- Bulgaria–Germany relations
- Bulgarian diaspora
- Immigration to Germany
- Germans in Bulgaria

== Bibliography ==
- Колев, Йордан (2005). Българите извън България (in Bulgarian). София: Тангра ТанНакРа. pp. 257–261, 423–424. ISBN 954-9942-73-2.
- Smith, Michael; Eade, John (2008), Transnational Ties: Cities, Migrations, and Identities, Transaction Publishers, ISBN 978-1-4128-0806-4.
