= Bulgaria–Canada relations =

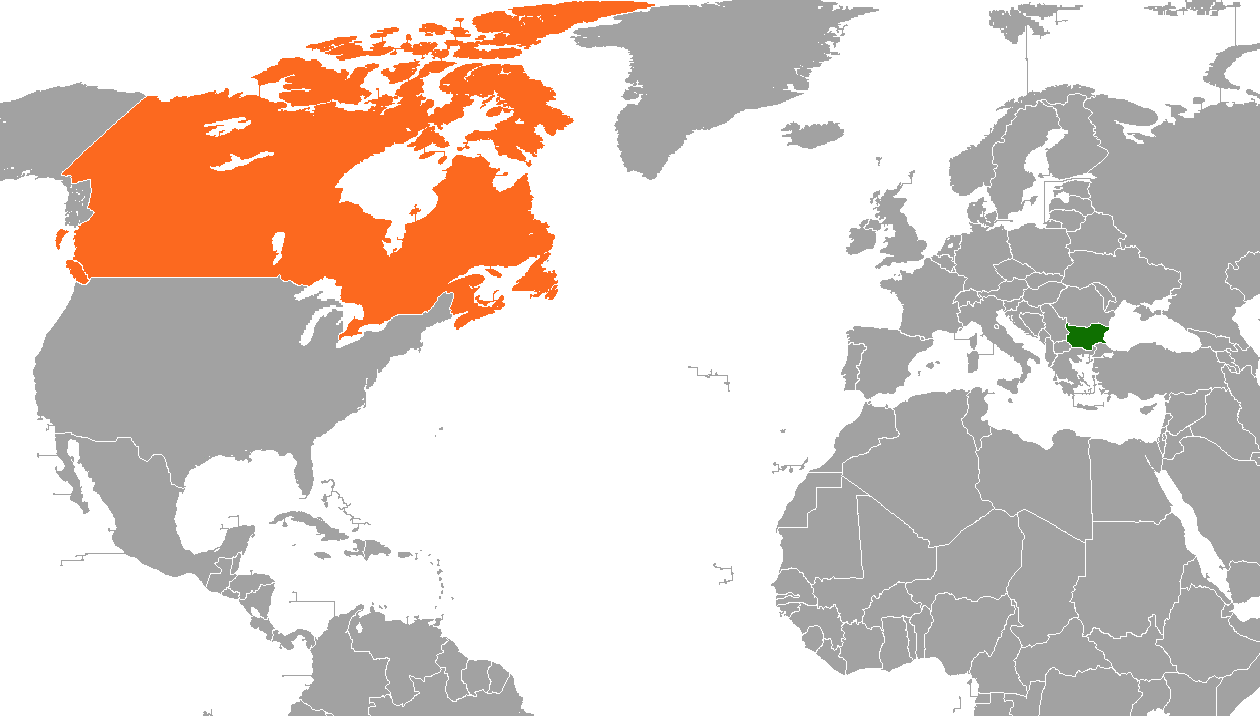

- Bulgaria: Canada

The nations of Bulgaria and Canada established diplomatic relations in 1966. Both countries are members of NATO.

== Overview ==
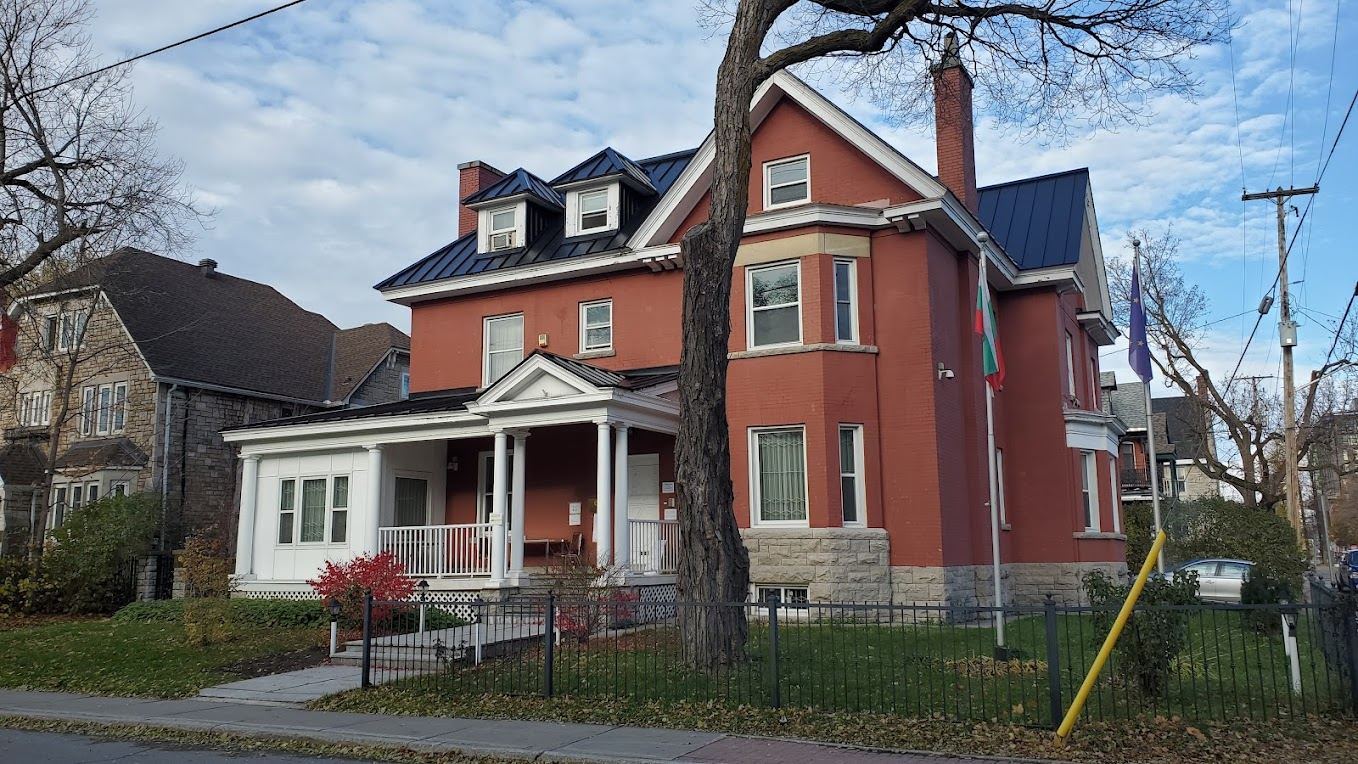
Embassy of Bulgaria in Ottawa

Canada's Ambassador in Bucharest is accredited to Bulgaria, while an Honorary Consulate in Sofia assists Canadian interests in Bulgaria. Bulgaria has an embassy in Ottawa and a consulate-general in Toronto. Bulgarian-born Canadian businessman, construction magnate and philanthropist Ignat Kaneff was the Honorary Consul of Bulgaria in Canada.

There is increasing trade and investment, effective military and security cooperation, and growing academic and cultural relations between the two countries.

Canada's Honorary Consul in Sofia plays an active role in fostering political, commercial and cultural relations between Canada and Bulgaria. His office offers consular support to Canadian citizens as well as Trade Commissioner Services and support in Bulgaria.

== Diaspora ==
More than 30,000 Canadians of Bulgarian origin live in Canada. Approximately 1,000 Canadians live permanently in Bulgaria.

== Tourism ==
Up to 15,000 Canadians visited Bulgaria in 2011.

== Economic relations ==
Bulgaria is one of Canada's largest merchandise trade partners in South East Europe with bilateral trade reaching C$534 million in 2023, comprising exports of Canadian merchandise to Bulgaria of $220 million and merchandise imports from Bulgaria of $315 million. Canadian companies are important to Bulgaria's mining industry and are showing interest in the oil and gas sector in both onshore and offshore exploration. Business opportunities for Canadian companies exist in Bulgaria in telecommunications, airport services, electrical generation and agriculture.

== Cultural relations ==
In 2024, the Canadian province of British Columbia announced May 24 as Bulgarian Cultural Heritage Day.

== Bilateral treaties and agreements ==
- Double Taxation Avoidance Agreement, which was signed on March 3, 1999.

== Resident diplomatic missions ==
- Bulgaria has an embassy in Ottawa and a consulate-general in Toronto.
- Canada is accredited to Bulgaria from its embassy in Bucharest, Romania.

== See also ==
- Foreign relations of Bulgaria
- Foreign relations of Canada
- Canada-EU relations
- NATO-EU relations
- Comprehensive Economic and Trade Agreement
- Bulgarian Canadians
