= Bulgaria–Germany relations =

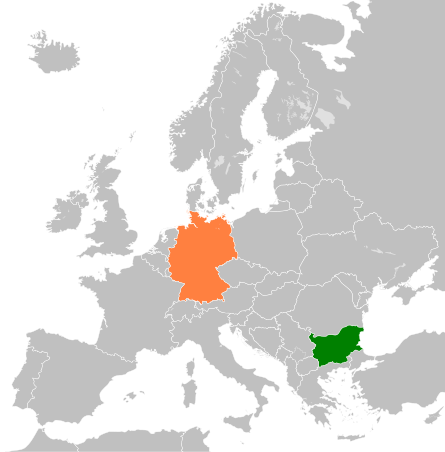

- Bulgaria: Germany

Diplomatic mission
- Embassy of Bulgaria, Berlin: Embassy of Germany, Sofia

Bulgaria–Germany relations are the bilateral relations between Bulgaria and Germany. Bulgaria has an embassy in Berlin, a general-consulate in Munich and an office in Bonn. Germany has an embassy in Sofia. As EU members, the Bulgarian government views Germany as its key strategic partner in the EU. Some Bulgarian government ministers and former President Plevneliev speak German. German experts have been and still are active in an advisory capacity in Bulgarian government ministries as part of continuing implementation measures connected with the country's EU accession. Both countries are full members of the Council of Europe, the European Union and NATO. Germany gave full support to Bulgaria's applications for membership in the European Union and NATO.

== Political history ==
In the 820s, the First Bulgarian Empire concluded a treaty with the Carolingian Empire under Emperor Louis I.

All Bulgarian monarchs after the liberation of Bulgaria and establishment of the third Bulgarian State — beginning with Alexander of Battenberg (reigning 1879–1886 as Prince of Bulgaria), his successor Ferdinand I of Bulgaria (1887–1908, Prince of Bulgaria; 1908–1918, Tsar of Bulgaria), his son Boris III of Bulgaria (1918–1943, Tsar of Bulgaria) and his son Simeon Saxe-Coburg-Gotha (1943–1946, Tsar of Bulgaria) — were all German. Simeon went into exile after the establishment of the People's Republic of Bulgaria in 1946. He returned after 1990 and became Prime Minister of Bulgaria in 2001. He left office four years later.

== Military history ==
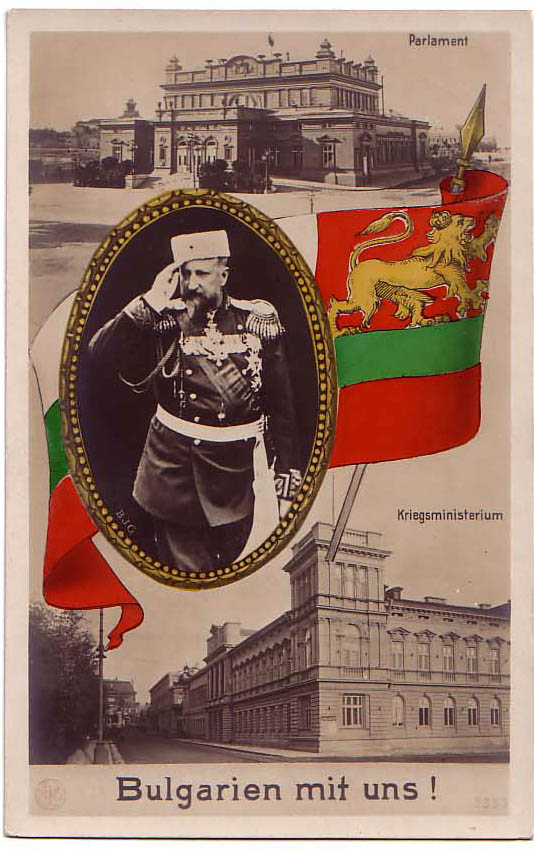
A German postcard welcoming the entry of Bulgaria into the war and showing Bulgaria's Tsar Ferdinand.

In World War I, the Tsardom of Bulgaria fought alongside the German Empire as a member of the Central Powers and signed in 1915 the initially secret Bulgaria–Germany treaty. In the aftermath of its defeat and territorial losses in the Balkan Wars Bulgaria felt betrayed and turned against its former ally Russia. Bulgaria in 1914–15 was neutral. In 1915 Germany and Austria realized they needed Bulgaria's help in order to defeat Serbia militarily thereby opening supply lines from Germany to Turkey and bolstering the Eastern Front against Russia. In return for war, Bulgaria insisted on major territorial gains, especially Macedonia, which Austria was reluctant to grant until Berlin insisted. Bulgaria also negotiated with the Entente, who offered less generous terms. In 1915 the government of liberal prime minister Vasil Radoslavov therefore aligned Bulgaria with the Central Powers even though this meant becoming an ally of the Ottomans, Bulgaria's traditional political and religious enemy. While Bulgaria now had no land claims against the Ottomans, it resented Serbia, Greece and Romania (allies of Britain and France) for seizing lands with majority Bulgarian population. Bulgaria signed an alliance with Germany and Austria in September 1915 that envisioned that Bulgaria would dominate the Balkans after victory in the war.

In 1941, Bulgaria signed the Tripartite Pact, allying itself with Nazi Germany and the Axis powers. During the Cold War, the People's Republic of Bulgaria and the German Democratic Republic were both members of the Warsaw Pact alliance, until the Reunification of Germany in 1990.

== Resident diplomatic missions ==
- Bulgaria has an embassy in Berlin and consulates-general in Düsseldorf, Frankfurt and Munich.
- Germany has an embassy in Sofia and a honorary consulate in Varna and Plovdiv.
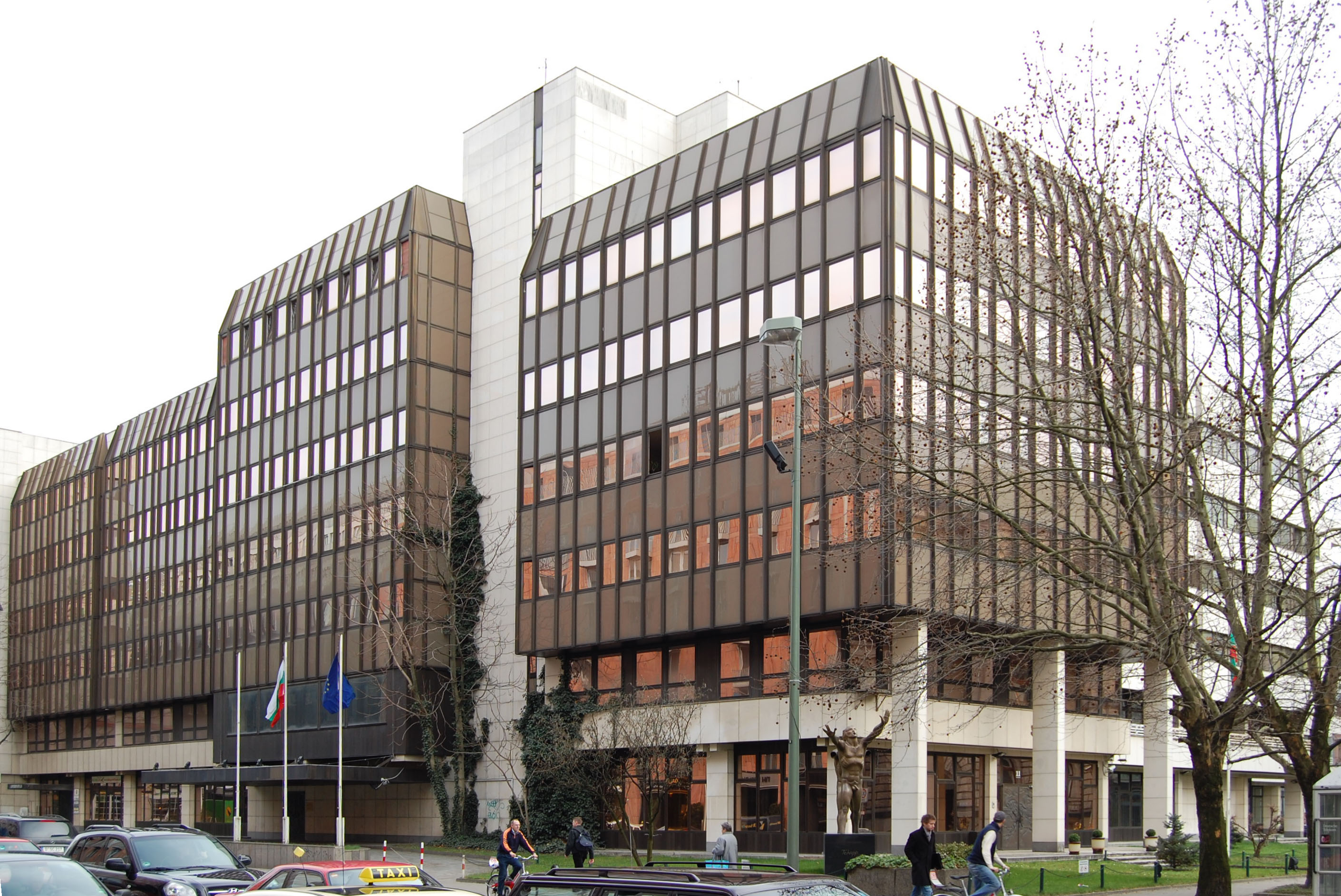
Embassy of Bulgaria in Berlin

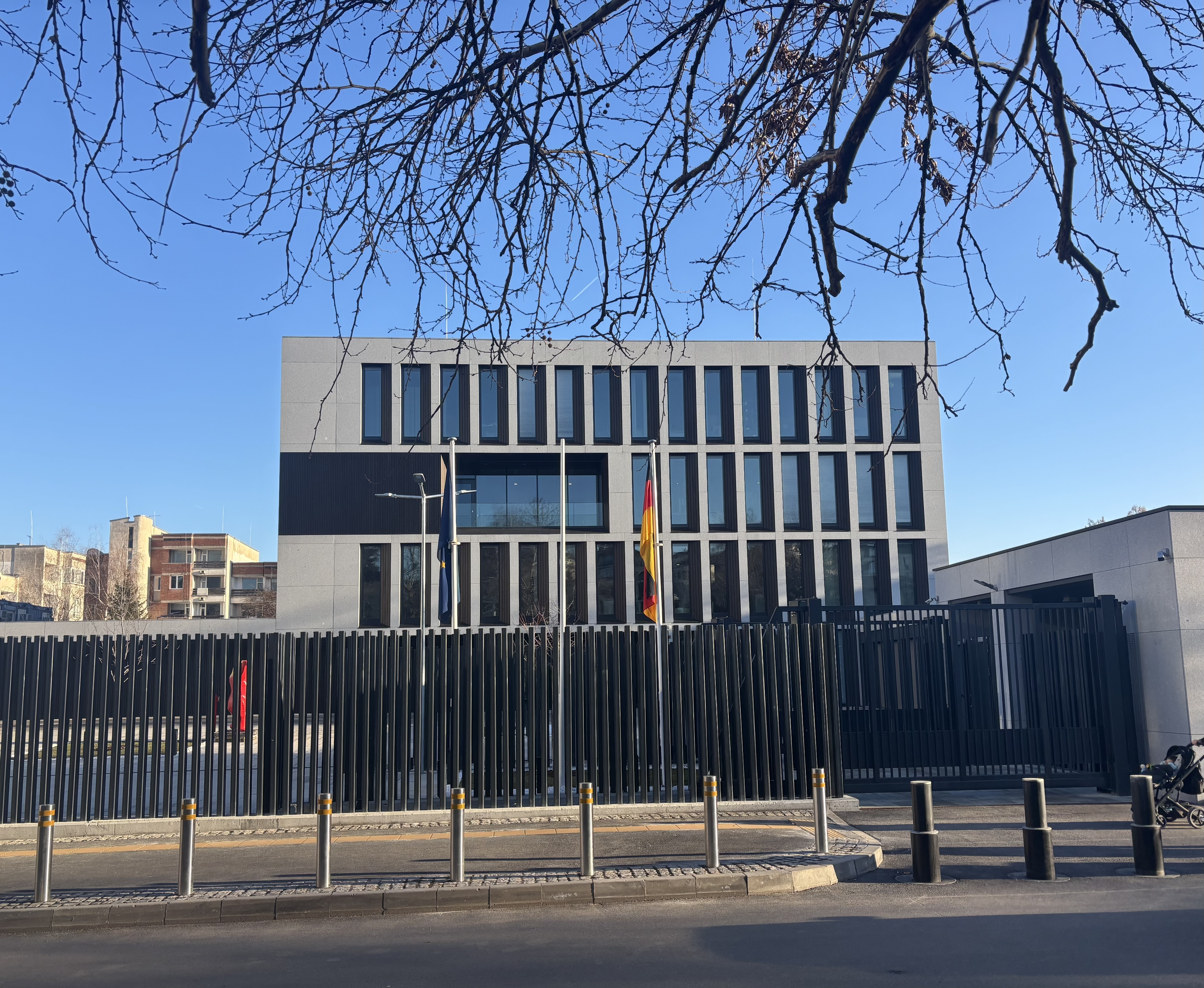
Embassy of Germany in Sofia

== See also ==
- Foreign relations of Bulgaria
- Foreign relations of Germany
- Bulgarian diaspora
- Bulgarians in Germany
- Germans in Bulgaria
- Accession of Bulgaria to the European Union
