= Brazil–Bulgaria relations =

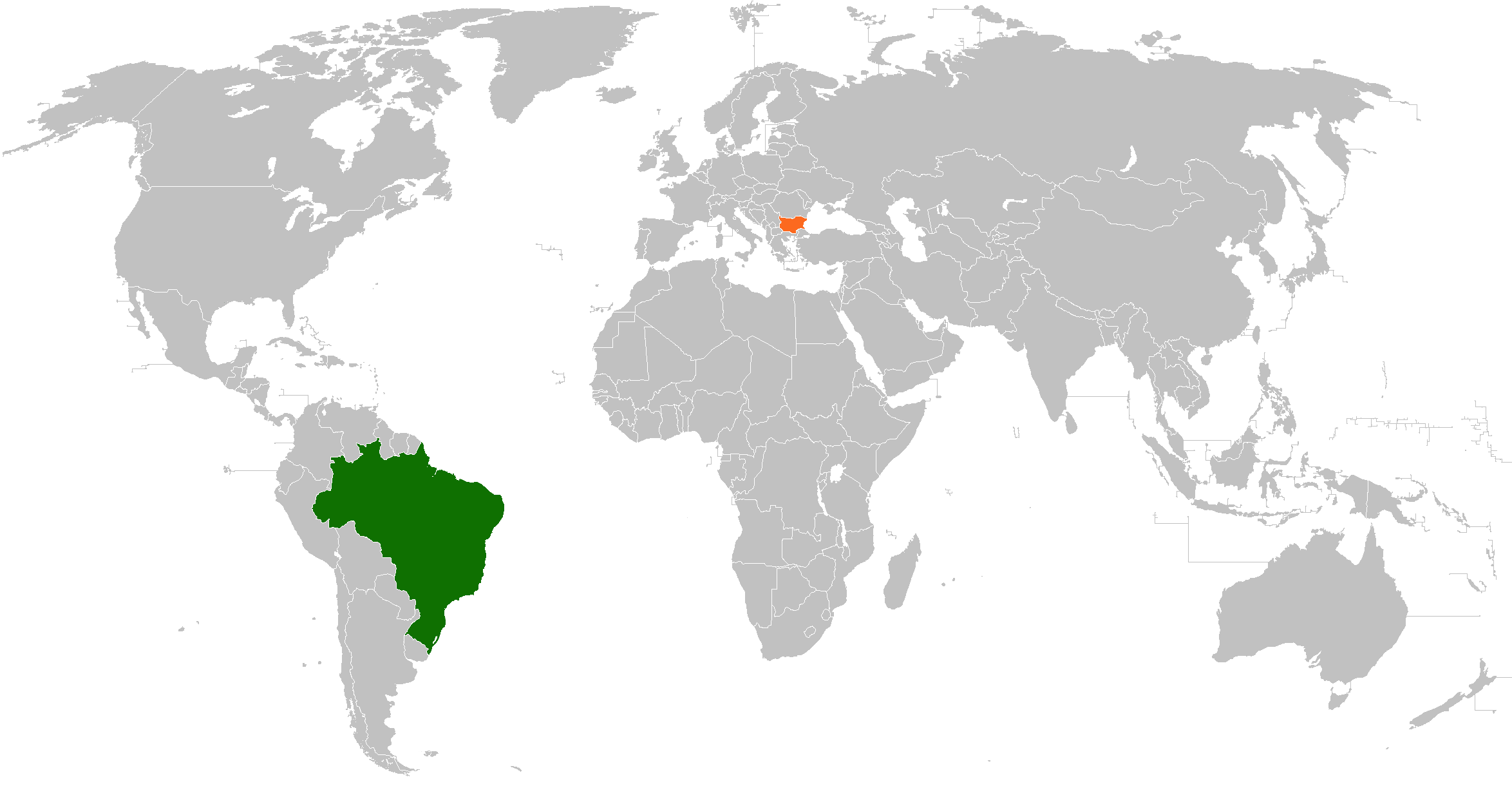

- Brazil: Bulgaria

The nations of Brazil and Bulgaria established diplomatic relations in 1934. Both nations are members of the United Nations and the World Trade Organization.

== History ==
In the early 1900s, most Bulgarian migrants arrived to Brazil escaping the wars between Russia and the Ottoman Empire, primarily in the Bessarabia region. It is estimated that 10,000 Bulgarians immigrated to Brazil during that time period.

Brazil recognized Bulgaria's independence from the Ottoman Empire on 5 May 1909. Diplomatic relations between both nations were formally established on 12 June 1934.

During World War II, both nations suspended diplomatic relations as each nation was on opposing sides during the war. In 1961, they re-established diplomatic relations and that same year Bulgaria opened its first diplomatic legation in Rio de Janeiro while Brazil opened a legation in Sofia in 1963. In 1974, both legations were upgraded to the status of embassies. In 1974, Vice-chairman of the Bulgarian Council of State, Mitko Grigorov, led a delegation to Brazil and met with President João Figueiredo.

In 2000, Bulgarian Foreign Minister Nadezhda Neynsky paid a visit to Brazil. In 2002, President Georgi Parvanov became the first Bulgarian head of state to visit Brazil. In 2011, Dilma Rousseff, daughter of a Bulgarian immigrant, became President of Brazil. Due to the occasion, Bulgarian Prime Minister Boyko Borisov attended President Rousseff's inauguration.

In 2011, Brazilian Foreign Minister Antonio Patriota paid a visit to Bulgaria. That same year in October, Brazilian President Rousseff paid an official visit to Bulgaria, becoming the first Brazilian head of state to visit the nation. During her visit, President Rousseff paid a visit to her father's birthplace in Gabrovo.

In June 2012, Bulgarian President Rosen Plevneliev paid a visit to Brazil to attend the United Nations Conference on Sustainable Development (Rio+20). President Plevneliev paid a second visit to Brazil in 2016 and both nations signed an Agreement on Economic Cooperation.

Both nations have closely cooperated in Antarctica, which has lasted for over 30 years, with the Bulgarian polar ship making technical stops in Brazilian ports on the continent; and the creation of the South Atlantic Whale Sanctuary. Both nations have also joined forces in environmental preservation and in promoting research in important areas such as climate, geology, marine biology, medicine and the atmosphere.

== High-level visits ==
High-level visits from Brazil to Bulgaria

- Foreign Minister Antonio Patriota (2011)
- President Dilma Rousseff (2011)

High-level visits from Bulgaria to Brazil

- Foreign Minister Nadezhda Neynsky (2000)
- President Georgi Parvanov (2002)
- Prime Minister Boyko Borisov (2011)
- President Rosen Plevneliev (2012, 2016)
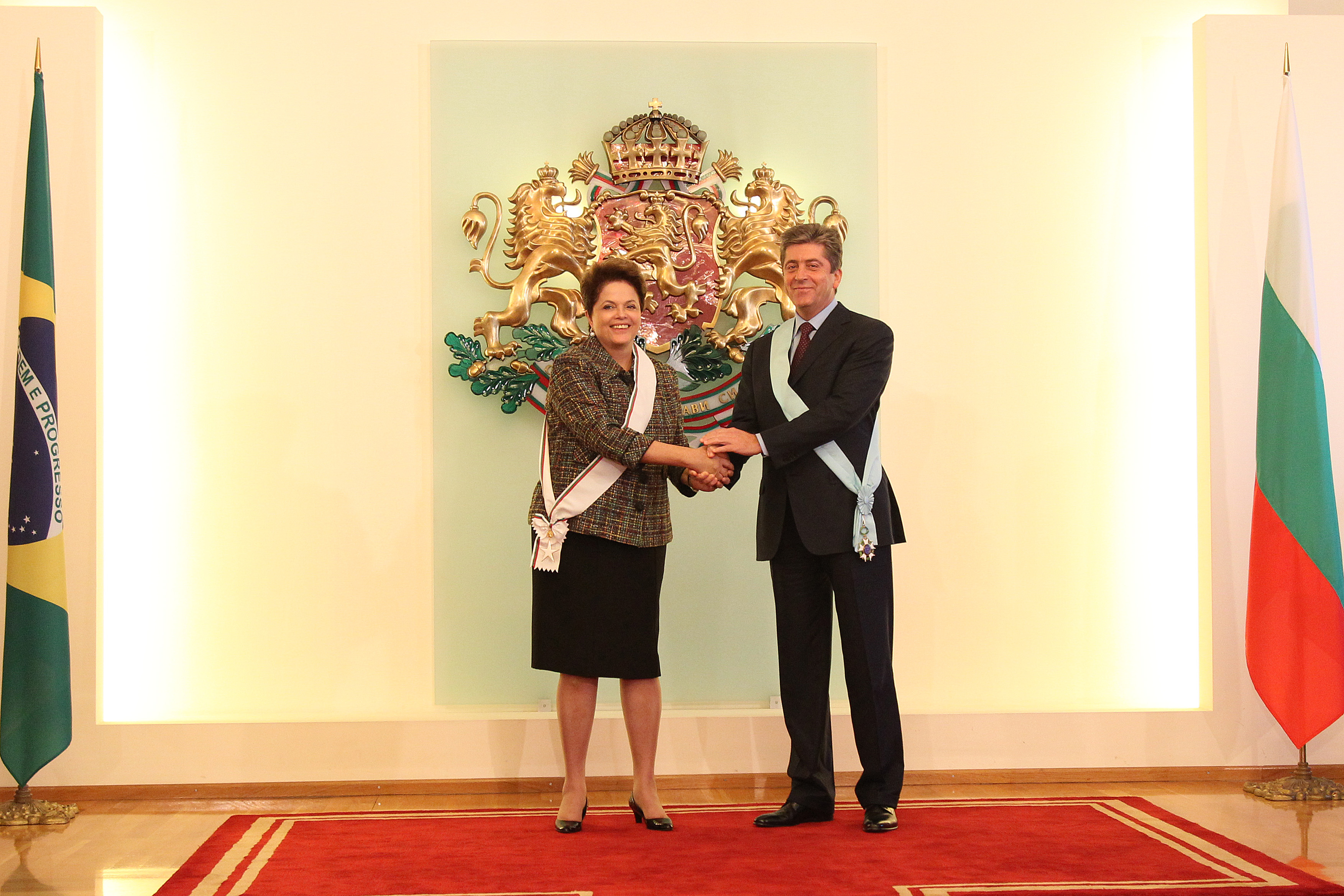
President Dilma Rousseff and President Georgi Parvanov in Sofia; 2011.

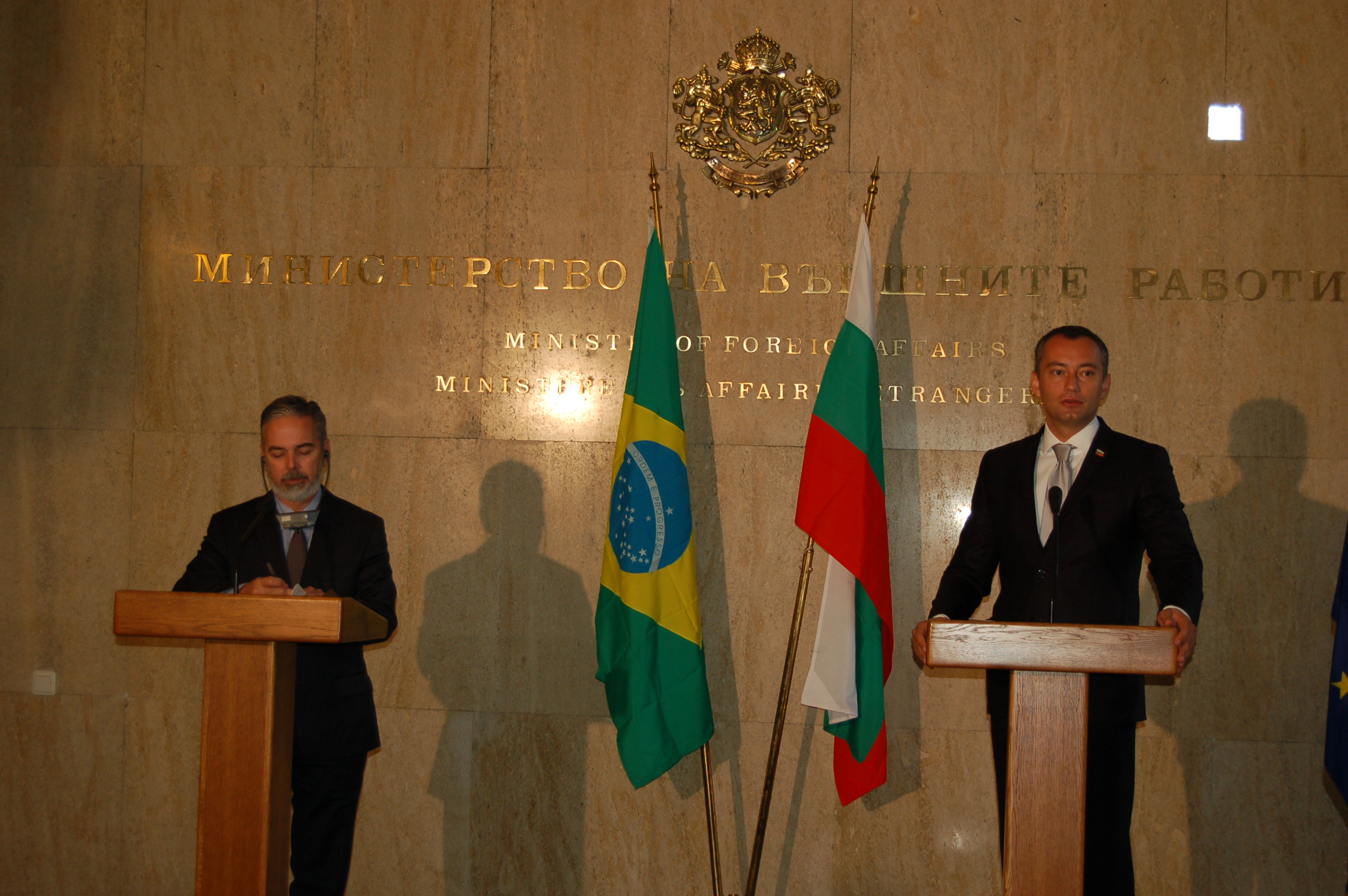
Foreign Minister Antonio Patriota and Foreign Minister Nickolay Mladenov in Sofia; 2011.

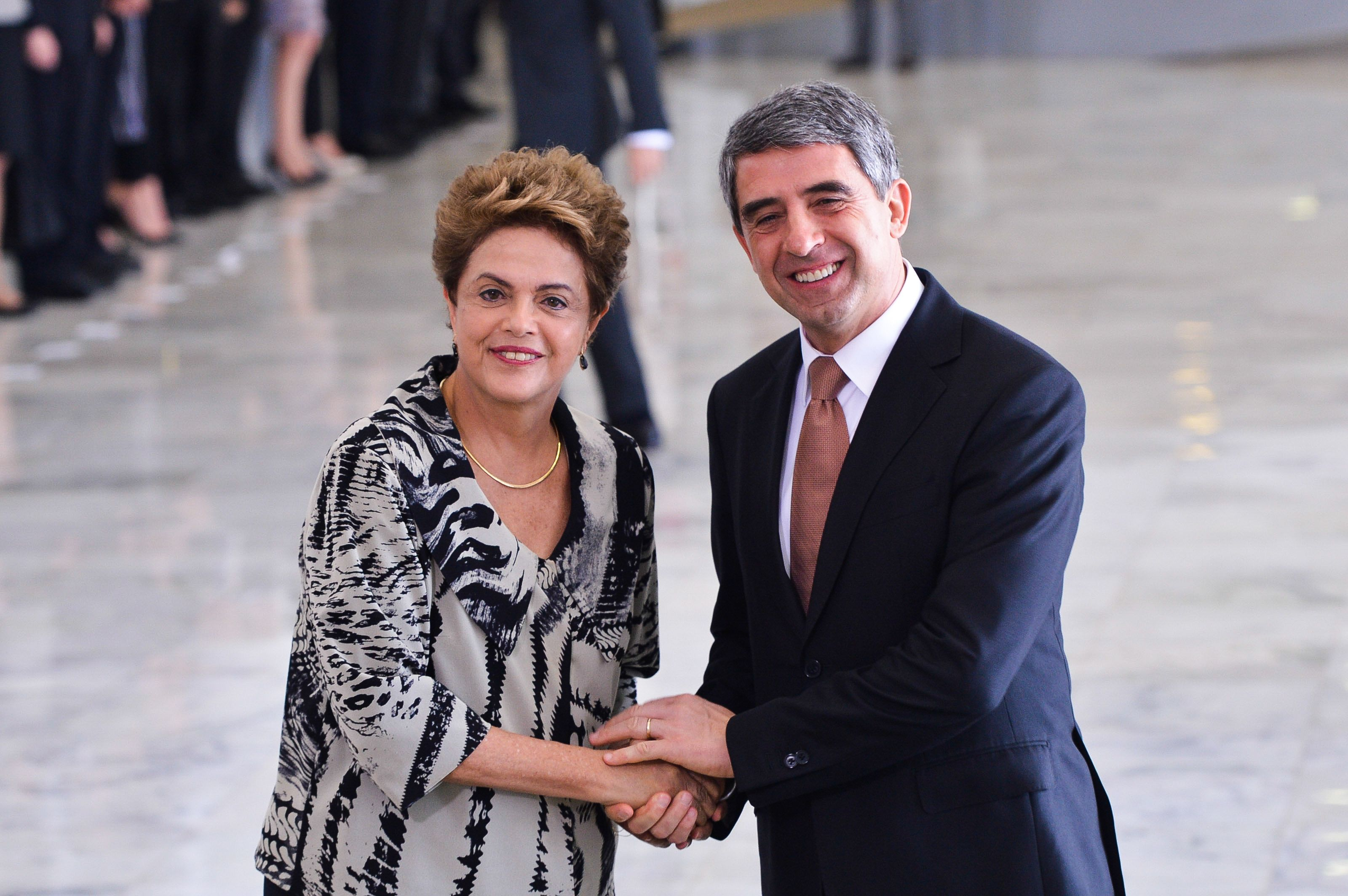
President Dilma Rousseff and President Rosen Plevneliev in Brasília; 2016.

== Trade ==
In 2024, bilateral trade between both nations totaled US$561.2 million. Both nations have prioritized strengthening trade and economic relations. Bulgaria has prioritizing focusing on efforts to attract Brazilian investment in high-tech manufacturing sectors, technology, research and innovation, as well as transport and infrastructure projects in Bulgaria.

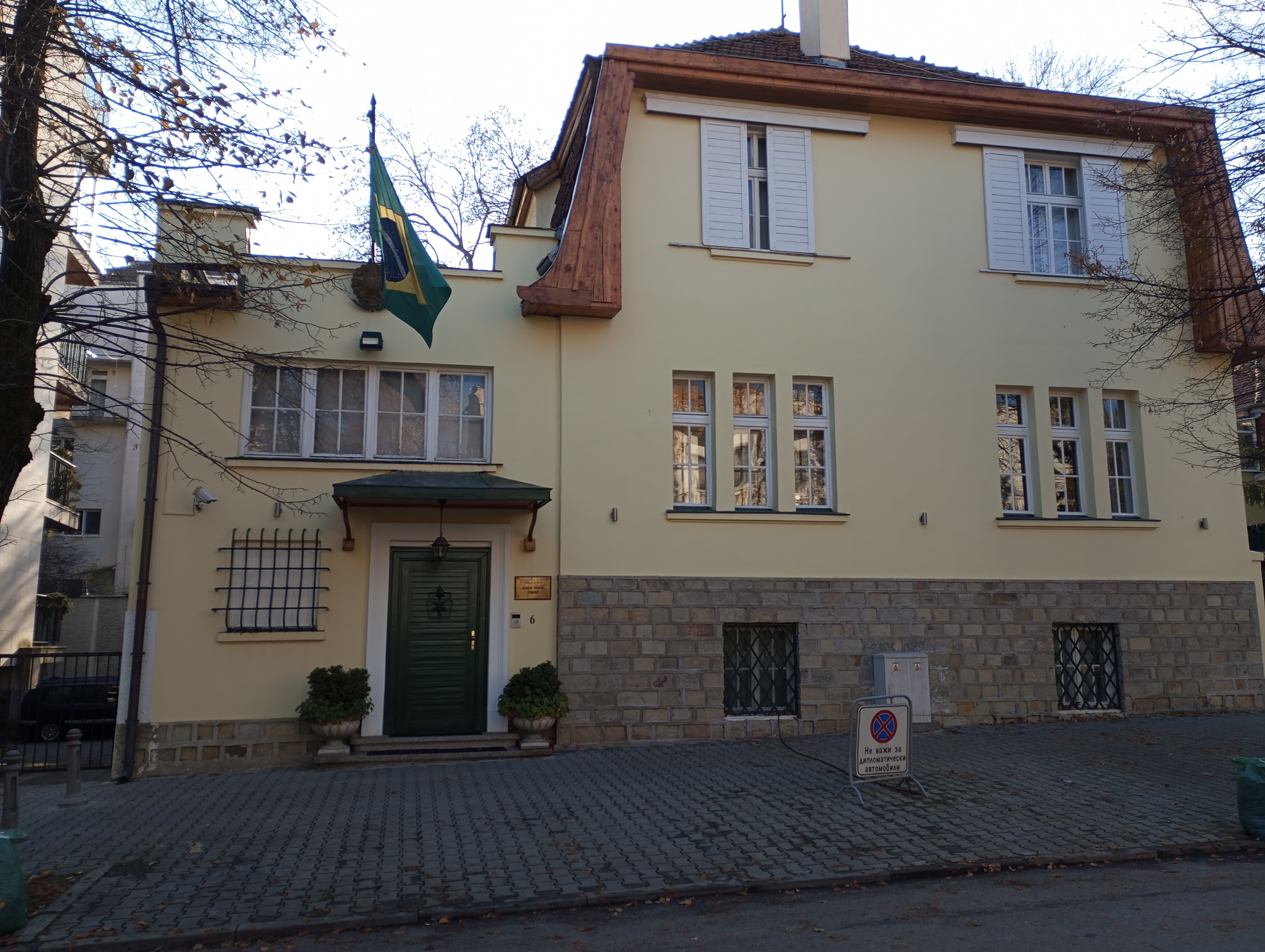
Embassy of Brazil in Sofia

== Resident diplomatic missions ==
- Brazil has an embassy in Sofia.
- Bulgaria has an embassy in Brasília.

== See also ==
- Bulgarian Brazilians
- Bulgarians in South America
- Foreign relations of Brazil
- Foreign relations of Bulgaria
