= Tsarev Brod =

Village in Bulgaria

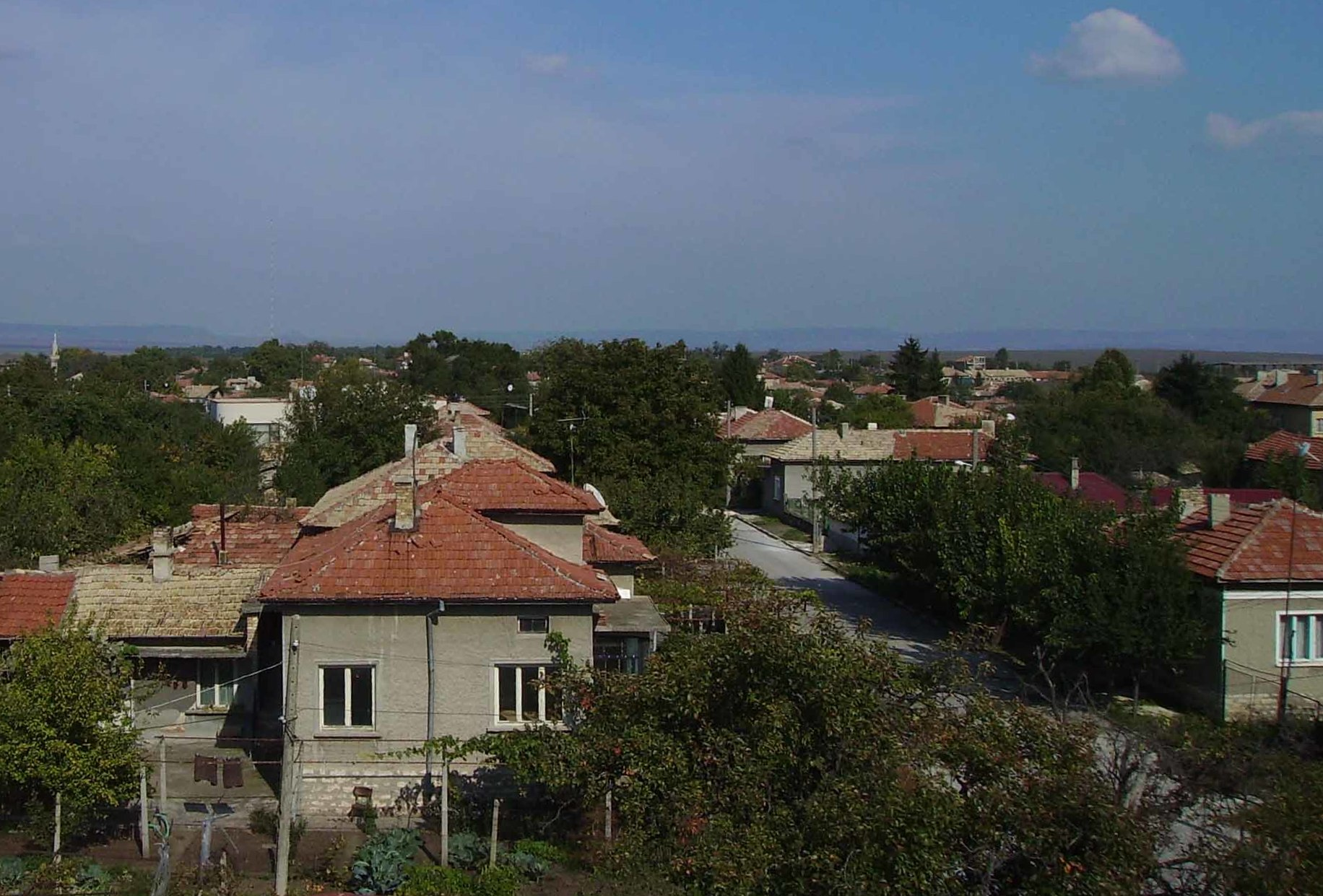
Tsarev Brod

Tsarev Brod (Bulgarian: Царев брод; also transliterated Carev Brod, Tzarev Brod, Zarev Brod, "royal ford") is a village in northeastern Bulgaria, part of Shumen municipality, Shumen Province. As of 2008, it has a population of 1,344 and the mayor is Stefan Zhivkov. The village lies at 43°20′N 27°01′E, 224 metres above mean sea level in the eastern stretches of the Danubian Plain. Until 1934, its name was Endzhe or Enidzhe (from Turkish: Yenice).

In the 1920s, Tsarev Brod had a diverse, even cosmopolitan population, including 50 German families, Bulgarians (with some Banat Bulgarians and some refugees from Macedonia), Tatars, Turks, Russians, Hungarians, Albanians and Armenians.

The Germans had come from what are today Ukraine (Molotschna/Halbstadt, Stepove/Karlsruhe), Romania (Valilej, Ianova/Margitfalva, Voiteg/Wojteg), Serbia (Ravni Topolovac/Katalinfalva, Novi Sad) and Hungary (Fegyvernek) beginning in the late 19th century, buying lots from Turks who were moving back to the Ottoman Empire. The Germans built a Roman Catholic church (1910), founded a Benedictine nunnery and a German-Bulgarian junior high school (1914). In the 1940s, the German community consisted of 74 families; however, the bulk of them were resettled to Germany according to Nazi Germany's Heim ins Reich policy. Only a few remained, such as the Hummel family residing in Shumen, as well as one or two nuns. The nunnery exists to this day, populated by a dozen nuns from Bulgaria, Germany, the Philippines, South Korea, Brazil, Poland and Namibia.

The only medieval Cuman stone figures discovered in Bulgaria were found near Tsarev Brod; they most likely date to the 12th century.
