= Germans in Bulgaria =

Ethnic group in Bulgaria

Немци в България (German: Bulgariendeutsche)

Total population
- 436 (2001 Bulgarian census)

Languages
- German · Bulgarian

Religion
- Roman Catholicism and Protestantism (i.e. Evangelical Lutheranism)

Related ethnic groups
- German diaspora

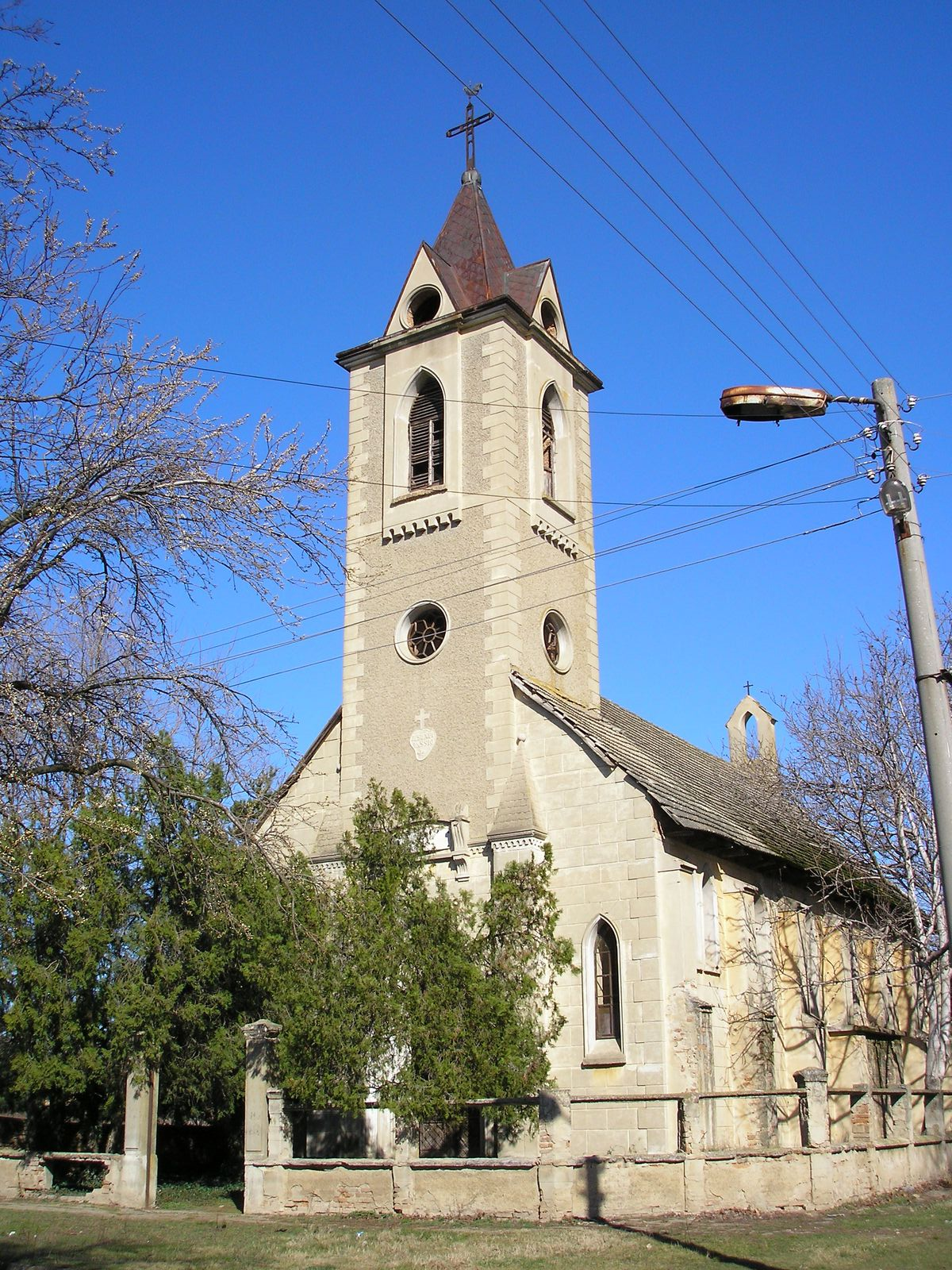
The German Roman Catholic church in Bardarski Geran, Vratsa Province

Germans (Bulgarian: немци, nemtsi or германци, germantsi) are a minority ethnic group in Bulgaria (German: Bulgarien). Although according to the 2001 census they numbered 436, the settlement of Germans in Bulgaria has a long and eventful history and comprises several waves, the earliest in the Middle Ages.

== Early settlement ==
Many Germans passed through Bulgaria during the eastern Crusades, as Bulgaria lies on the direct land route from Western and Central Europe to the Levant and the Holy Land. They were usually met with hostility as they were negatively disposed to the Orthodox population of the Byzantine Empire (which ruled Bulgaria at the time of the First and Second Crusades) and the Second Bulgarian Empire. Crusaders led by the Frankish noble Renier of Trit established the short-lived Duchy of Philippopolis around what is today Plovdiv, but in 1205 the Latins were routed by Kaloyan of Bulgaria in the Battle of Adrianople, their emperor Baldwin IX of Flanders was captured by the Bulgarians and died in Tarnovo. Kaloyan's daughter Maria was betrothed to the second Latin Emperor, Henry of Flanders, who she is thought to have poisoned.

Groups of Saxon ore miners (called саси, sasi in Bulgarian) are known to have settled in the ore-rich regions of Southeastern Europe. In the 13th-14th century, Germans from the Upper Harz and Westphalia settled in and around Chiprovtsi in modern northwestern Bulgaria (then part of the Second Bulgarian Empire) to extract ore in the western Balkan Mountains, receiving royal privileges from Bulgarian tsar Ivan Shishman. According to some theories, these miners established Roman Catholicism in this part of the Balkans before most of them left following the Ottoman conquest, the rest being completely Bulgarianized (by marrying Bulgarian women) and merging with the local population by the mid-15th century. Along with spreading Roman Catholicism, the Saxons also enriched the local vocabulary with Germanic words and introduced a number of mining techniques and metal-working instruments to Bulgaria.

Germans are also thought to have mined ore in the Osogovo and Belasica mountains (between Bulgaria and North Macedonia), as well as around Samokov in Rila and various parts of the Rhodope Mountains and around Etropole, but were assimilated without establishing Catholicism there.

== Liberated Bulgaria (post–1878) ==
Following the Liberation of Bulgaria in 1878 and its restoration as a sovereign monarchy, all four Bulgarian monarchs were of German descent: Prince Alexander I of Battenberg, as well as Ferdinand, Boris III and Simeon II, all three of Saxe-Coburg and Gotha. German intellectuals, such as architects Friedrich Grünanger and Viktor Rumpelmayer, arrived in Bulgaria to foster its cultural development.

Until World War II, there also existed a small but notable rural German population in several villages scattered in northern Bulgaria. Banat Swabians (part of the larger group of the Danube Swabians) from Austria-Hungary began to settle in the village of Bardarski Geran, Vratsa Province, beginning with seven families in 1893, with their total number later exceeding 90 families. In 1936, they numbered 282. In Bardarski Geran, the Germans built a separate Neo-Gothic Roman Catholic church around 1930 due to conflicts with the local Banat Bulgarians, who had founded the village in 1887. In 1932, a German school was established in Bardarski Geran. In its peak year, 1935, it had a total of 82 students, of whom 50 Germans and 32 Bulgarians.

Other Danube Swabian colonists from the Banat settled in another Banat Bulgarian village, Gostilya, Pleven Province, as well as in Voyvodovo, Vratsa Province, which they shared with Evangelist Czechs, Slovaks and Banat Bulgarians. Another notable German colony was Tsarev Brod (old name Endzhe), Shumen Province, founded before 1899, where the Germans lived with many other nationalities and had a private German school. In the beginning of the 20th century, it was inhabited by around 70 German families, and consisted of Dobrujan Germans, Bessarabia Germans and Banat Swabians. On the eve of World War II, Germans in Tsarev Brod constituted the bulk of the village's 420 Catholic parishioners.

A German community was also present in Southern Dobruja, a region before 1913 and since 1940 part of Bulgaria, and particularly in the village of Ali Anife (Kalfa), today Dobrevo, Dobrich Province, which was inhabited by Dobrujan Germans since 1903 and in 1943 still had 150 Catholics. It was briefly named Germantsi (“Germans”) in the 1940s. German sources list its population in 1939 as 285, of whom 129 Germans. Those colonists came from Kherson and Crimea (see Crimea Germans) in modern Ukraine. They built a church described as a "magnificent Catholic place of worship unmatched in the district"; the church was inaugurated on 23 October 1911.

Besides rural populations, Germans also settled in Bulgaria's larger cities as part of the group of the so-called "Lower Danubian Levantines", the Western and Central Europeans in the vibrant port and merchant cities of northern Bulgaria, such as Ruse, Varna, Veliko Tarnovo, Svishtov and Vidin. In the 1860s and 70s, the Austrian citizens in Ruse numbered 200–300. The first Bulgarian census in 1883 counted 476 Germans in Ruse alone, making them the fifth-largest ethnic group in that city.

The bulk of the German population in Bulgaria was resettled within the borders of the Third Reich according to Hitler's Heim ins Reich policy. As a result, 2,150 ethnic German Bulgarian citizens were deported from the country in 1943, including 164 from Bardarski Geran and 33 from Gostilya. Only a handful of Bulgaria's rural German population remained: for example, in 2003 there were only two elderly German women remaining in Bardarski Geran, Maria Dauerbach and Franziska Welsch; they had not been deported because they had married local Bulgarians.

== Notable people ==
- Joseph Oberbauer (1853–1926), Tyrolean-born painter and engineer
- Gustav Heinse (1896–1974), poet and translator (Bohemian German father)
- Ivan Stranski (1897–1979), physical chemist from Sofia (Baltic German mother)
- Edisson Jordanov (b. 1993), Footballer (German mother)
- Sophia Popov (b. 1992), American-born professional golfer
- Emilia Bayer (b. 1934), sculptor
- Paraskev Stoyanov (1871– 1941), anarchist, surgeon, historian and professor (German mother)
- Friedrich Grünanger (1856– 1929), architect
- Kilian Albrecht (b. 1973), skier

== See also ==
- Bulgaria–Germany relations
- Bulgarians in Germany
