= Ignat Kaneff =

Canadian businessman and philanthropist (1926–2020)

- Игнат Канев
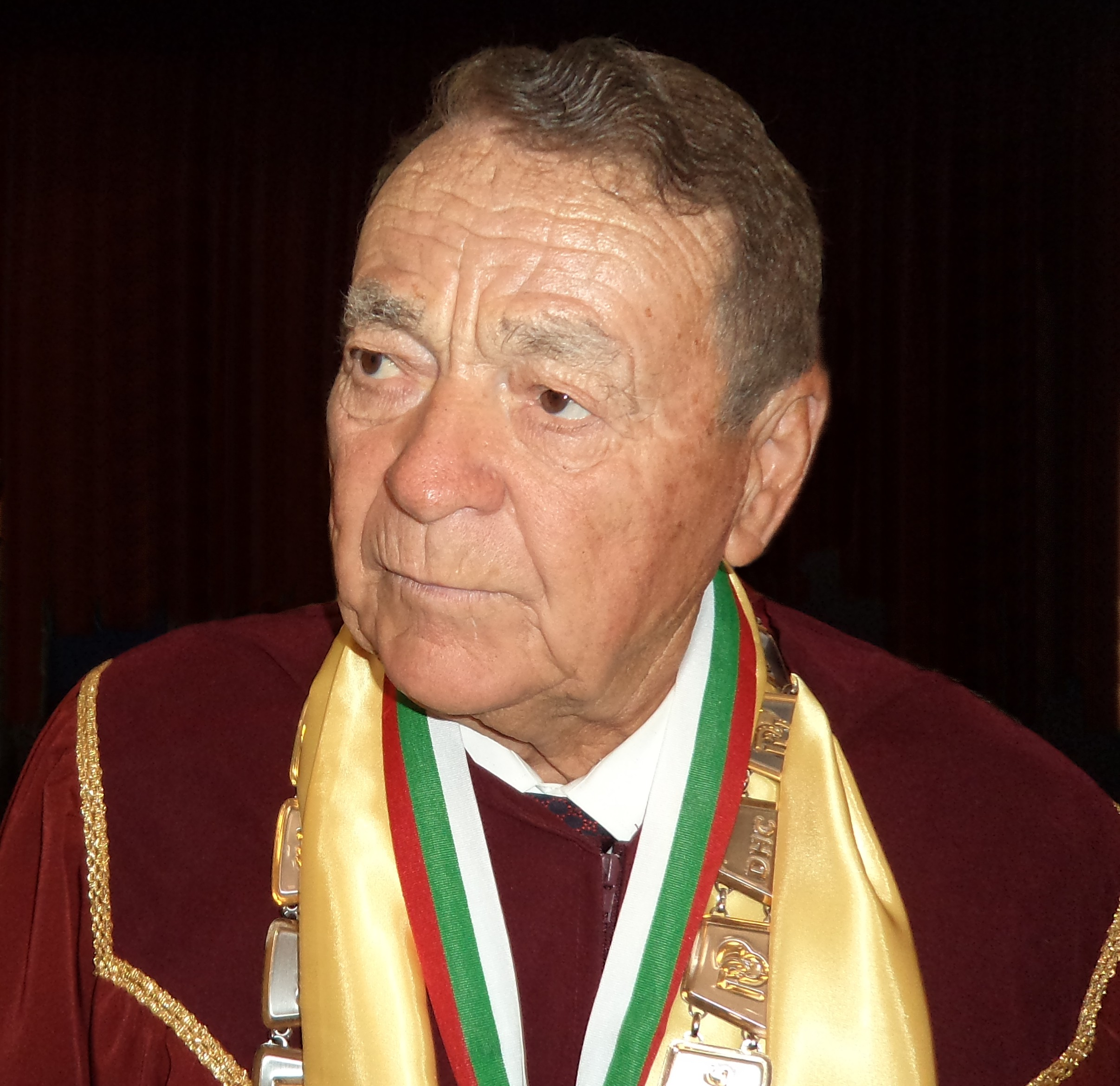
- Born: Игнат Христов Кънев; 6 October 1926; Gorno Ablanovo, Bulgaria
- Died: 12 July 2020 (aged 93)
- Occupation: Businessman
- Spouse: Dimitrina Kaneff
- Children: Anna-Maria and Kristina Kaneff and two children from previous marriage Heidi and Daniel Kaneff (Daniel is deceased).
- Website: kaneff.com

Ignat Kaneff CM OOnt (Bulgarian: Игнат Христов Кънев; 6 October 1926 – 12 July 2020) was a Bulgarian-Canadian business magnate and philanthropist.

== Biography ==
Ignat Hristov Kaneff was born on 6 October 1926 in Gorno Ablanovo, Bulgaria. He was one of six children in the family of Hristo and Mita Kanevi.

He could not afford to complete school, and left Bulgaria at the age of 14, moving to Austria to look for employment. Starting in March 1941, he and a few friends worked for a Bulgarian company that traded in agricultural products.

In 1951 he quit work in Austria, and emigrated to Canada. He settled in Toronto and started working in the construction business. Originally, he built small houses for newly arrived immigrants. Five years later, in 1956, he founded his first construction company. The next year, his company constructed its first large building – three floors with nine apartments. Ten years later, the company built its first high-rise building, with 262 apartments. Subsequently, the company's annual revenue reached more than 250 million dollars. During his career as a building contractor, he built thousands of houses, many public buildings, and high-end golf facilities.

He was also involved in the car trade. He became a General Motors dealer, becoming successful enough to be invited by the president of the company to dinner in Detroit.

He was the owner of six golf courses and a large construction company in Canada. He was the managing director of a charitable foundation bearing his name. His wealth at the time of his death was estimated to be over $1 billion. He owned 7 Apartment Buildings, over 5 Golf Clubs and had an empire of real estate properties across North America from condos to houses, to strip malls and plazas.

He was the Honorary Consul of Bulgaria in Canada.

Ignat Kaneff died on 12 July 2020.

== Philanthropy ==
Kaneff made grants primarily for health and educational purposes and to promote the Bulgarian Orthodox Church. He made his first major donation in 1955 for a hospital in Toronto. He donated land and over $1 million for construction of the St. Dimitar Bulgarian Orthodox Church in Brampton.

Kaneff donated $1 million to the University of Toronto Mississauga and the Kaneff Centre was named in his honour in 1992.

In 2009, he donated $2.5 million towards the reconstruction of the Osgoode Hall Law School at York University in Toronto; the building was named after him. In 2012, he gave $1.5 million, about half the total amount necessary, for the construction of a modern conference complex named after him, the Kaneff Centre, at Ruse University in Bulgaria. The Kaneff Centre was officially opened on 10 October 2013.

Kaneff Tower and the Ignat Kaneff Building at York University are named in his honour.

== Honours ==
In 2002, Kaneff was awarded the Bulgarian Order "Stara Planina first degree".

In 2010 Kaneff was awarded the Order of Ontario. For the generous sponsorship and building renovations of Osgoode Hall Law School in 2010, York University awarded him the honorary Doctor of Juridical Science.

For the sponsorship of Kaneff Centre in Bulgaria in 2013, Ruse University awarded him the honorary Doctor of Science.

In December 2016, Kaneff was named a Member of the Order of Canada.

In 2016, Kaneff was one of the recipients of the Top 25 Canadian Immigrant Awards presented by Canadian Immigrant Magazine.

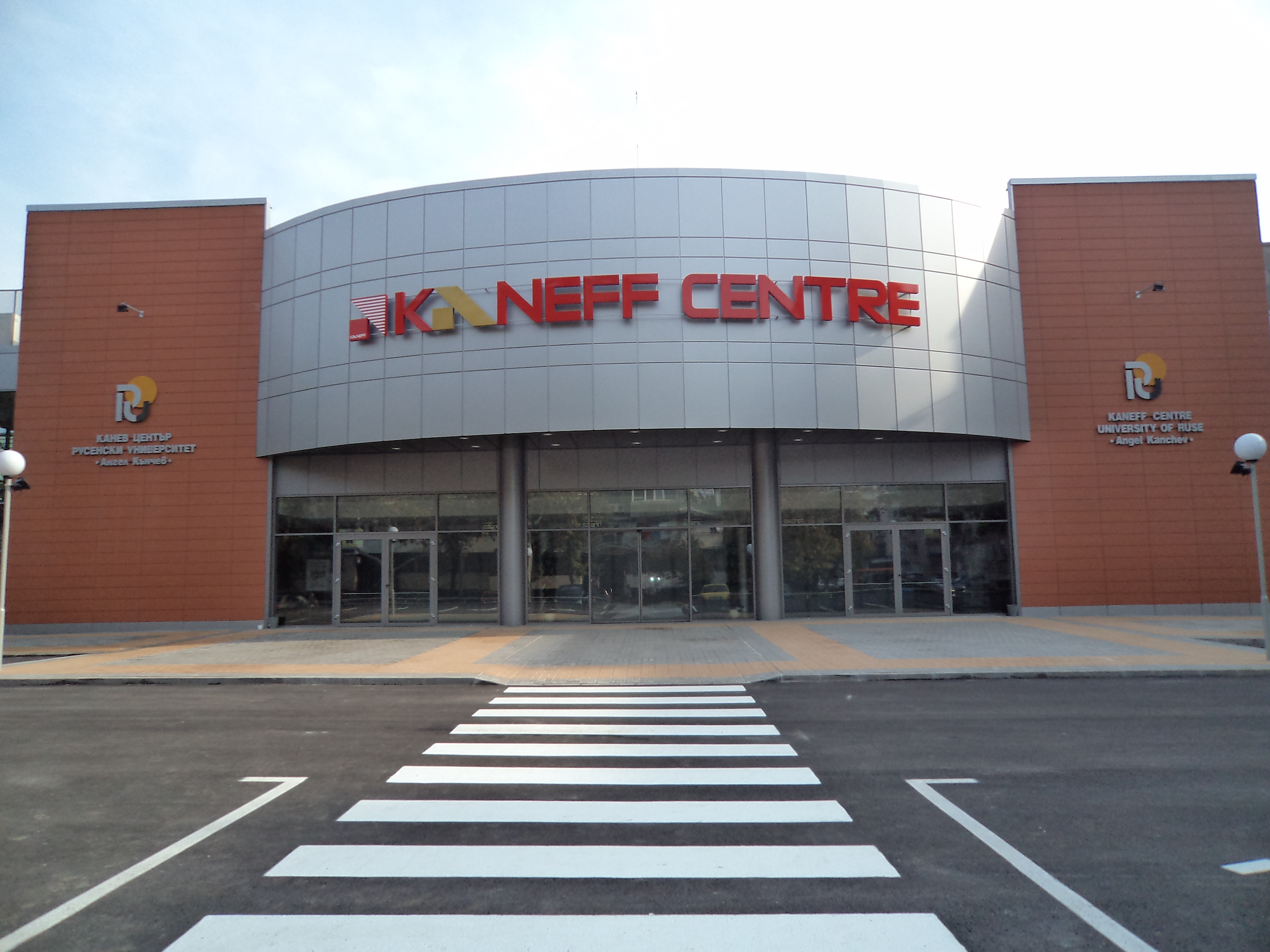
Kaneff Centre at Ruse University

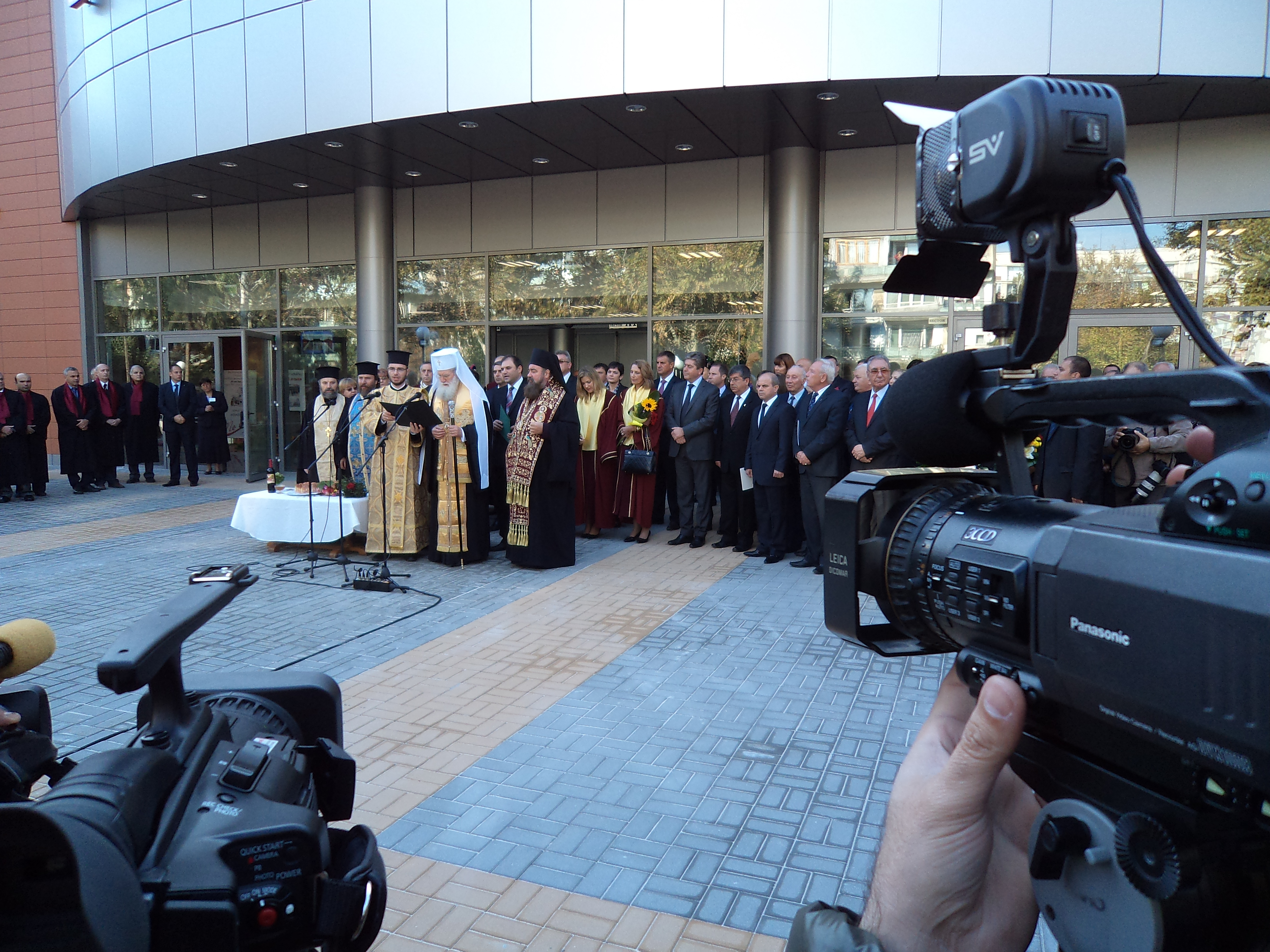
Opening of Kaneff Centre

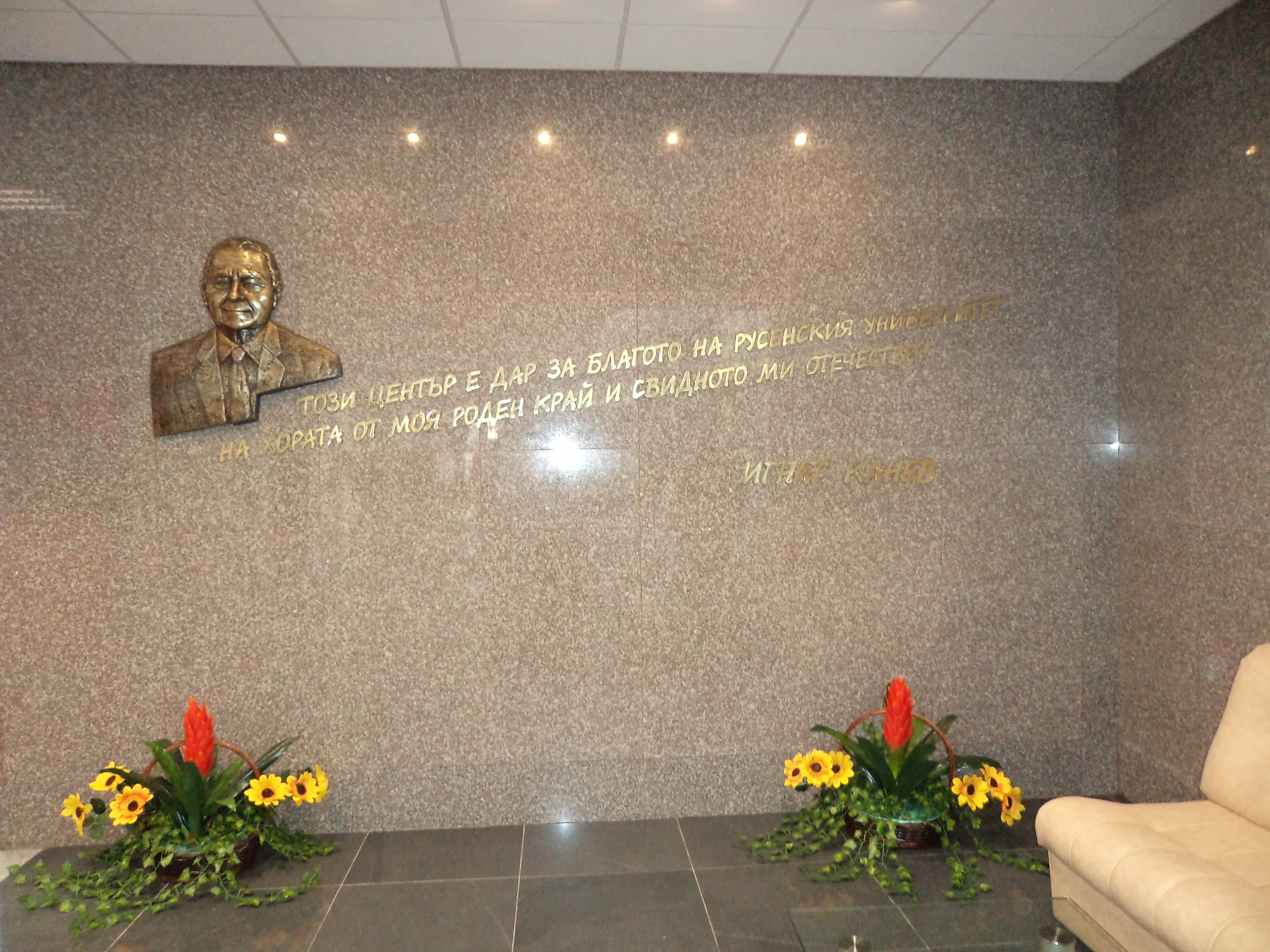
Bas-relief of the donor Ignat Kaneff at Kaneff Centre
