= Bulgarian Brazilians =

Bulgarian Brazilians Búlgaro-brasileiro · бразилци българи
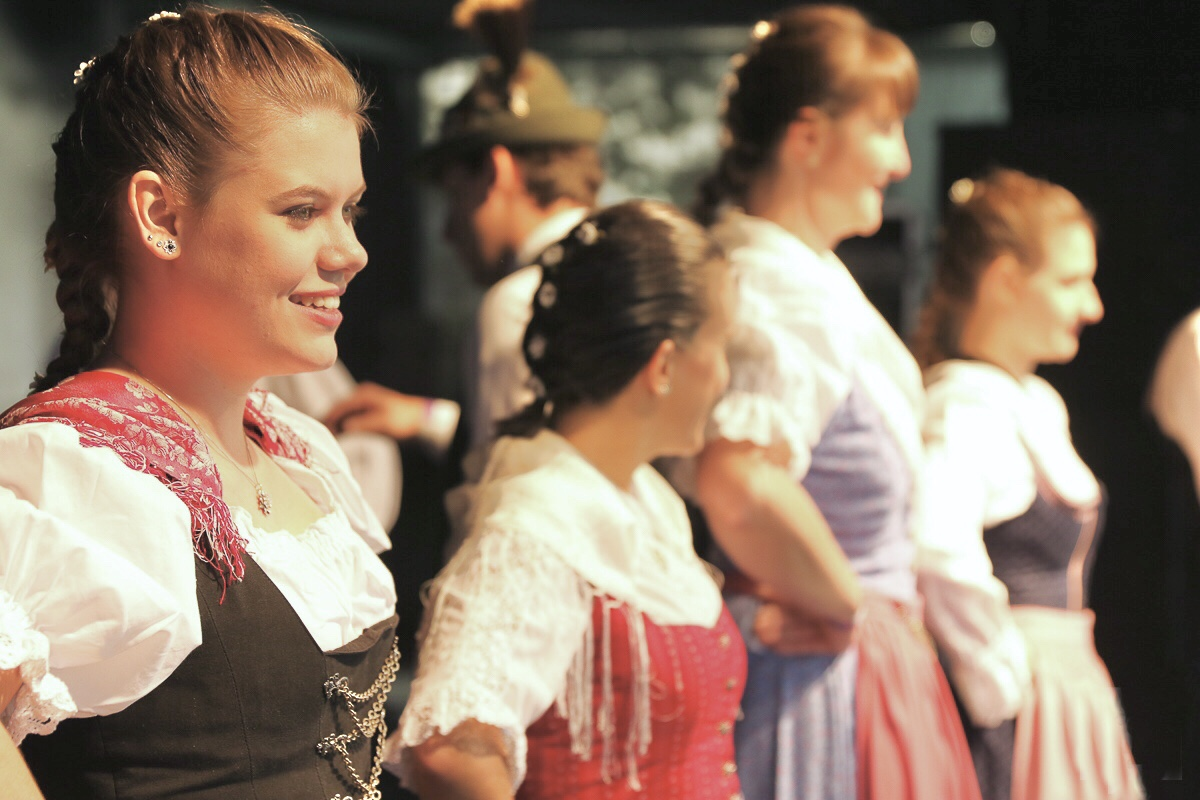
- Bulgarian descendants in São Paulo.

Total population
- 62,000-65,000

Regions with significant populations
- Brazil

Languages
- Predominantly Portuguese. Some also speak Bulgarian

Related ethnic groups
- Other White Brazilians, Bulgarians

Bulgarian Brazilians (Portuguese: búlgaro-brasileiros, Bulgarian: бразилци българи, Braziltsi Bŭlgari) are Brazilian citizens who are fully, partially or predominantly of Bulgarian descent or are Bulgarian-born people residing in Brazil.

According to 2011 estimates, there are around 65,000 Bulgarians or people of Bulgarian descent currently living in Brazil.

== Notable Bulgarian Brazilians ==
The most notable Brazilian citizen of Bulgarian origin is Dilma Rousseff, former and first female president of Brazil. Her father, Pétar, was born in Gabrovo and, as a member of the Bulgarian Communist Party in the 1920s, he was forced to flee Bulgaria in 1929 due to political persecution. Rousseff's win during the 2010 presidential election sparked excitement in Bulgaria.

Another Brazilian citizen of Bulgarian origin is André Bankoff, Brazilian actor. He is descendant of the Romani minority in Bulgaria through his grandfather Angel Bankoff.

The Brazilian self-taught artist Antonio Peticov is a descendant of Bulgarian emigrants.

Demi Getschko, a Brazilian computer scientist and considered one of the pioneers of the Internet in Brazil, is the son of immigrants: Greek father and Bulgarian mother.

== See also ==
- Brazil–Bulgaria relations
- Bulgarian diaspora
- Immigration to Brazil
