= Bulgarians in South America =

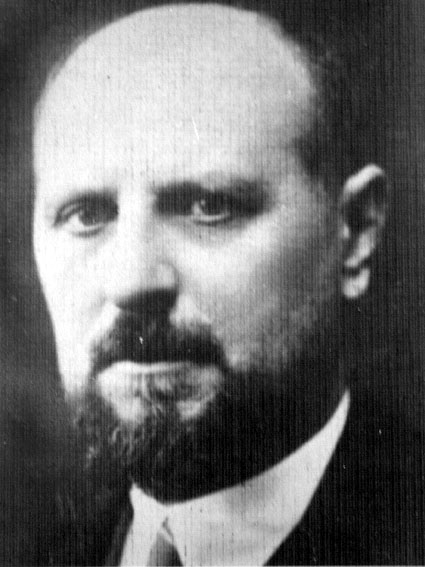
- Aleksandar Tsankov, Bulgarian politician

Total population
- roughly 300,000

Regions with significant populations
- Argentina, Uruguay, Brazil

Languages
- Spanish, Portuguese, Bulgarian

Religion
- Bulgarian Orthodox, Roman Catholic, other Christian. Judaism is practiced by Bulgarian Jews.

Related ethnic groups
- Bulgarian people, other White Argentines, White Brazilians, Bulgarian Canadians, Bulgarian Americans etc.

Bulgarians (Spanish and Portuguese: búlgaros) have been settling in South America (Bulgarian: Южна Америка, Yuzhna Amerika) as economic emigrants since the late 19th century. Their presence has been documented in Uruguay since 1905, in Argentina since 1906 and in Brazil since the early 20th century.

== History and distribution ==
The Bulgarian diaspora in South America is strongest in Argentina, where 200,000 people of Bulgarian descent are thought to live, the diaspora itself assessing its size to be at least 250,000. However, according to official data, only around 3,000 people have declared Bulgarian nationality in Argentina. Bulgarians mainly live in Buenos Aires, Berisso, Mar del Plata, Presidencia Roque Sáenz Peña, Las Breñas and Comodoro Rivadavia. The most significant wave of emigration was in the 1920s, following World War I, when over 20,000 Bulgarians (mostly from northern Bulgaria: around Veliko Tarnovo, Lovech, Pleven, Vratsa and Targovishte) settled in Argentina. Some of them formed a compact community in the agricultural Chaco Province, introducing the first tractor to Chaco.

According to estimates, 1,800–5,000 Bulgarians live in Brazil, chiefly in Rio de Janeiro, São Paulo, Porto Alegre and Belo Horizonte, including many Bessarabian Bulgarians and some Bulgarian Jews and Bulgarian Armenians. The most famous Brazilian of Bulgarian origin is President Dilma Rousseff from the Workers' Party. Her father Pétar was born in Gabrovo and, as an active member of the Bulgarian Communist Party in the 1920s, had to flee from Bulgaria in 1929 due to political persecution. Rousseff's wide margin over her rivals sparked a "Dilma fever" in Bulgaria. Although she does not speak Bulgarian she said in an interview that she does feel like a Bulgarian to a certain extent. During her state visit to Bulgaria, on October 5, 2011, Rousseff was awarded Bulgaria's highest state honour, the Order of Stara Planina.

A notable Bulgarian diaspora also exists in Uruguay, numbering around 2,000. Most Bulgarians in this country live in Montevideo, with some in Fray Bentos, Punta del Este, Maldonado, Durazno and Rocha. In the late 1920s, there were around 4,000 Bulgarians in Uruguay.

A smaller number of Bulgarians have also settled in Chile (today around 150, mostly in Santiago), Venezuela (today around 130), Peru, Paraguay and Colombia.

Among Bulgarians are Banat Bulgarians from Romania, Aromanians and Megleno-Romanians who became adjusted to South American, and Latin American, society because of the linguistic similarities between Romanian, Aromanian, Megleno-Romanian, Spanish, and Portuguese, as well as Latin identity of Aromanians and Megleno-Romanians, and Banat Bulgarians are predominantly Roman Catholic.

== Notable figures ==
- Sasha Aneff (b. 1991), Uruguayan footballer
- Luis Bacalov (b. 1933), Academy Award-winning Argentine composer
- María Sonia Cristoff (b. 1965), Argentine writer
- Stephan Doitschinoff (b. 1977), Brazilian plastic artist
- Iván Drenikoff, Venezuelan scholar
- Alphonse Emanuiloff–Max, Uruguayan political scientist, journalist and honorary consul
- Fabián Estoyanoff (b. 1982), Uruguayan footballer
- Juan Carlos Bacileff Ivanoff, Argentine politician, governor (2013–) and vice-governor of Chaco Province (2007–13)
- Jorge Kurteff (b. 1916), Argentine metal sculptor
- Jorge Lazaroff (1950 – 1989), Uruguayan composer
- Miguel and Juan Lazaroff, founders of Uruguayan football club Danubio F.C. (named after the Danube River)
- Luis Petcoff Naidenoff (b. 1967), Argentine politician, senator
- Luben Petkoff (1933-1999), Venezuelan politician and entrepreneur
- Teodoro Petkoff (1932-2018), Venezuelan politician and former government minister
- Miguel Rojas Naidernoff (b.1989), Venezuelan baseball player
- Dilma Rousseff (b. 1947), President of Brazil
- Carlos Tenev (1941 – 1997), Argentine politician, senator (1988–1989) and deputy (1993–1997)
- Florencio Tenev (1929 – 1999), Argentine politician, governor of Chaco Province (1983–1987)
- João Cláudio Todorov (b. 1941), Brazilian psychologist, former rector of the University of Brasília
- Aleksandar Tsankov (1879 – 1959), Bulgarian right wing politician who spent the last 10 years of his life as an exile in Argentina
- Jaime Yankelevich (1896 – 1952), Argentine radio mogul who introduced television in Argentina
- Claudia Sheinbaum (b.1962), President of Mexico

== See also ==
- Bulgarian diaspora
- Bulgarian Brazilians
- Immigration to Argentina
- Immigration to Brazil
