= Dimitar Inkiow =

Bulgarian writer (1932–2006)

Dimitar Janakiew Inkiow
- Born: 10 October 1932; Haskovo, Bulgaria
- Died: 24 September 2006 (aged 73); Munich, Bavaria, Germany
- Occupation: Writer

Dimitar Janakiew Inkiow (Bulgarian: Димитър Янакиев Инкьов; Haskovo, 10 October 1932 – Munich, 24 September 2006) was a Bulgarian writer.

He studied mining engineering and later in Sofia's Drama Academy, where he was graduated as drama director. He wrote several theatrical plays before having to leave the country in 1965 for problems he had with the government. He moved to Germany (Munich) until 1991 and was script writer for Radio freies Europa (Radio Free Europe) in Munich.

He wrote more than 100 books which have been translated to more than 25 languages, like his famous saga "Ich und meine Schwester Klara" ("Me and My Sister Clara")

== Works ==
1. Die Puppe die ein Baby haben wollte / Куклата, която искаше да си има бебе, 1974
2. Geheimformel 101 Planet der kleinen Menschen. Franz Schneider Verlag, München 1978. ISBN 3-505-07828-X
3. Das fliegende Kamel und andere Geschichten. Franz Schneider Verlag, München 1979. ISBN 3-505-07911-1
4. Miria und Räuber Karabum, 1974
5. Der kleine Jäger, 1975
6. Transi Schraubenzieher, 1975
7. Transi hat'ne Schraube locker, 1976
8. Reise nach Peperonien, 1977
9. Ich und meine Schwester Klara/ Аз и моята сестра Клара. Erika Klopp Verlag, Berlin 1977, ISBN 3-7817-0882-9
10. Ich und Klara und der Kater Kasimir/ Аз, Клара и котаракът Казимир. Erika Klopp Verlag, Berlin 1978, ISBN 3-7817-0883-7
11. Ic
12. Ich und Klara und das Pony Balduin, 1979
13. Ich und Klara und der Papagei Pippo, 1981
14. Ich und Klara und der Dackel Schnuffi. Erika Klopp Verlag, Berlin 1978, ISBN 3-7817-0884-5
15. Ich und Klara und das Pony Balduin. Erika Klopp Verlag, Berlin 1979, ISBN 3-7817-0885-3
16. Ich und Klara und der Papagei Pippo. Erika Klopp Verlag, Berlin 1981, ISBN 3-7817-0886-1
17. Ich und meine Schwester Klara. Die schönsten Geschichten. Klopp, München 1989. ISBN 3-7817-0887-X
18. Ich und meine Schwester Klara. Die lustigsten Tiergeschichten. Klopp, München 1994. ISBN 3-7817-0888-8
19. Kunterbunte Traumgeschichten, 1978
20. Planet der kleinen Menschen, 1978
21. Klub der Unsterblichen, 1978
22. Das Geheimnis der Gedankenleser, 1979
23. Der grunzende König, 1979
24. Das fliegende Kamel, 1979
25. Der versteckte Sonnenstrahl, 1980
26. Fünf fürchterliche Raubergeschichten, 1980
27. Eine Kuh geht auf Reisen, 1981
28. Leo der Lachlöwe, 1981
29. Leo der Lachlöwe im Schlaraffenland,1982
30. Ich, der Riese, und der Zwerg Schnips, 1981
31. Ich, der Riese, und der große Schreck, 1982
32. Der Hase im Glück, 1982
33. Maus und Katz, 1983
34. Kleiner Bär mit Zauberbrille, 1983
35. Ein Igel im Spiegel, 1984
36. Hurra, unser Baby ist da,1984
37. Hurra, Susanne hat Zähne, 1985
38. Die fliegenden Bratwürstchen, 1985
39. Meine Schwester Klara und die Geister,1982
40. Meine Schwester Klara und der Löwenschwanz,1982
41. Meine Schwester Klara und die Pfütze, 1982
42. Meine Schwester Klara und der Haifisch, 1983
43. Meine Schwester Klara und ihr Schutzengel,1983
44. Meine Schwester Klara und der Schneemann,1984
45. Meine Schwester Klara und ihr Geheimnis, 1984
46. Meine Schwester Klara und das liebe Geld, 1985
47. Meine Schwester Klara und die große Wanderung, 1985
48. Meine Schwester Klara und ihre Kochlöffel, 1986
49. Meine Schwester Klara und das Lachwürstchen, 1987
50. Die Karottennase, 1986
51. Was kostet die Welt – Geschichten ums Geld /История на парите/, 1986
52. Erzähl mir vom Fliegen, 1986
53. Erzähl mir vom Wasser. Die Abenteuer von Plimp und Plomp,1986
54. Erzähl mir von der Erde. Eine Geisterreise um die Welt, 1987
55. Erzähl mir vom Rad. Wie das Rad ins Rollen kam, 1987
56. Peter und die Menschenzähnefresser, 1987
57. Gullivers wundersame Reise auf die Insel Liliput,1987
58. Meine Schwester Klara und der Osterhase, 1988
59. Susanne ist die Frechste, 1988
60. Die Katze fahrt in Urlaub, 1988
61. Erzahl mir von der Sonne.Ein Sonnenstrahl auf großer Fahrt,1988
62. Meine Schwester Klara und die geschenkte Maus, 1988
63. Meine Schwester Klara und der Piratenschatz, 1988
64. Der singende Kater. Neue Maus- und Katzengeschichten, 1989
65. Meine Schwester Klara und Oma Müllers Himbeeren, 1989
66. Das Buch erobert die Welt, 1990
67. "Inkiow's schönstes Lesebuch", 1990 /1993
68. Pipsi und Elvira. Ganz neue Katz- und Maus-Geschichten, 1990
69. Meine Schwester Klara und ihre Mäusezucht, 1990
70. Ich und meine Schwester Klara.Die schönsten Geschichten,1989
71. Meine Schwester Klara ist Umweltschützerin, 1990
72. Ich hab dich ganz stark lieb, Susanne, 1990
73. Mein Opa, sein Esel und ich, 1990
74. Das kluge Mädchen und der Zar, 1990
75. Herkules, der stärkste Mann der Welt (Griechische Sagen), 1991
76. Die Katze läßt das Mausen nicht (Fabeln nach Aesop),1991
77. Ein Kater spielt Klavier, 1991
78. Ich bin Susannes großer Bruder, 1991
79. Inkiows schlaues Buch fur schlaue Kinder, 1991
80. Das Buch vom Fliegen, 1991
81. Das sprechende Auto,1992
82. Meine Schwester Klara und der lustige Popo, 1992
83. Filio der Baum, 1992
84. Meine Schwester Klara ist die Größte! 1992
85. Der Widder mit dem goldenen Fell, 1992
86. Wie Siegfried den Drachen besiegte. Europäische Sagen,1993
87. Ist die Erde rund? Geschichten fur Neugierige, 1993
88. Der Prinz mit der goldenen Flöte. Schulbuch fur Klassensatze),1993
89. Der bebrillte Rabe, 1993
90. Antonius wird Mauspatenonkel,1993
91. Meine Schwester Klara und das große Pferd, 1993
92. Hund und Floh – Die hüpfenden Gäste, 1993
93. Wie groß ist die Erde?, 1993
94. Die Gänse, der Fuchs und der Luchs, 1994
95. Meine Schwester Klara erzählt Witze, 1994
96. Das Abc-Zauberbuch, 1994
97. Der großte Esel, 1994
98. Das Krokodil am Nil, 1994
99. Lustige Abc Geschichten, 1994
100. Ich und meine Schwester Klara – Die lustigsten Tiergeschichten,1994
101. Meine Schwester Klara und das Fahrrad, 1995
102. Das Kaninchen und der Frosch, 1995
103. Das Mädchen mit den viereckigen Augen,1995
104. Meine Schwester Klara stellt immer was an, 1995
105. Die Glücksschweine/Eine Maus im Haus, 1996
106. Die fliegende Schildkrote, 1996
107. Die Abenteuer des Odisseus, 1999
108. Orpheis, Sysiphos und &, 2001
109. Aespos Fabeln, 1999
110. Ein wunderschöner, schlechter Tag, 2001
111. Krokodilbauchbesichtigung, 2001
112. Achtung! Menschenzähnefresser, 2003
113. Klara und Ich in Amerika, 2003
114. Die Bibel fur Kinder, 2003
115. Aesops Fabeln oder Die Weisheit der Antike, 2004
116. Велко Верин – Фейлетони, 2000 – CD
117. Ботуш Каишев и другите, 2003, ISBN 978-954-91241-8-7
118. Ботуш Каишев и новото време, 2004

CD:

- Ilias. Igel Records. Nominierung für den Deutschen Hörbuchpreis 2006.
- Die Abenteuer des Odysseus. Igel Records.
- "Die Heldentaten des Herkules". Igel Records.
- Griechische Sagen I. Igel Records.
- Griechische Sagen II. Igel Records.
- Griechische Sagen III. Igel Records.
- Aesops Fabeln. Igel Records.
- Die Götter des Olymp. Igel Records.
- Die Katze lässt das Mausen nicht. Igel Records.
- Die Bibel – Das alte Testament. Igel Records.
- Die Bibel – Das neue Testament. Igel Records.
