= Alexandra Fol =

Bulgarian-Canadian composer

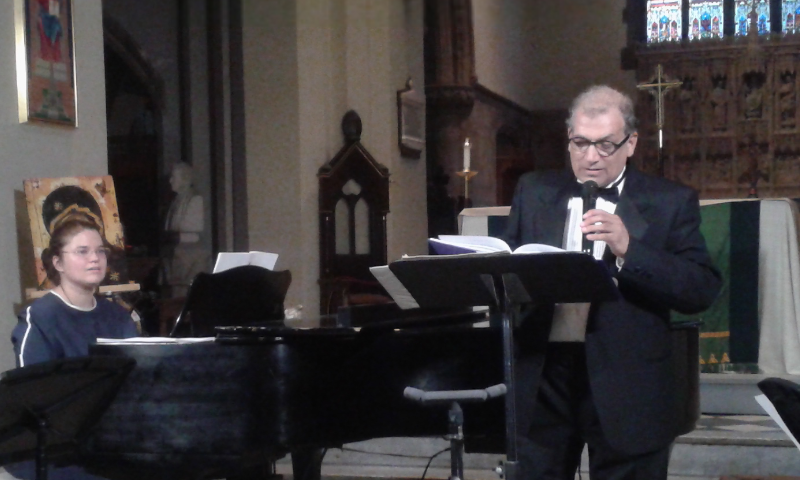
Alexandra Fol au l'église chrétienne de la Cathédrale

Alexandra Fol (born July 11, 1981 in Sofia, Bulgaria) is a Bulgarian-Canadian composer who resides in Montreal, Quebec, Canada.

== Career ==
Fol has composed more than 40 works in different mediums, which have been performed by ensembles such as Sofia Philharmonic Orchestra, the orkest de ereprijs, Ossia New Music, the New Fromm players, the thingNY ensemble, the Young Artists Orchestra, McGill University Orchestra, and others.

Fol's works have been performed by the Orchestre Symphonique de Montreal, the Sofia Philharmonic, the New Score Chamber orchestra, among others. In 2005 she was one of four composers commissioned to write a children's work for the 70th anniversary of the Montréal Symphony Orchestra's Children's series. "Pegasus", op. 37 was performed throughout the 2005-2006 season and included in an educational CD for children. Important performances of her works include the premiere of her "Two Songs for Voice and Orchestra" by one of the Tokyo Symphony Orchestras in 1994 and the premiere of her Concerto for Violinon a 16 c. Storioni violin by Leonid Iogansen and the Boston University Orchestra in 2001.

Fol teaches composition for the "Vermont MIDI Project". She was a finalist for the 2006 Gaudeamus International Composers Award and a 2007 Tanglewood Music Center composition fellow, and is recipient of grants by the Canada Council for the Arts and the Bulgarian Ministry of Culture among others.

Fol studied composition at Boston University, the Eastman School of Music and McGill University. Her principal teachers include "Richard Cornell". Archived from the original on 2011-06-28. and John Rea.

Fol is currently organist and director of music at St. James United Church in Montréal.

== Selected works ==
Orchestra:

"One Day God Will Return" for chamber orchestra, 2008

"Requiem no. 2", op. 40, 2006

"Pegasus", op. 37, 2005

Concerti for solo and orchestra:

"A Swan song for the Impossible Love" for Bass clarinet and chamber orchestra, 2004

Viola concerto no. 2, 2002

Violin concerto, 2001

Viola concerto no. 1, 1999

Piano concerto, 1999

Chorus and orchestra:

"Requiem no. 1", op. 19, 2001

Stage:

Incidental music for Macbeth, 2007

"In the name of... a Cantata", 2004

"Cinderella, the fairy tale", 2003

Chamber music

"Sics", 2009

"Happy memories" for violin, 2008

"Be/alls" for percussion, 2008

String quartet no. 2, 2006

Brass Quintet, 2005

"Frenzi" for piano and clarinet, 2003

String quartet no. 1, 1999

== Publications ==
Beauty and Perfection - an Eternal Artistic Paradox

== Arms ==
Coat of arms of Alexandra Fol
Notes Granted 15 January 2019 Crest A rank of organ pipes proper encased Gules, charged at the corners with red oak leaves Or, overall a musical stave bearing the first notes of Alexandra Fol’s Piece for Piano in E minor, all issuant from a wreath of St. John’s Wort flowers proper. Escutcheon Or on a pile throughout Gules a Pegasus rampant holding a sun in splendour Or. Motto NUMQUAM CEDIMUS Badge The organ and musical stave from the Crest proper irradiated Or.
