= University of Ruse =

Public university in Ruse, Bulgaria

"Angel Kanchev" University of Ruse
- Русенски университет „Ангел Кънчев“
- Type: Public
- Established: 1945
- Affiliations: EUA
- Rector: Prof. Gencho Popov
- Academic staff: 486
- Administrative staff: 243
- Students: ~10,000
- Location: 8 Studentska Str., 7017 Ruse, Bulgaria, Ruse, Bulgaria; 43°51′16″N 25°58′13″E
- Campus: Urban
- Website: www.uni-ruse.bg

"Angel Kanchev" University of Ruse (Bulgarian: Русенски университет „Ангел Кънчев“) is a public university in the city of Ruse, Bulgaria. The university was formed on 21 July 1995 by the dissolution of Higher Institute of Mechanical Engineering, Mechanisation and Electrification of Agriculture (Bulgarian: Висш институт по машиностроене, механизация и електрификация на селското стопанство) which was commonly known as (Bulgarian: ВИММЕСС) with establishment date 12 November 1945. This was the first national higher technical school outside the Bulgarian capital.

The University of Ruse employs 31 professors, 177 docents and another 85 assistants with Doctor of Science qualification.

The tradition and the geography of the University of Ruse determine its mission and its strategic role of an educational, scientific and intellectual center of the Ruse region and northeast Bulgaria on the national and the international levels. The university has two subsidiaries structures in the cities of Silistra and Razgrad.

University of Ruse was selected by the European Commission for the TEMPUS program of 18 universities from 11 Central European countries that have achieved the best results in the transformation of higher education. It is a regular member of the European Universities Association (EUA) and of the Danube Rectors' Conference (DRC). It participates in CEEPUS, SOCRATES / ERASMUS and LEONARDO DA VINCI programs. International approval is to confirm that he built and developed as a modern university with European level of education. Due to the implementation of the credit system, the university has been conferred the ECTS label.

== Faculties ==
- Agrarian and Industrial Faculty
- Faculty of Mechanical and Manufacturing Engineering
- Faculty of Electrical engineering, Electronics and Automation
- Faculty of Transport
- Faculty of Business and Management
- Faculty of Natural Sciences and Education
- Faculty of Law
- Faculty of Public Health and Health care
