= Bulgarian diaspora =

People of Bulgarian heritage who live outside Bulgaria

Map of the Bulgarian diaspora in the world (includes people with Bulgarian ancestry or citizenship). Bulgaria + 100,000 + 10,000 + 1,000

The Bulgarian diaspora includes Bulgarians living outside Bulgaria and its surrounding countries, as well as immigrants from Bulgaria abroad.

The number of Bulgarians outside Bulgaria has sharply increased since 1989, following the Revolutions of 1989 in Central and Eastern Europe. Over one million Bulgarians have left the country, either permanently or as a temporary workforce, leading to a marked decline in its population. Many took advantage of the US green card lottery system. Also, many Bulgarians immigrated to Canada using the advantage of the Canadian immigration point system for skilled workers. Others went across the European Union. In countries such as Germany and Spain where many Bulgarians work and stay there intermittently, while retaining Bulgaria as their permanent residence. This trend increased following the 2007 enlargement of the European Union, when Bulgaria became a European Union member state.

Most of the causes for the spread of the post-1990s Bulgarian diaspora throughout the EU member states and North America have been related to work and education. Therefore, the majority of the emigrants have been allowed residence in other countries on skilled worker or student basis. That includes people of various skills - lower education workers (which usually deal with utilities and housekeeping), plumbers, construction workers, gardeners, handymen, maids, as well as a substantial amount of higher-education specialists - usually from the areas of engineering, computer science, chemistry and medicine.

The largest communities of the Bulgarian diaspora in the Western part of the European Union are in Spain, Germany, France and Italy.

Other places that attracted Bulgarian immigration are Australia, New Zealand, South America (especially Argentina and Brazil), South Africa, and some expats in United Arab Emirates.

The numbers of Bulgarians living abroad has been reported in vastly different numbers by varying groups such as the government and various NGOs, leading to some criticism.

== Politics ==
=== 2024 ===
Winning party by abroad countries

=== 2023 ===
Constituency	GERB–SDS	PP–DB	Revival	DPS	BSPzB	ITN	BV	The Left!	Others
Bulgarian nationals abroad	8.4%	26.9%	16.7%	36.6%	2.1%	5.2%	1.1%	0.9%	3.3%
source: Electoral Commission of Bulgaria

=== 2022 ===
Constituency	GERB–SDS	PP	DPS	Revival	BSPzB	DB	BV	ITN	Others
Bulgarian nationals abroad	8.8%	22.8%	31.8%	14.5%	2.1%	10.0%	2.0%	4.7%	3.3%
source: Electoral Commission of Bulgaria

=== November ===
Constituency	PP	GERB–SDS	DPS	BSPzB	ITN	DB	Revival	Others
Bulgarian nationals abroad	22.4%	7.3%	39.2%	2.3%	11.0%	7.9%	6.2%	3.7%

==== April ====
Constituency	GERB–SDS	ITN	BSPzB	DPS	DB	ISMV	VMRO	Others
Bulgarian nationals abroad	8.66%	30.75%	6.52%	13.17%	17.56%	4.24%	1.57%	17.53%
Source: CIK

== See also ==
- Bulgarians
- List of Bulgarians
- Bulgarian Americans
- Bulgarian Canadians
- Bulgarians in South America
- Bulgarian Australian
- Bulgarians in Croatia
- Bulgarians in France
- Bulgarians in Germany
- Bulgarians in Serbia
- Bulgarians in the United Kingdom
- Banat Bulgarians
- Bessarabian Bulgarians
- Macedonian Bulgarians
- Bulgarian Eastern Orthodox Diocese of the USA, Canada and Australia
