= Bulgarians in Ukraine =

болгари bolhary

Total population
- 204,574 (2001)

Regions with significant populations
- Odesa Oblast: 150,683 (2001)
- Zaporizhzhia Oblast: 27,764 (2001)
- Mykolaiv Oblast: 5,614 (2001)
- Donetsk Oblast: 4,833 (2001)
- other regions of Ukraine: 15,680 (2001)

Languages
- Bulgarian (94%), Russian (60%), Ukrainian (55%)

Religion
- Of the total Of the religious

Related ethnic groups
- Bessarabian Bulgarians

Bulgarians in Ukraine (Bulgarian: Българи в Украйна, Bǎlgari v Ukrayna; Ukrainian: Болгари в Україні, Bolhary v Ukraïni) make up the fifth biggest minority in the country and primarily reside in southern Ukraine. Bulgarians make up a significant minority of the Odesa Oblast, especially the city of Bolhrad.

== Location and number ==
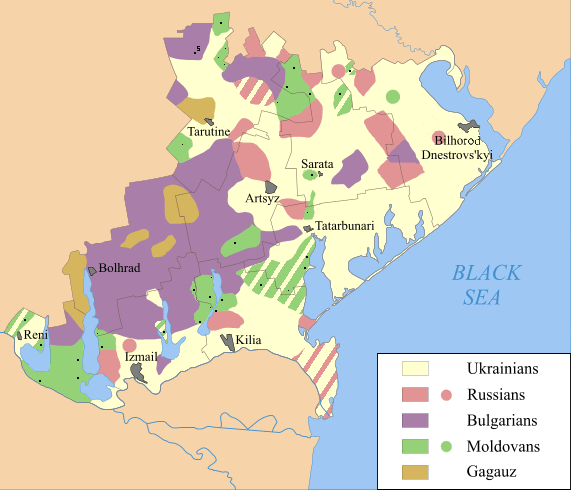
Bulgarian-inhabited areas in Budjak (purple)

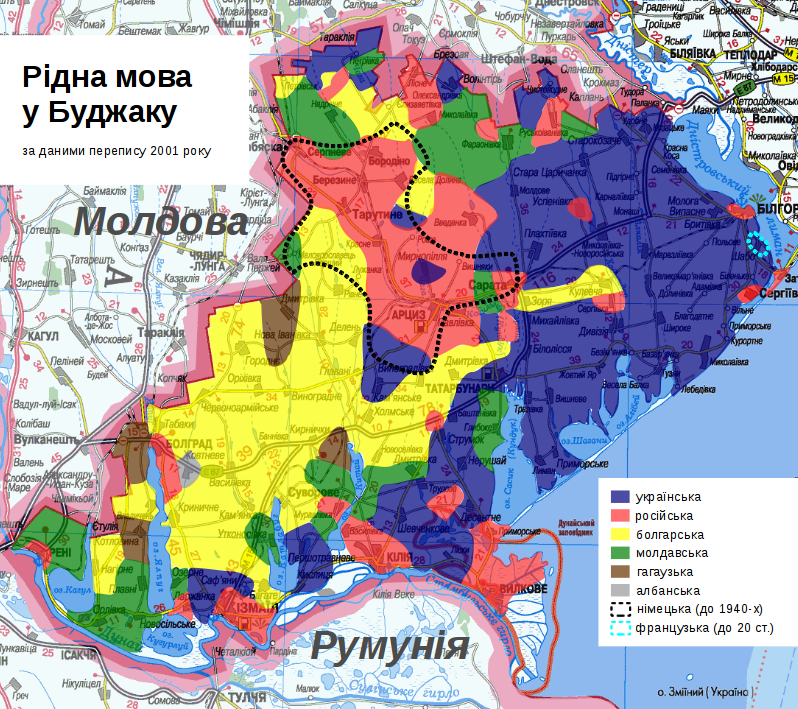
By language (2001)

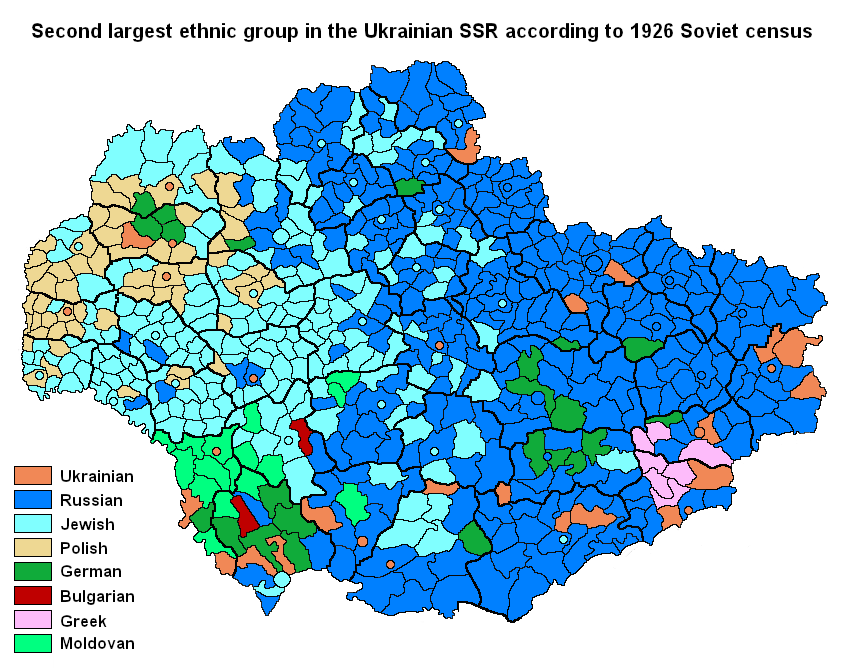
Second largest ethnic groups according to the 1926 census (dark brown paints Bulgarians)

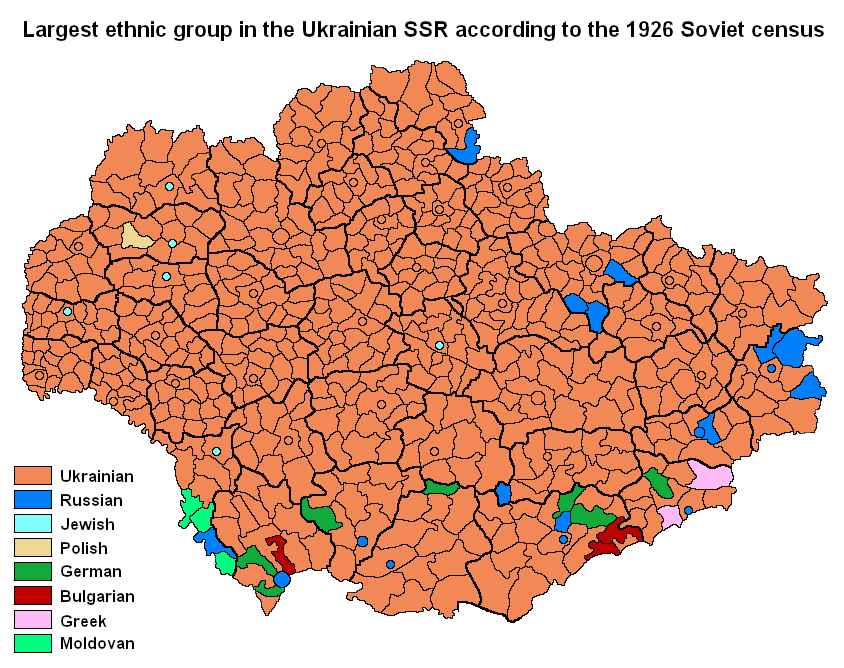
Largest ethnic groups according to the 1926 census (dark brown paints Bulgarians)

In Ukraine, the number of Bulgarians is estimated at over 140,000 (the 2001 Ukrainian Census counted a total of 204,600 Bulgarians which includes an undetermined number of more recent emigrants). Bulgarians comprise the majority in Bolhrad Raion and are prevalent in the historic regions of Budjak and throughout the southern part of the country. Many Bulgarians have moved to Odesa, the regional capital, in recent years.

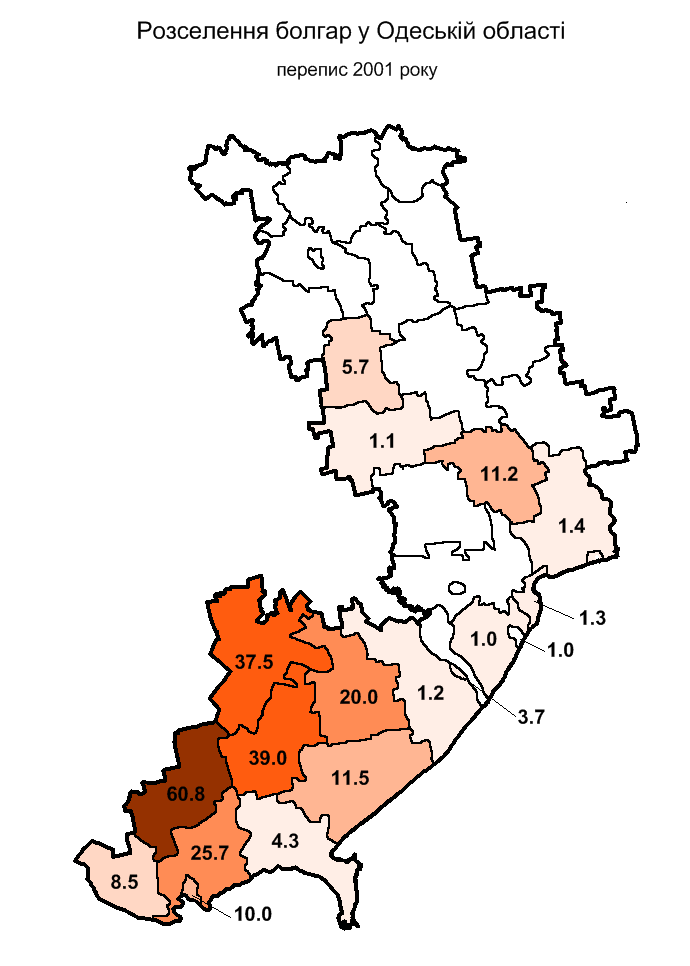
Percentage of Bulgarians in raions of Odesa Oblast (2001 census)

The Ukrainian oblasts with the highest number of Bulgarians are:

- Odesa Oblast: 150,700 (6.1%)
- Zaporizhzhia Oblast: 27,800 (1.4%)
- Mykolaiv Oblast: 5,600 (0.4%)
- Donetsk Oblast: 4,800 (0.1%)

== History ==
The modern population of Bulgarians settled in the region at the end of the 18th and beginning of the 19th century, at the time of feudal sedition in the Ottoman Empire and after the Russo-Turkish Wars. Particularly significant waves of emigration began after the Russo-Turkish Wars of 1806–1812 and 1828–1829. The settlers came primarily from what is now eastern Bulgaria, but many were also descendants of Bulgarians of the western part of the country that had moved east in and before the 18th century. Among the Bulgarians that emigrated were also a handful of Albanians who also had settled in eastern Bulgaria some time ago.

After arriving, the Bulgarians founded their own towns, such as Bolhrad (1819) and Comrat, and around 64 villages. In 1856, after the Treaty of Paris, the region of Bessarabia was divided with the southwestern parts, including Bolhrad, Izmail and Kiliia, incorporated into Moldova (since 1861 – Kingdom of Romania), and the northeastern ones, centered on Comrat, remaining in the Russian Empire. The first modern Bulgarian gymnasium (school) was founded in Bolhrad on 28 June 1858, which had a significant effect on the development of Bulgarian education and culture.

In 1861, 20,000 Bulgarians from the Romanian part of Bessarabia moved to Russia, where they were given land in Taurida Governorate to replace the Nogais who had left what was formerly territory of the Crimean Khanate. Those settlers founded another Bulgarian community—the Tauridan Bulgarians.

After the whole region was incorporated once again into the Russian Empire in 1878, the process of Russification grew stronger, as many Bulgarian intellectuals returned to the newly established Principality of Bulgaria to help set up the Bulgarian state. The Russian Empire deprived the Bulgarian minority of the rights earned during Romanian control.

The whole of Bessarabia was ceded to Romania in 1918 after the Russian Revolution and the collapse of the Russian Empire. In contrast with the previous period of Romanian control, most cultural and educational rights of the Bulgarian minority were taken away which led to cases of armed resistance such as the Tatarbunary Uprising of 1924.

The Molotov–Ribbentrop Pact of 1939 led to the June 1940 Soviet ultimatum, the invasion and annexation of Bessarabia by the Soviet Union. Although an officially accepted minority under Soviet rule, the local Bulgarians lost some features of their cultural identity.

A movement of national revival began in the 1980s, with the publication of Bulgarian newspapers, establishment of cultural and educational associations, and the introduction of Bulgarian into the local schools, accelerating after the dissolution of the Soviet Union and primarily offered as an elective, but later as a compulsory subject. The Association of Bulgarians in Ukraine was founded in 1993.

During the full-scale Russian invasion in Ukraine that began on February 24, 2022, a large part of the territories with a compact Bulgarian population were occupied by the Russian army, and in the occupied parts of the Zaporizhzhia Oblast, the occupation authorities forbade the study of the Bulgarian language and closed Bulgarian Sunday schools and centers, and their agricultural production has been forcibly bought at a pittance, and many of them are at risk of starvation.

== Notable Bulgarians from Ukraine ==
- Dimitar Agura, historian
- Grisha Filipov, former leading member of Bulgarian Communist Party, Prime Minister of Bulgaria
- Dimitar Grekov, politician and public figure, Prime Minister, Minister of Justice, Minister of Interior, president of the Sofia District Court, president of the Bulgarian Supreme Court, deputy in Constituent assembly,
- Aleksandar Malinov, politician and public figure, three times Prime Minister of Bulgaria
- Ruslan Maynov, bulgarian actor, singer and TV host
- Danail Nikolaev, a Bulgarian officer, Minister of War and General of the Infantry
- Ivan Plachkov, politician, two times Minister of Energy of Ukraine, former Chairman of the Management Board, General Director and chief engineer of Joint Stock Energy Supply Company "Kyivenergo".
- Aleksandar Teodorov-Balan, linguist, first rector of Sofia University
- Ivan Kolev, lieutenant general and officer in the Bulgarian Army
- Anton Kisse, ukrainian politician, currently and previously serving as People's Deputy of Ukraine, leader of Bulgarian minority, former member of Party of the Regions, and current president of the Association of Bulgarians in Ukraine, current member and co-chairman of politician's party Наш Край
- Yuri Stoyanov, Soviet theater and film actor
- Denys Stoyan, footballer
- Maksym Stoyan, footballer
- Eduard Stoyanov, footballer
- Vyacheslav Velyev, footballer
- Semen Radulov, wrestler
- Dmitrii Milev, writer

== See also ==
- Bulgaria–Ukraine relations
- Bessarabian Bulgarians
- Bulgarian diaspora
- Ethnic groups in Ukraine
- Ukrainians in Bulgaria
