= Bulgaria–Ukraine relations =

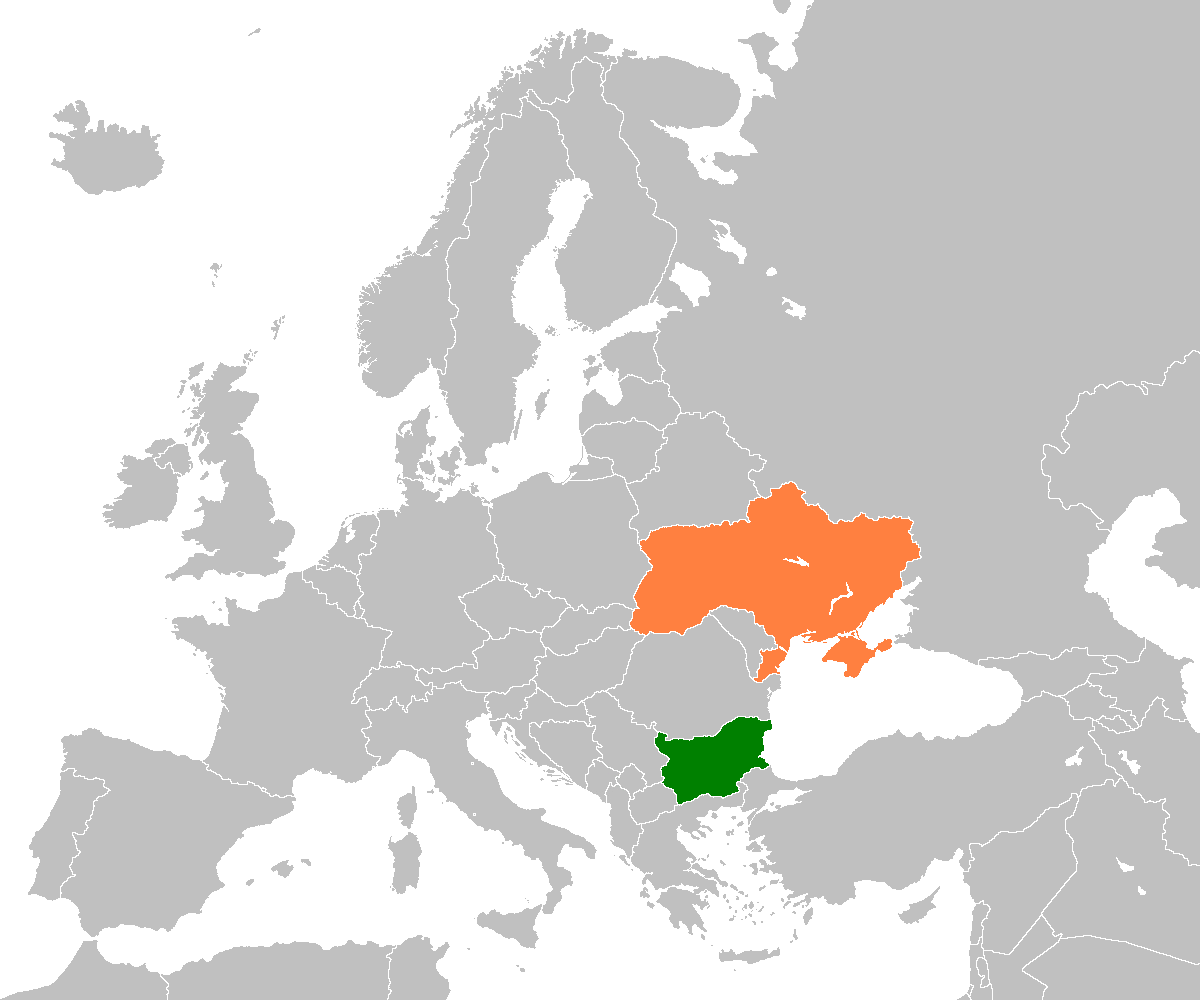

- Bulgaria: Ukraine

Bulgaria–Ukraine relations are foreign relations between the Republic of Bulgaria and Ukraine. Both countries established diplomatic relations in 1992. Bulgaria has an embassy in Kyiv and a Consulate-General in Odesa. Ukraine has an embassy in Sofia and a Consulate-General in Varna.

Bulgaria supports Ukraine's European Union and NATO membership. Bulgarians in Ukraine are a significant minority in the country, being the fifth largest minority and residing primarily in the southwestern regions.

== History ==
=== Early period ===
Relations between the people living in Bulgaria and Ukraine go back thousands of years, and parts of present-day Ukraine and Bulgaria were simultaneously controlled by multiple empires throughout history such as the Byzantine Empire and the Ottoman Empire. An important early result of the contact between the two regions was the adoption of the Cyrillic script, which was developed during the 9th century AD at the Preslav Literary School in the First Bulgarian Empire during the reign of Tsar Simeon I the Great. The script was brought to Kyivan Rus’ at the end of the first millennium, along with Christianity and the Old Bulgarian.

After the Middle Ages, both Bulgaria and the Ukrainian lands of the dissolved Kyivan Rus' would be incorporated in subsequent empires, with the former being taken over by the Ottoman Empire and the latter initially incorporated into the Polish-Lithuanian Commonwealth and, later, conquered by the Russian Empire. During this time, there were several military engagements between the empires which also saw direct collaboration and clashes between Bulgarian soldiers and Cossacks. In 1620, the Bulgarian city of Varna (then in the Ottoman Empire) was burned by invading Zaporizhian Cossacks as part of the Polish–Ottoman Wars. Later, after the Russian takeover of Ukraine, Bulgarians began to settle in the Russian Empire and some of them were assigned into military divisions by the Tsarist authorities, including the Bulgarian Hussar Division. However, due to understaffing and other problems, many of the Bulgarians deserted and instead joined the ranks of the Zaporizhian Sich, a proto-state in southern Ukraine which then began fielding its own Bulgarian cavalry division.

At the closing of the 18th century, larger scale settlement of Bulgarians in Russian-controlled Ukraine continued, and particularly significant waves of emigration began after the Russo-Turkish Wars of 1806–1812 and 1828–1829. After arriving, the Bulgarians founded their own towns, such as Bolhrad (1819) and Comrat, and around 64 villages. In 1856, after the Treaty of Paris, the region of Bessarabia (south-west to present-day Ukraine) was divided with the southwestern parts, including Bolhrad, Izmail and Kiliia, incorporated into Moldova (since 1861 – Kingdom of Romania), and the northeastern ones, centered on Comrat, remaining in the Russian Empire. A Bulgarian gymnasium (school) was founded in Bolhrad on 28 June 1858, which had a significant effect on the development of Bulgarian education and culture and was the first modern Bulgarian gymnasium. As the Ottoman Empire continued to weaken and gradually lose territory, Bulgarian expatriates in Ukraine and Romania agitated for independence and many Bulgarian intellectuals returned to the newly established Principality of Bulgaria to help set up the new state. Many people who would subsequently hold political office in Bulgaria received much of their education in Russian-controlled Ukraine: for example, Todor Burmov, the first Bulgarian Prime Minister was a graduate of the Kyiv Theological Academy.

=== 20th century ===
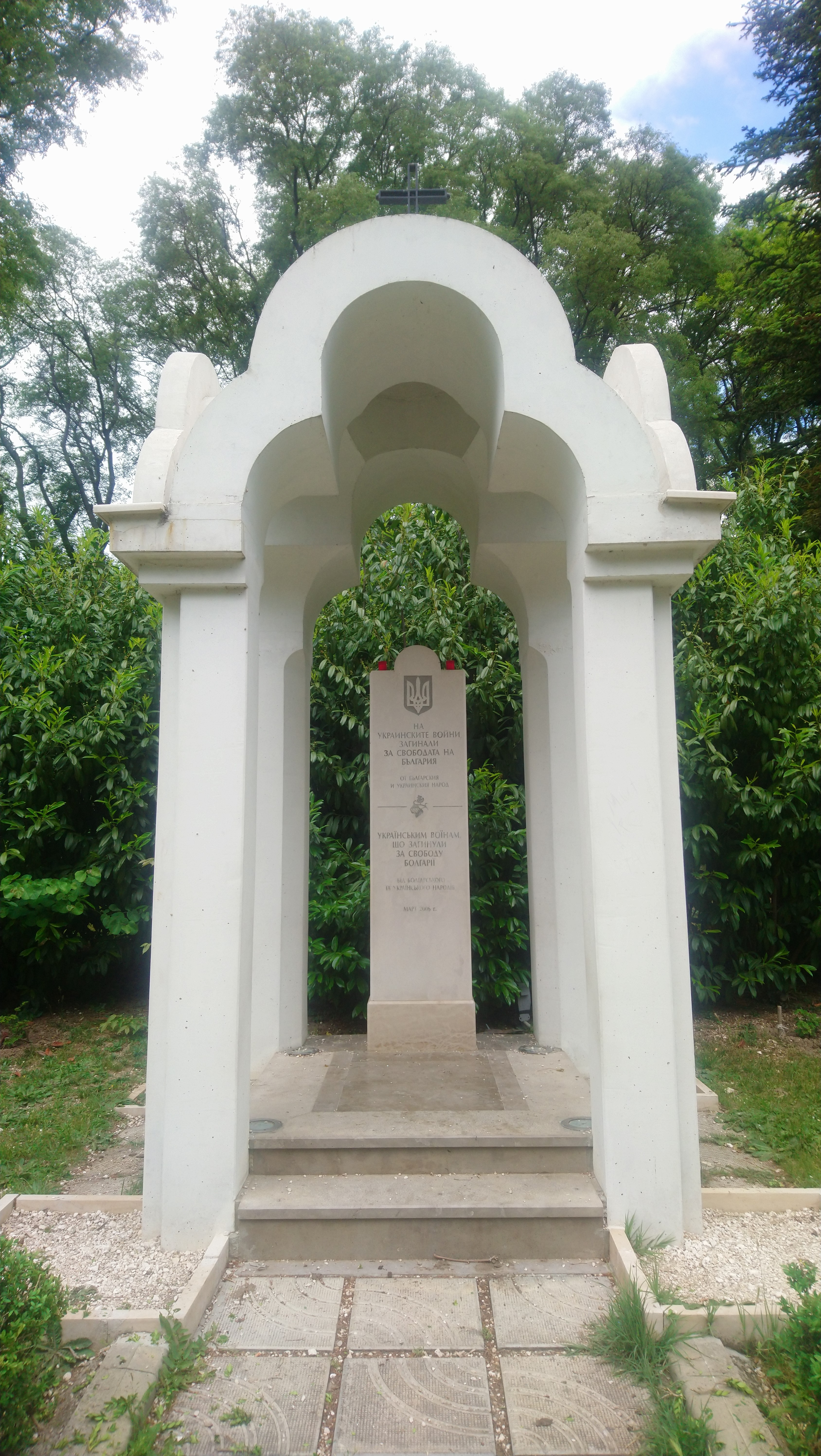
Monument to the Ukrainian soldiers who died for the freedom of Bulgaria (2006), Sea Garden in Varna, Bulgaria

Modern relations between Bulgaria and Ukraine as independent nations began only in the final stages of World War I, when the Kingdom of Bulgaria established official diplomatic relations with the newly independent Ukrainian People's Republic, following the Treaty of Brest-Litovsk on 9 February 1918. That same year, there was an exchange of embassies between the two countries. This mutual recognition did not, however, last long, as by this point Bulgaria was still involved in the war with the German Empire, whose preoccupations with Ukraine took precedence and led to the failure of developing robust trade relations.

On 24 September 1918, following the Bulgarian collapse at the Vardar offensive, Bulgaria signed the armistice of Salonica, ending its participation in World War I. After the defeat, the country fell under the French zone of occupation, and the French authorities refused to recognize the Ukrainian embassy in Bulgaria as an official diplomatic representation. The Bulgarian government, in turn, actually ceased to recognize this diplomatic representation, and by 1920 the embassy no longer operated. The Ukrainian People's Republic was at the time in the middle of a war with the Soviet Union and other groups, and the Soviets had overrun much of the country by 1920, which led to a subsequent invasion of Poland by the Soviets. After the Soviets were stopped at Warsaw, a new peace treaty was signed, the Peace of Riga, which led to the consolidation of the Ukrainian Soviet Socialist Republic as part of the Soviet Union, with parts of Western Ukraine going instead to Poland. Bulgaria refused to open official diplomatic channels with the Soviet Union until the 1930s, and thus Bulgarian and Ukrainian contacts ceased.

During World War II, Bulgaria was a member of the Axis powers, but unlike most of Nazi Germany's allies, it did not take part in the Axis invasion of the Soviet Union, which initially overran the entirety of the Ukrainian SSR. The only contact between the Bulgarian and Soviet forces at first consisted only in skirmishes over the Black Sea as the Soviets harassed Bulgarian shipping convoys. By 1944, however, the Axis had suffered major setbacks and following the defection of Romania, Soviet forces arrived at the Bulgarian border and began occupying the country. In the following years, and during the entirety of the Cold War, Bulgaria and Ukraine were thus both part of the Eastern Bloc, the former as a Soviet satellite state and the latter as a constituent republic of the Soviet Union.

=== Present day ===
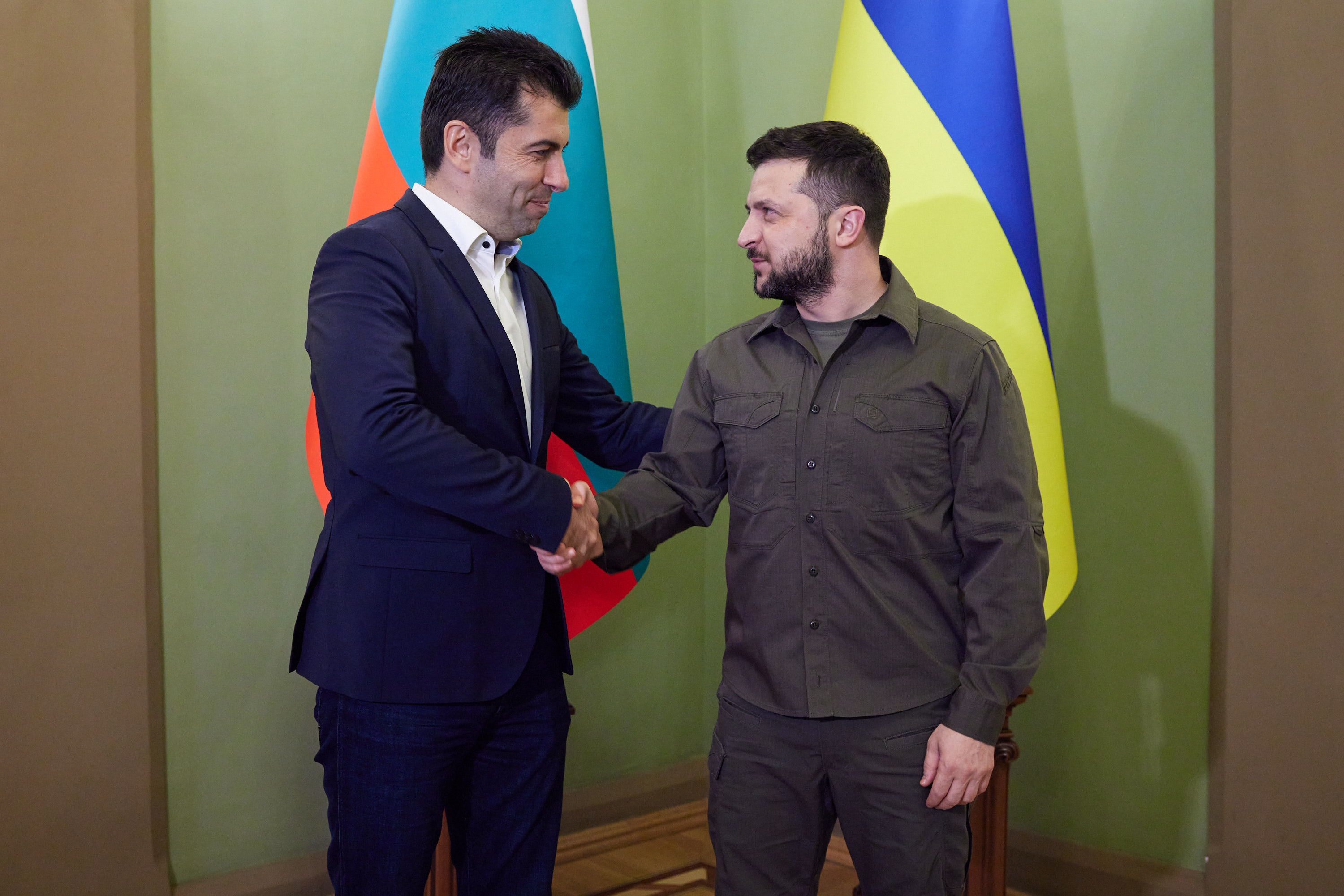
Meeting of Bulgarian Prime Minister Kiril Petkov with Ukrainian President Volodymyr Zelenskyy on 28 April 2022, in Kyiv

The fall of Communism in eastern Europe beginning in 1989 would usher in a new era for Bulgarian-Ukrainian relations. In November 1989 the Communist regime in Bulgaria was overthrown, and two years later, following the Belovezha Accords, the Soviet Union was dissolved and Ukraine became once again an independent country in December 1991. Bulgaria was one of the first countries to recognize Ukraine's independence on 5 December 1991, and established diplomatic relations with it on 13 December of the same year. Bilateral relations between Bulgaria and Ukraine are built on the basis of the Treaty on Friendly Relations and Cooperation (signed on 5 October 1992, in force since 2 March 1994) and the Declaration on the further development and deepening of cooperation between the Republic of Bulgaria and Ukraine, signed by the presidents of Bulgaria and Ukraine in 1998.

The post-communist period saw Bulgaria and Ukraine engaged in numerous international organizations. The deepening of Ukrainian-Bulgarian ties was facilitated by the official visits of the Chairman of the People's Assembly of the Republic of Bulgaria to Ukraine (June 2003) and the Chairman of the Verkhovna Rada of Ukraine to Bulgaria (January 2004), the Prime Minister of Bulgaria Simeon Sakskoburggotski (May 2004) and Deputy Prime Minister, Minister of Foreign Affairs of Bulgaria Ivailo Kalfin (29–30 November 2005). Kyiv congratulated Sofia on its official accession to NATO in 2004 and the signing of the Agreement on Bulgaria's Accession to the EU in 2005. Bulgaria, in turn, proved its readiness to contribute to the European and Euro-Atlantic integration of Ukraine.

Bulgaria supported the Ukrainian position following the 2014 annexation of Crimea by the Russian Federation and the subsequent War in Donbass, with Bulgarian President Rumen Radev calling the annexation a violation of international law. Bulgaria became a strong supporter of Ukraine after the country was invaded by Russia in 2022. The country accepted up to 500,000 Ukrainian refugees fleeing the war. Bulgarian Prime Minister Kiril Petkov visited Kyiv in April 2022 as a show of support to the country. Bulgaria became a critical supplier of diesel, weapons and ammunition to Ukraine in the early stages of the war, and Bulgaria took a leading role in the imposition of sanctions against Russia on the initiative of Prime Minister Petkov and Finance Minister Assen Vassilev during a meeting with other EU delegates. Bulgarian weapons factories have also been repairing damaged Ukrainian tanks.

In June 2026, Bulgaria’s Defence Minister Dimitar Stoyanov said the country would no longer provide weapons to Ukraine, stating that further deliveries were not planned and calling for negotiations between Russia and Ukraine to end the war. He described the conflict as a war of attrition in which additional weapons would only result in further loss of life. Stoyanov also noted that Ukraine had not submitted any new requests for arms since 8 May 2026 and that Bulgaria’s available stockpiles had fallen below minimum levels, meaning no further supplies would be provided.

== Economic ties ==
Bulgarian exports to Ukraine vary in the range of 250–350 million euros per year. The principal Bulgarian exports to Ukraine are fertilizers, pharmaceuticals, machinery and electrical products. In terms of Ukrainian exports, they hover around 500–600 million euros per year. Ukrainian exports to Bulgaria are concentrated in concentrated in semi-finished products of iron or non-alloy steels, sunflower and ammonia.

== Resident diplomatic missions ==
- Bulgaria has an embassy in Kyiv and consulate-general in Odesa.
- Ukraine has an embassy in Sofia.
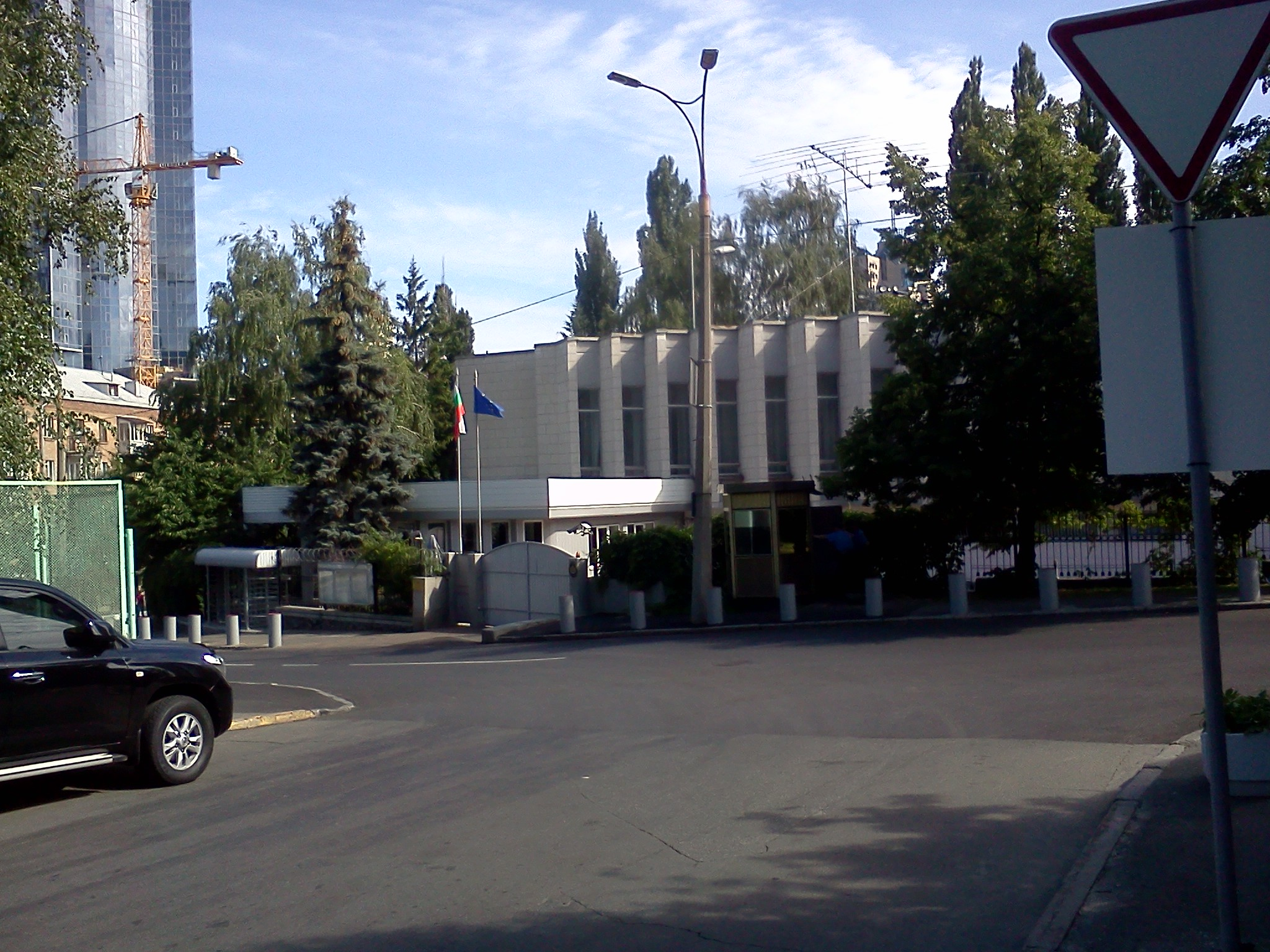
Embassy of Bulgaria in Kyiv

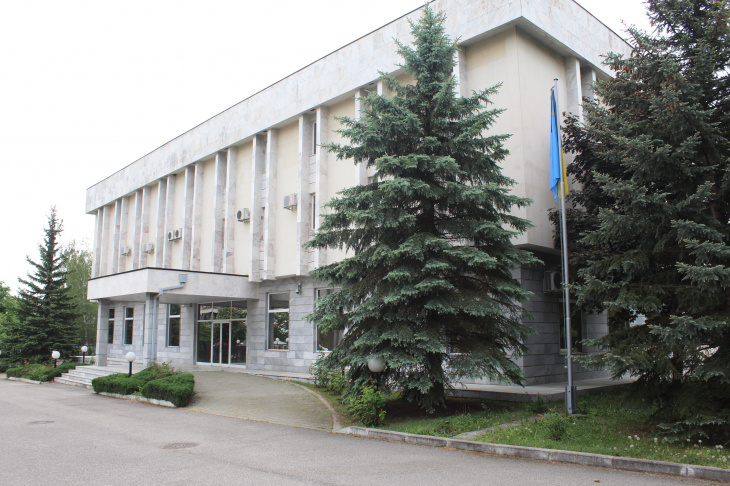
Embassy of Ukraine in Sofia

== See also ==
- Foreign relations of Bulgaria
- Foreign relations of Ukraine
- Ukraine–EU relations
  - Accession of Ukraine to the EU
- Ukraine–NATO relations
- Bulgarians in Ukraine
- Ukrainians in Bulgaria
