= Anastasiya Kisse =

Bulgarian-Ukrainian rhythmic gymnast (born 1995)

Anastasiya Antonovna Kisse
- Born: 27 July 1995 (age 31) Odesa, Ukraine
- Height: 170 cm (5 ft 7 in)

Gymnastics career
- Discipline: Rhythmic gymnastics
- Country represented: Bulgaria
- Club: Levski
- Retired: 2014

Anastasiya Kisse (Bulgarian: Анастасия Антоновна Кисе; Ukrainian: Анастасія Антонівна Кіссе; born 27 July 1995) is a Bulgarian and Ukrainian individual rhythmic gymnast. She represented her nation at international competitions. She competed at world championships, including at the 2011 World Rhythmic Gymnastics Championships.

She holds both Bulgarian and Ukrainian citizenships.

== Early life ==
Anastasiya was born on July 27, 1995, in Odesa, Ukraine, to the Ukrainian politician of Bulgarian origin Anton Kisse and his wife Galina Kisse.

== Education ==
Kisse has lived and studied in Ukraine, Russia, Bulgaria, Azerbaijan and The United Kingdom. She has graduated secondary school in London, England, after living there for three years. She has studied law in Bulgaria for onr year and currently studies Finance in UNWE in Sofia, Bulgaria. She also has a bachelor's and master's degree from the K. D. Ushynsky South Ukrainian National Pedagogical University in Odesa.

She speaks several languages, including English, Bulgarian, Ukrainian and Russian.

== Career ==
Kisse starts training at the age of 3 in Ukraine. Later she moves and continues training in Bulgaria. She has also lived and trained in Azerbaijan and with the national team of Russia in Novogorsk in Moscow. She was a member of the Junior Olympic team of rhythmic gymstastics of Bulgaria. Kisse has taken part and won medals in the Junior Olympic Games and many more.

However, Kisse was forced to retire from sports after her last trauma in the back, which doesn't allow her to continue training. She puts an end to her career in 2014.

She is currently working in the Russian embassy in Sofia, as well as a coach to an Estonian gymnast.

== Personal life ==
Anastasiya's father is the current president of the Association of Bulgarians of Ukraine and the deputy of the Verkhovna Rada of Ukraine Anton Kisse. Anastasiya has two older brothers, Gennadiy and Maksim. Gennadiy has graduated Law in the Taras Shevchenko National University of Kyiv and currently works as an assistant to the Prosecutor General of Ukraine, while Maksim has graduated the Odesa National Economics University in Ukraine. Anastasiya holds both Ukrainian and Bulgarian citizenship.

Anastasiya is close friends with the Russian 2016 Olympic All-around silver medalist Yana Kudryavtseva and the 2016 Olympic All-around Champion and gold medalist Margarita Mamun.
