= Ivan Shishmanov =

Bulgarian writer, politician and psychologist (1862–1928)

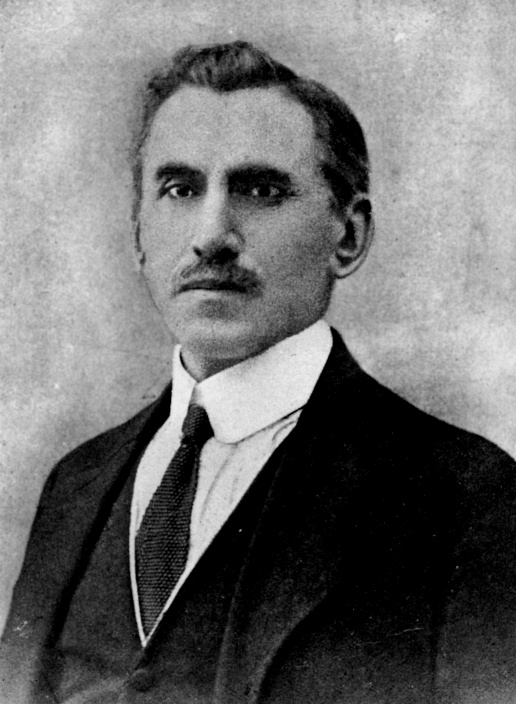
- Born: July 4, 1862; Svishtov, Ottoman Empire (now Svishtov, Veliko Tarnovo Province, Bulgary)
- Died: June 22, 1928 (aged 65); Oslo, Norway
- Occupations: writer, ethnographer, politician, diplomat

Ivan Shishmanov (Bulgarian: Иван Димитров Шишманов; July 4, 1862 – June 22, 1928) was a Bulgarian writer, ethnographer, politician and diplomat. He served as Ambassador of Bulgaria to the Ukrainian State and the Ukrainian People's Republic.

== Biography ==
Ivan Shishmanov was born on June 22, 1862, in Svishtov in the Shishmanovs family. He studied at the Pedagogical School in Vienna from 1876 to 1882. He then studied philosophy and literature at Jena in 1884 and spent two years at Geneva. In 1888, he finished his Ph.D. studies in Leipzig under the direction of Professor Wilhelm Wundt.

On December 28, 1888, he married Lidia Shishmanova, the daughter of Mykhailo Drahomanov. In 1889, their son Dimitr was born, he would become a literary critic and playwright. In 1888 Shishmanov was one of the founders of the High School of Sofia. In 1894 he became Professor of General Literary and Cultural History, and comparative literary history. He was also the founder and editor of Folklore and Ethnography Collection (СбНУНК) from 1889 to 1902 and the Bulgarian Observer magazine from 1893 to 1900. Shishmanov was a member of the Bulgarian Academy of Sciences.

He was also one of the founders of the State Drawing School, which later became the National Academy of Art (1896).

Shishmanov was a member of the People's Liberal Party, and in 1903 he became Minister of Public Education, but in early 1907 he left office because of disagreement with the government's actions during the University crisis. As a minister of education, he opened the school for the blind in 1906.

Shishmanov acted as a plenipotentiary representative of Bulgaria in the Ukrainian People's Republic during the reign of Pavlo Skoropadsky in 1918–1919. King Ferdinand I sent him to Kyiv. He founded and served as the first president of the Bulgarian Department of the Pan-European Union. He donated a portion of his library to the Vardar Macedonia Student Association. Shishmanov was a member of the Macedonian Scientific Institute

He died in Oslo on June 23, 1928, at the age of 65.

His son, Dimitr Shishmanov, writer and politician, was executed by the People's Court due to his work as the Secretary of the Ministry of Foreign Affairs, and then the Minister of Foreign Affairs.

== Creative heritage ==
In his research, he used a positivist methodology. He wrote works in the field of folk art and literature of national revival, as well as comparative works on European literature of the XVIII century and journalistic articles.

He wrote works on ethnography and literary science. An expert on Ukrainian literature, in particular the works of Taras Shevchenko, he investigated the influence of Shevchenko's poetry on Bulgarian revival, having written the work "The role of Ukraine in the Bulgarian revival. The Influence of Shevchenko on Bulgarian Poets before the Liberation Age" (1916).

The initiator and founder of the Bulgarian-Ukrainian Society (1920). Shevchenko Scientific Society member.

== Bibliography ==
- Славянски селища в Крит и на другите гръцки острови. — Български преглед, 1897, кн. 3.
- Наченки на руското влияние в българската книжнина. С., 1899.
- Критичен преглед на въпроса за произхода на прабългарите от езиково гледище и етимологиите на името «българин». — СбНУНК, XVI—XVII, 1900.
- Тарас Шевченко — неговото творчество и неговото влияние върху българските писатели преди Освобождението. С., 1914.
- Избрани съчинения в три тома. С., 1965–1971
- Дневник 1879—1927 г. С., 2003.

== Literature ==
- Головченко В. І. Шишманов Іван Димитров // Українська дипломатична енциклопедія : у 2 т. / Л. В. Губерський (голова). — К. : Знання України, 2004. — Т. 2 : М — Я. — 812 с. — ISBN 966-316-045-4. (in Ukrainian)
- Енциклопедія українознавства : Словникова частина : [в 11 т.] / Наукове товариство імені Шевченка ; гол. ред. проф., д-р Володимир Кубійович. — Париж ; Нью-Йорк : Молоде життя ; Львів ; Київ : Глобус, 1955–2003. Словникова частина. — Т. 10. (in Ukrainian)
- Матяш І. Роль дипломатичних установ у започаткуванні українсько-болгарських міждержавних відносин (1918—1921 рр.) // Український історичний журнал. — 2018. — No. 2 (539) (березень—квітень). — С. 53–73. (in Ukrainian)
- Павленко В. Іван Шишманов — повноважний посол Болгарії в Україні // Міжнародні зв'язки України: наукові пошуки і знахідки. — К., 2010. — Т. 19. — С. 59–70. (in Ukrainian)
- Шевченківський словник — С. 389. (in Ukrainian)
- Гечева Кр. Иван Д. Шишманов. Биобиблиография. — С., 2003. (in Bulgarian)
- Иван Д. Шишманов — ученият и гражданинът. Шишманови четения. Кн. 2. С., 2007. (in Bulgarian)
- Иван Д. Шишманов — наука и политика. Шишманови четения. Кн. 3. С., 2008. (in Bulgarian)
- Стойчева, Т. Филологът в помощ на министъра: програма на Иван Шишманов за българската култура. — В: Езици и култури в диалог: Традиции, приемственост, новаторство. Конференция, посветена на 120-годишната история на преподаването на класически и нови филологии в Софийския университет «Св. Климент Охридски». С., УИ, 2010, (in Bulgarian)
- Конева, Р. Европейският и паневропейският културен оптимизъм на Иван Шишманов.- Балканистичен форум, кн./1-2-3, 2009, 288–307, (in Bulgarian)
- Конева, Р. Иван Шишманов и Обединена Европа. С., 2011, ИК Гутенберг, 236 с (in Bulgarian)
