= Anton Kisse =

Ukrainian politician and Bulgarian community leader

- Антон Кисе
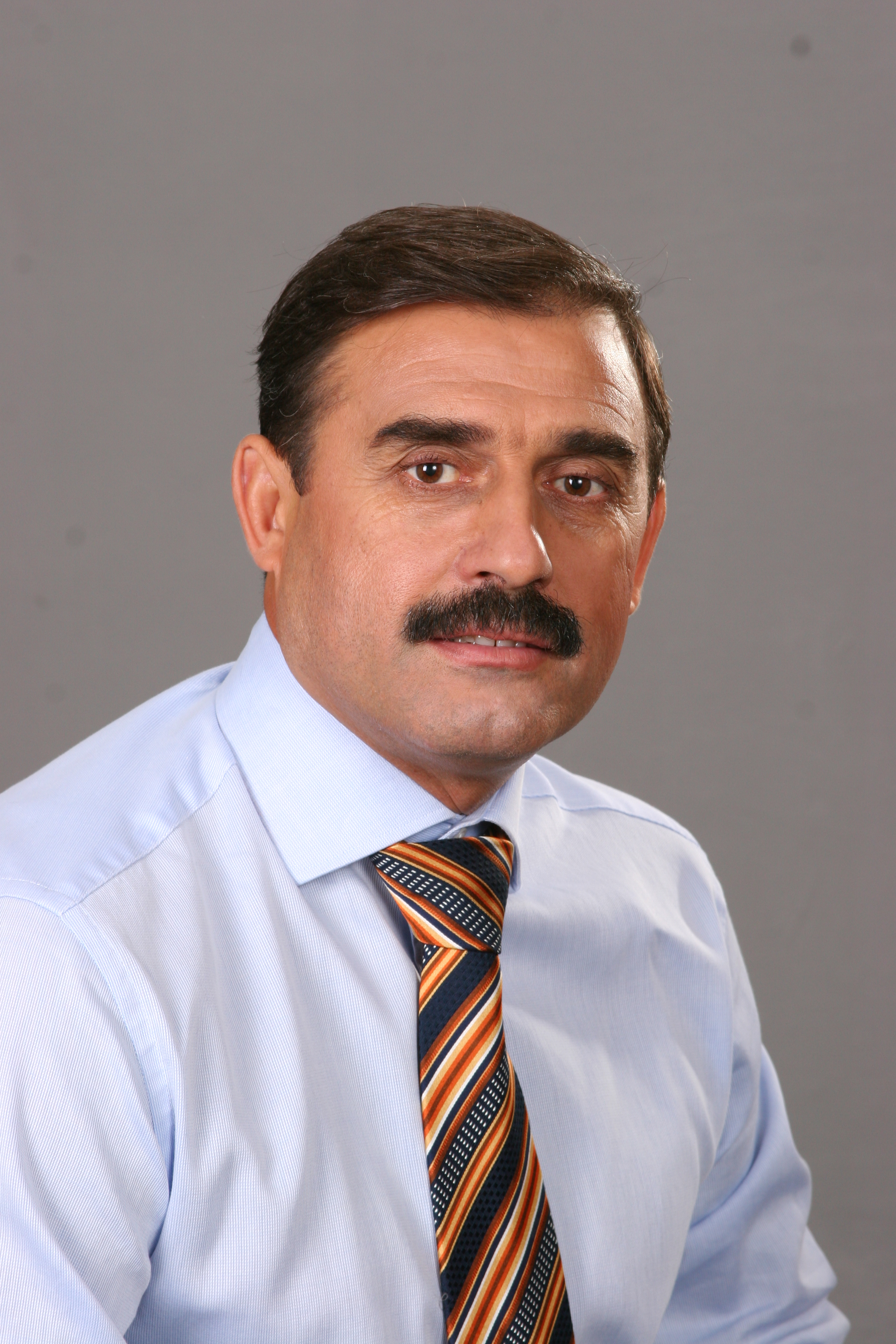
- Kisse in 2013

People's Deputy of Ukraine
- Incumbent
- Assumed office 12 December 2012
- Preceded by: Constituency established
- Constituency: Odesa Oblast, No. 142
- In office 22 June 2004 – 25 May 2006
- Preceded by: Serhii Kivalov
- Succeeded by: Constituency abolished
- Constituency: Odesa Oblast, No. 135

Personal details
- Born: 10 October 1958 (age 67) Yevhenivka, Tarutyne Raion, Odesa Oblast, Ukrainian SSR, Soviet Union
- Party: Independent
- Other political affiliations: Party of Regions

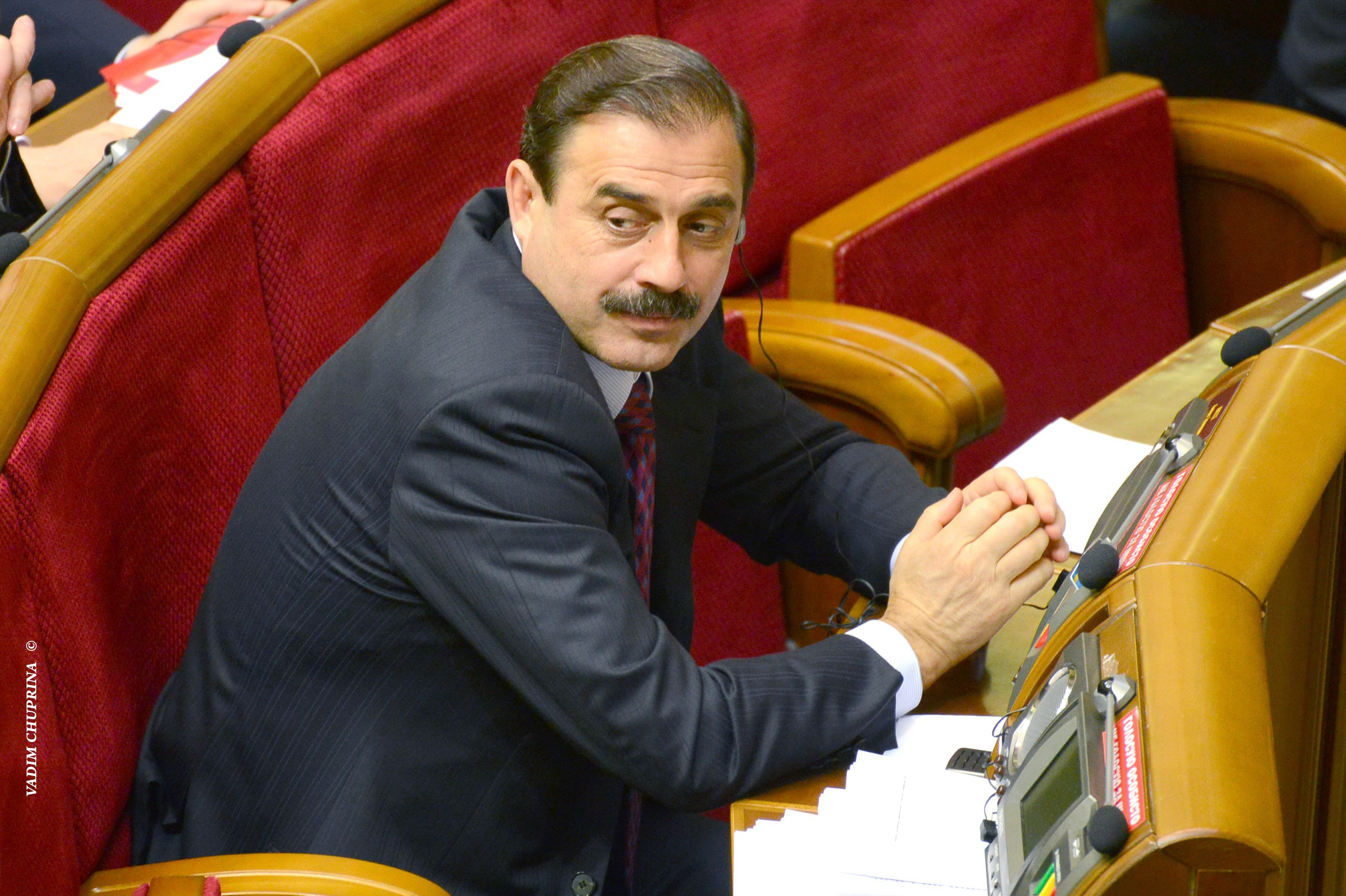
In Verkhovna Rada, 2013

Anton Ivanovych Kisse (Bulgarian: Антон Иванович Кисе, romanized: Anton Ivanovich Kise, Ukrainian: Анто́н Іва́нович Кіссе́; born 10 October 1958) is a Ukrainian politician and Bulgarian community leader currently serving as a People's Deputy of Ukraine since 12 December 2012, previously serving in the role from 22 June 2004 to 25 May 2006. A former member of Party of Regions and current president of the Association of Bulgarians in Ukraine, Kisse is a native of Budjak region in Odesa Oblast, Ukraine.

== Political career ==
He was one of the 148 deputies of the Verkhovna Rada (parliament of Ukraine), who signed an appeal to the Polish Sejm to hold Volyn tragedy of genocide against the Poles. This statement was the first President of Ukraine Leonid Kravchuk called one that can be equated to a national treason.

From 1990 to 1998, Anton Kisse was a deputy of the Odesa Oblast Council. From 1998 to 2004, he served as a deputy of the Odesa City Council.

Kisse unsuccessfully contested the 2002 Ukrainian parliamentary election for electoral district 141, losing to Ihor Plokhoi. However, in he won the 2004 by-election in electoral district 135, becoming a People's Deputy of Ukraine.

From October 2007 to November 2012, he was again a deputy of the Odesa Oblast Council. He worked in the Commission for Culture, tourism, spirituality and international relations, joined the faction of deputies from the Party of Regions. In 2012 he opened the monument of Russian general and governor of Bessarabia, Ivan Inzov, in one of villages in Artsyz Raion.

Kisse was an independent candidate in election district 142 (located in Odesa Oblast) during the 2012 Ukrainian parliamentary election, he finished first place with 39.06% of the votes (and thus returned to the national parliament); Ihor Plokhoi of Party of Regions placed second with 26.36% of the votes.

During the 2014 pro-Russian unrest in Ukraine and the 2014 Odesa clashes, Kisse was briefly associated with separatist groups in Odesa Oblast. However, he has since denied any connection to the separatist movements in Odesa Oblast, and rejected the movement.

Kisse was an independent candidate in electoral district 142 during the 2014 Ukrainian parliamentary election, he finished first place with 52.96% of the votes (and thus regained his parliamentary seat); Serhii Parashchenko of Petro Poroshenko Bloc placed second with 35.85% of the votes.

Kisse was again an independent candidate in election district 142 during the 2019 Ukrainian parliamentary election, he finished first place with 28.58% of the votes (and thus regained his parliamentary seat); Ruslan Plokhoi of Servant of the People placed second with 23.37% of the votes. In parliament he joined the For the Future faction.

== Personal life ==
Kisse's daughter Anastasia is a member of the Bulgarian Olympic team in gymnastics.
