= Mykhailo Drahomanov =

Ukrainian intellectual (1841–1895)

Mykhailo Drahomanov Михайло Драгоманов
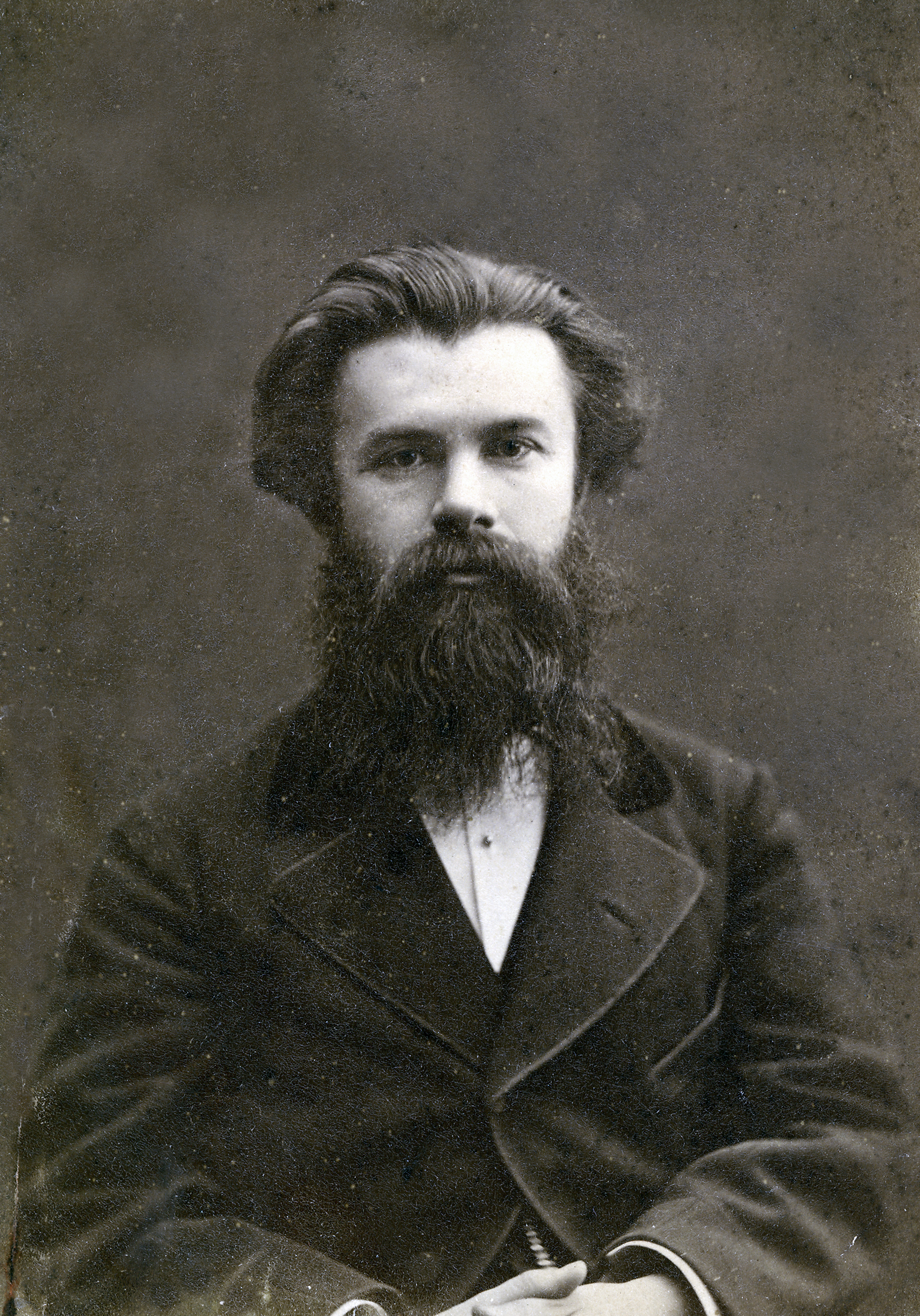
- Born: 18 September 1841; Hadiach, Poltava Governorate, Russian Empire (present-day Poltava Oblast, Ukraine)
- Died: 2 July 1895 (aged 53); Sofia, Bulgaria
- Resting place: Central Sofia Cemetery
- Education: University of Kyiv
- Occupations: Historian, publicist
- Spouse: Lyudmyla Drahomanova
- Children: Lidia Shishmanova
- Relatives: Lesya Ukrainka (niece); Olena Pchilka (sister)
- Writing career
- Language: Ukrainian, Russian
- Period: Ukrainian national revival
- Genres: Academic writing, political journalism
- Subjects: Ukrainian history, culture and politics
- Movement: Radicalism

Mykhailo Petrovych Drahomanov (Ukrainian: Михайло Петрович Драгоманов; 18 September 1841 – 2 July 1895) was a Ukrainian intellectual and public figure. As an academic, Drahomanov was an economist, historian, philosopher, and ethnographer, while as a public intellectual he was a political theorist with socialist leanings, perhaps best known as one of the first proponents of Ukrainian nationalism. For Drahomanov, ethnographic studies had a deep influence on his political ideas, and his politics in turn motivated study of particular areas of Ukrainian folk literature.

== Biography ==
=== Early life in Poltava (1841-1859) ===
Mykhailo Drahomanov was born on 18 September [O.S. 6 September] 1841, into a Zaporozhian Cossack minor noble family of Greek ancestry in Hadiach, a town in the Poltava Governorate of the Russian Empire. The family descended from a Greek dragoman who served in the chancellery of Hetman Bohdan Khmelnytsky.

His family's status meant Drahomanov was closely acquainted with the ideas of progressivism from an early age. His father, Petro Drahomanov, was influenced by the liberal ideas of the Enlightenment and provided legal aid to serfs and military conscripts. His uncle, Yakiv Drahomanov, was a member of the Society of United Slavs and a sympathiser of the Decembrists.

Mykhailo Drahomanov became an avid learner, enrolling at the Poltava Classical Gymnasium in 1853, where he was exposed to the works of the socialist Alexander Herzen and the historian Friedrich Schlosser. At the Gymnasium, he also began his career in journalism, editing his secret club's handwritten journal. When he took the side of a fellow student against mistreatment by a school inspector, he was expelled from the Gymnasium before he could graduate, only managing to finish his secondary education following the intervention of the liberal pedagogue Nikolay Pirogov.

=== Scholarship and activism in Kyiv (1859-1876) ===
In 1859, Drahomanov enrolled in the University of Kyiv, where he studied history. He quickly joined a radical student circle that participated in the early stages of the "Going to the People" campaign, establishing some of the first folk high school in Ukraine, before their suppression by the Russian government in 1862.

He was present during the transfer of Taras Shevchenko's remains from Saint Petersburg to Kaniv in 1861, giving a speech over his coffin when the funeral train stopped in Kyiv. He also spoke in defense of his mentor Pirogov, who had been dismissed from his post for his liberalism, praising him for his educational reforms, particularly his abolition of corporal punishment. As a result, Drahomanov was censored by the university administration, but also brought him closer to his liberal professors, with one recommending him to the university's governing council. But Drahomanov's ascent was blocked by the conservative administration, as part of a generalised reaction to the January Uprising in Poland.

Following the death of his father, Drahomanov took a job as a geography teacher at a Kyiv high school, in order to financially support his family. His financial situation worsened following his marriage and the subsequent death of his mother-in-law, forcing him to take a second job as a journalist for the Petersburg News, for which he wrote about the situation of life in Ukraine. On 25 May 1864, after defending his thesis about Tiberius, he was admitted as a lecturer at Kyiv University. From his studies of ancient history, Drahomanov's interests shifted towards Slavic history, particularly concentrating on folklore. In 1867, he published a collection of Ukrainian folklore, which was the only type of Ukrainian-language publication that wasn't forbidden by the authorities. In 1869, he collaborated with Volodymyr Antonovych on the publication of a collection of Ukrainian folk music.

It was at this time that he became involved with the Hromada, a secret society that advocated for education in the Ukrainian language. This drew the attention of the Russian authorities, which suspected the society had links with the Polish insurrection and began to repress the nascent movement for Ukrainian nationalism, with Pyotr Valuyev prohibiting the printing of works in Ukrainian. When Drahomanov published a review of a book by Alexander Shirinsky-Shikhmatov, criticising it for Great Russian chauvinism, Drahomanov was publicly accused by the Russian press of advocating separatism and subsequently fell under surveillance by the secret police. Nevertheless, he remained active in radical politics, even criticising revolutionary students from Saint Petersburg that advocated for centralized government in Russia.

The Kingdom of Galicia (red) within Austria-Hungary (dark-grey), a region which Drahomanov described as his "second homeland".

In 1870, when Drahomanov defended his master's thesis about Tacitus and was nominated by the university council to become an assistant professor, his appointment was initially blocked by Shirinsky-Shikhmatov, which prevented him from receiving funds during his scholarly trip abroad. His travels took him first to Germany, where he witnessed the Franco-Prussian War, attended lectures by Theodor Mommsen and studied the Slavic cultural movement in Lusatia. He then went on to Switzerland, where he met a number of Russian emigres and debated with them the establishment of socialism, himself declaring that political freedom was a necessary prerequisite, while others considered Russian peasants to already be ready for a socialist society. He finally went to Austria-Hungary, where he met Ukrainians from Galicia, then a possession of the Habsburg monarchy. When he visited Galicia himself, he discovered that society there was largely stagnant, with inertia even affecting the radicals and populists. In an attempt to combat this, he took to writing a number of progressive articles, in which he criticised the Galician political leadership, and established the Shevchenko Scientific Society, which became a center for Ukrainian scholarship in Lviv. During his trip, he also continued his studies of ancient history, collected folklore studies for comparison and began to write his first political works. In 1872, he published an article in Vestnik Evropy, in which he argued that policies of Russification targeting ethnic minorities aided the eastern expansion of the German Empire.

In September 1873, Drahomanov arrived back in Kyiv, where he was finally appointed as an assistant professor for the university and joined the Ukrainian section of the Russian Geographical Society, with which he published his collections of Ukrainian folklore and folk music. The Society and Drahomanov himself quickly came under attack by the city's reactionaries around the newspaper Kievlyanin, which accused the Society of separatism and Drahomanov of being a Polish agent. After Drahomanov began working at the Kievsky Telegraph, he fell under even greater censorship by the Russian authorities, which removed his articles about Ukraine from Russian newspapers. In May 1875, the local curator requested Drahomanov resign from the university, due to the allegations of separatism. But instead of resigning, he returned to Galicia, where he continued his work of Europeanisation and worked as a liaison between Ukrainians in the empires of Austria and Russia, even advocating for the liberation of Carpathian Ruthenia from Hungarian rule. Drahomanov's influence helped to stimulate political life in Galicia, especially through his articles in the student newspaper Druh, which formed the nucleus of what would become the Ukrainian Radical Party.

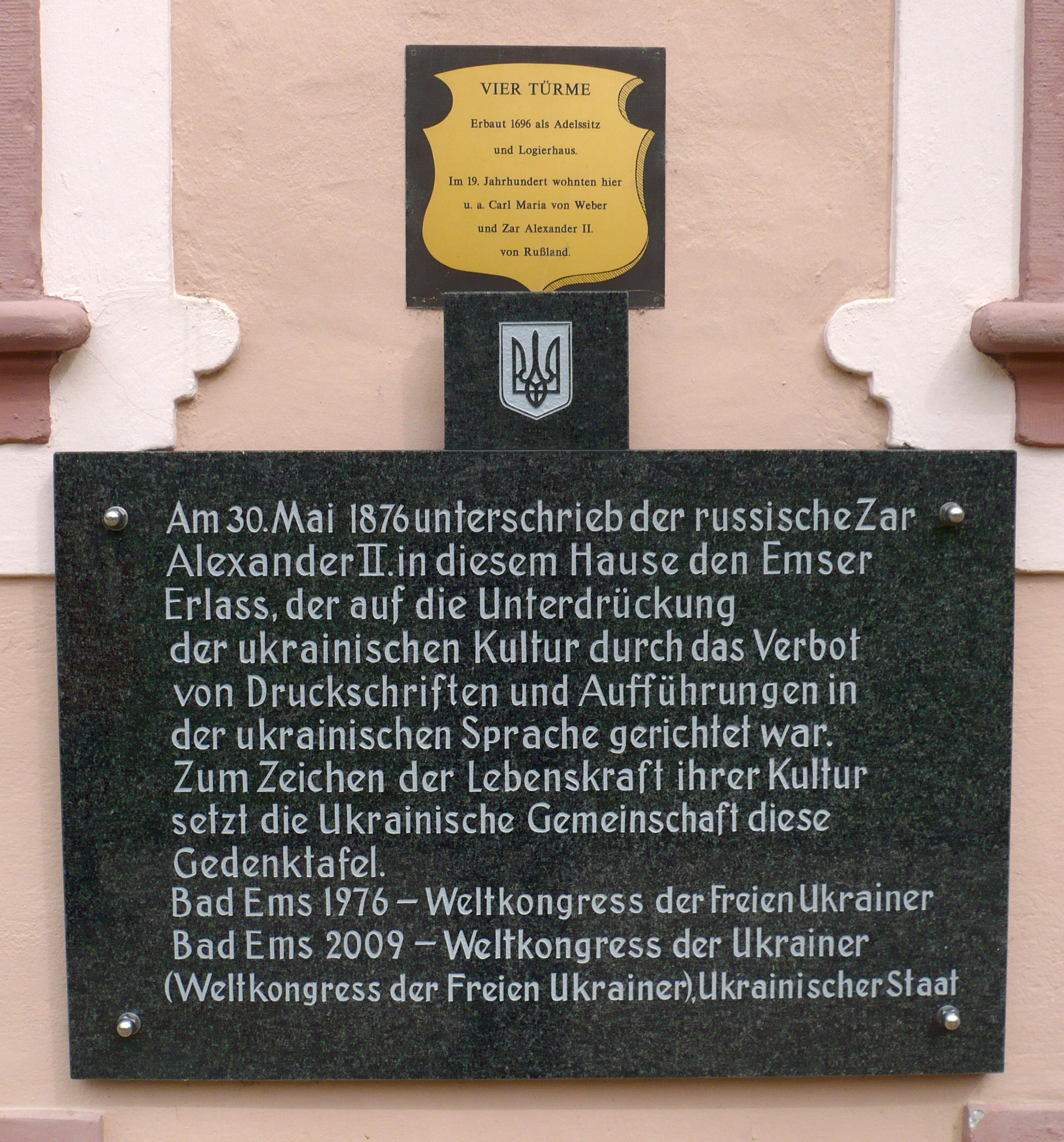
A monument to the Ems Ukaz, a decree by Alexander II that prohibited the use of the Ukrainian language.

But Drahomanov's presence in Galicia brought greater scrutiny by the Russian authorities, with Alexander II himself ordering Drahomanov's dismissal from Kyiv University and appointing a commission suppress Ukrainian separatism. In May 1876, Alexander II issued the Ems Ukaz, which prohibited all Ukrainian language publications and public performances, shut down the Ukrainian Geographical Society and formally banished Ukrainian nationalists, including Drahomanov himself. The Hromada responded by appointing Drahomanov to represent the Ukrainian national movement abroad and pledged to financially support him in exile. In May 1876, Drahomanov left Ukraine for Vienna. But before he could get settled, the Austrian imperial government initiated against the Galician socialist movement and accused Drahomanov himself of being its leader, forcing him to flee to Switzerland.

=== Exile in Switzerland (1876-1889) ===
In Geneva, Drahomanov began working on a socialist political program for the Hromada, as well as several other literary works: penning a collection of Ukrainian socialist music; writing about living and working conditions in Ukraine; and editing a novel by Panas Myrny and Ivan Bilyk.

He again engaged in a debate with Russian revolutionaries, such as those of Narodnaya Volya, as he considered the establishment of socialism to require a gradual evolutionary process, rather than a swift revolutionary one. He also criticised their tendencies towards authoritarianism, Great Russian chauvinism and Machiavellianism, particularly disapproving of their terrorist tactics, which culminated with the assassination of Alexander II.

In August 1881, Drahomanov became editor-in-chief for the journal Volnoye Slovo, which attracted readers and correspondents from opponents of the Tsarist autocracy, due to its advocacy of the Zemstvo system of self-governance and its opposition to revolutionary terror. Following the 1917 Revolution, the journal was discovered to have been financially supported by the Okhrana, due specifically to Drahomanov's opposition to Narodnaya Volya's terrorism, which Pavel Shuvalov hoped would split the revolutionary socialist movement. By May 1883, the journal had shuttered, after Alexander III committed to reactionary politics and dissolved Shuvalov's project. The following month, Drahomanov was joined in Geneva by other Ukrainian radicals, who together drew up a federalist and democratic program for remodelling Eastern Europe: the Volny Soyuz (English: Free Union. At this time, Drahomanov also aided in the publication of a geographical study of Ukraine by Élisée Reclus and publicised the Russian imperial prohibition of the Ukrainian language to Western European audiences. He also continued his involvement in Galician socialist politics, sending letters and articles to various publications and progressive political leaders, and keeping a close correspondence with his disciples Ivan Franko and Mykhailo Pavlyk.

By this time, Drahomanov's radical socialist politics were beginning to alienate other members of the Hromada, which had moved closer towards right-wing politics in the face of the increasingly reactionary political climate in Kyiv and was now worried that his radicalism might prevent the Russian government from loosening restrictions on the Ukrainian language. In 1886, the Hromada stopped providing Drahomanov with financial assistance, leaving him outcast and isolated.

=== Final years in Bulgaria (1889-1895) ===
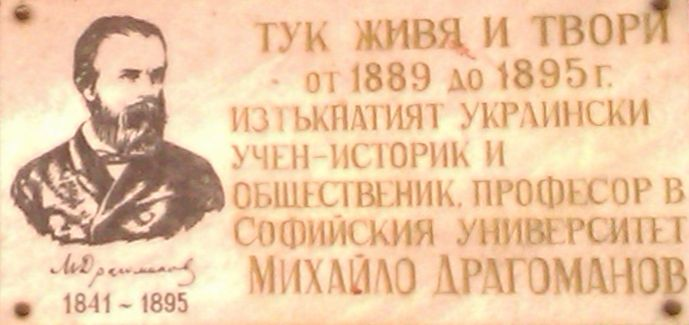
Memorial plaque dedicated to Drahomanov in Sofia

In 1889, while working on a history of Ukrainian literature, Drahomanov was invited by the government of Bulgaria to teach history for three years at the University of Sofia, once again providing him with financial security. Despite demands by the Russian imperial government to expel him and other "nihilists" from Bulgaria, in 1893, his contract was renewed for another three years. Drahomanov's time in Sofia was largely spent lecturing on ancient civilisations and studying Ukrainian folklore and literature, although he still maintained his collaboration with the radical press in his "second homeland" of Galicia. In his articles for the Galician press, he defended freedom of religion and campaigned for the secularization of Galician society, opposing the influence of clericalism in the region. He also wrote a number of works about the situation in Dnieper Ukraine, managing to win over Borys Hrinchenko to his own radical perspective.

Drahomanov's continuing radical journalism made enemies of the Polish nobility in Galicia, the Tsarist autocracy in Russia, which each accused him of being an agent for the other. He was also accused of revolutionary centralists in Russia and Galicia, as well as Ukrainian right-wing nationalists, of being an agent provocateur for the Russian Empire. Despite these accusations, he kept to his political convictions, upholding political freedom, self-determination and internationalism. With these principles in mind, he and his followers established the Ukrainian Radical Party, which helped spread and celebrate his ideas throughout Ukraine, despite the censorship of the Russian government. But by the time his ideas were beginning to receive widespread recognition, he was beginning to suffer from an abdominal aortic aneurysm, which left him with a fatal cardiovascular disease. On 20 June 1895, Mykhailo Drahomanov died shortly after giving a lecture at the University of Sofia. He was buried in the Central Sofia Cemetery.

== Works ==
Collections

- Historical Songs of the Ukrainian People (Kyiv, 1874–1875)
- Ukrainian Popular Legends and Tales (Kyiv, 1876)
- Political Songs of the Ukrainian People (Geneva, 1876)

Articles

- Review: "Primer for Use in the Folk Schools of the School District of Kyiv" (Kyiv, 1866)
- On the Question of Ukrainian Literature (Vienna, 1876)
- Ukrainian literature banned by the Russian government (Paris, 1878)
- Panslav Federalism (Grenoble, 1878)
- Political and Social Ideas in Ukrainian Folk Songs (Vienna, 1880)
- A Geographic and Historical Survey of Eastern Europe (Geneva, 1881)
- Program of the Hromada (Geneva, 1881)
- The Centralization of the Revolutionary Struggle in Russia (Geneva, 1882)
- Germany's Drive to the East and Moscow's Drive to the West (Geneva, 1882)
- Free Union (Geneva, 1884)
- Peculiar Thoughts on the Ukrainian National Cause (Lviv, 1891)
- Letters to Dnieper Ukraine (Lviv, 1893)
- Taming of the Shrew in the Folklore of the Ukraine (Chicago, 1893)
- The Lost Epoch (Published posthumously)

Journals

- Kievsky Telegraf [English: Kyiv Telegraph] (Kyiv, 1874–1875)
- Hromada [English: Community] (Geneva, 1876–1881)
- Volnoye Slovo [English: Free Word] (Geneva, 1881–1883)

== Personal life ==
Several members of Drahomanov's family were relevant in their own right. He was an uncle of Ukrainian poet Larysa Kosach (better known as Lesya Ukrainka), whose own education he contributed to, and he was a brother of the writer and ethnographer Olha Kosach (Olena Pchilka). With his wife, actress Liudmyla Drahomanova, he had a daughter, Lidia Shishmanova, who became the wife of the Bulgarian writer and politician Ivan Shishmanov.

== Political thought ==
In his political journalism, Drahomanov was both fiercely critical of the Ukrainian national movement while writing in the Ukrainian language and ardently defended Ukrainian self-determination while writing in the Russian language. As a result, he was denounced respectively as a socialist internationalist and as a bourgeois nationalist by both sides of the debate. His system of thought was based in an opposition to dogmatism, which led him to reject more rigid political philosophy that claimed to have solutions to all social issues. This resulted in his own political philosophy becoming syncretic, drawing from both liberalism and socialism; patriotism and cosmopolitanism; and Slavophilia and Westernism.

Drahomanov's politics centered freedom and dignity, concerning itself mainly with strengthening human rights and defending those rights from the State, as Drahomanov believed the expansion of liberty resulted from the limiting of government power by way of political revolution. He therefore considered the goal of mankind to be movement towards anarchy, a society based on free association and mutual aid. He was influenced directly by Pierre-Joseph Proudhon, who had formulated anarchism in opposition to the dominant theories of authoritarianism and centralism, in developing his own ideas on federalism. His other influences included Francesc Pi i Margall, John Stuart Mill, Édouard René de Laboulaye, Odilon Barrot, Charles Dupont-White and Benjamin Constant.

Drahomanov believed that true freedom could be accomplished through a federation of equal and autonomous individuals, groups and communities. In terms of state forms, he was intrigued most by the federative democracy in Switzerland and the constitutionalism in the United Kingdom. He had a negative opinion of the French Republic, as he believed the centralising tendency of the Jacobins had been counterrevolutionary and had ultimately resulted in the suppression of workers' rights to freedom of association. He was opposed to the concept of popular sovereignty, what he called the "autocracy of the people", represented in Jean-Jacques Rousseau's theory of the social contract. He believed that the idea of the "popular will" was diametrically opposed to political freedom, as the will of the people could be used to justify majority rule or even dictatorship, which endangered both individual and group rights.

== Legacy ==
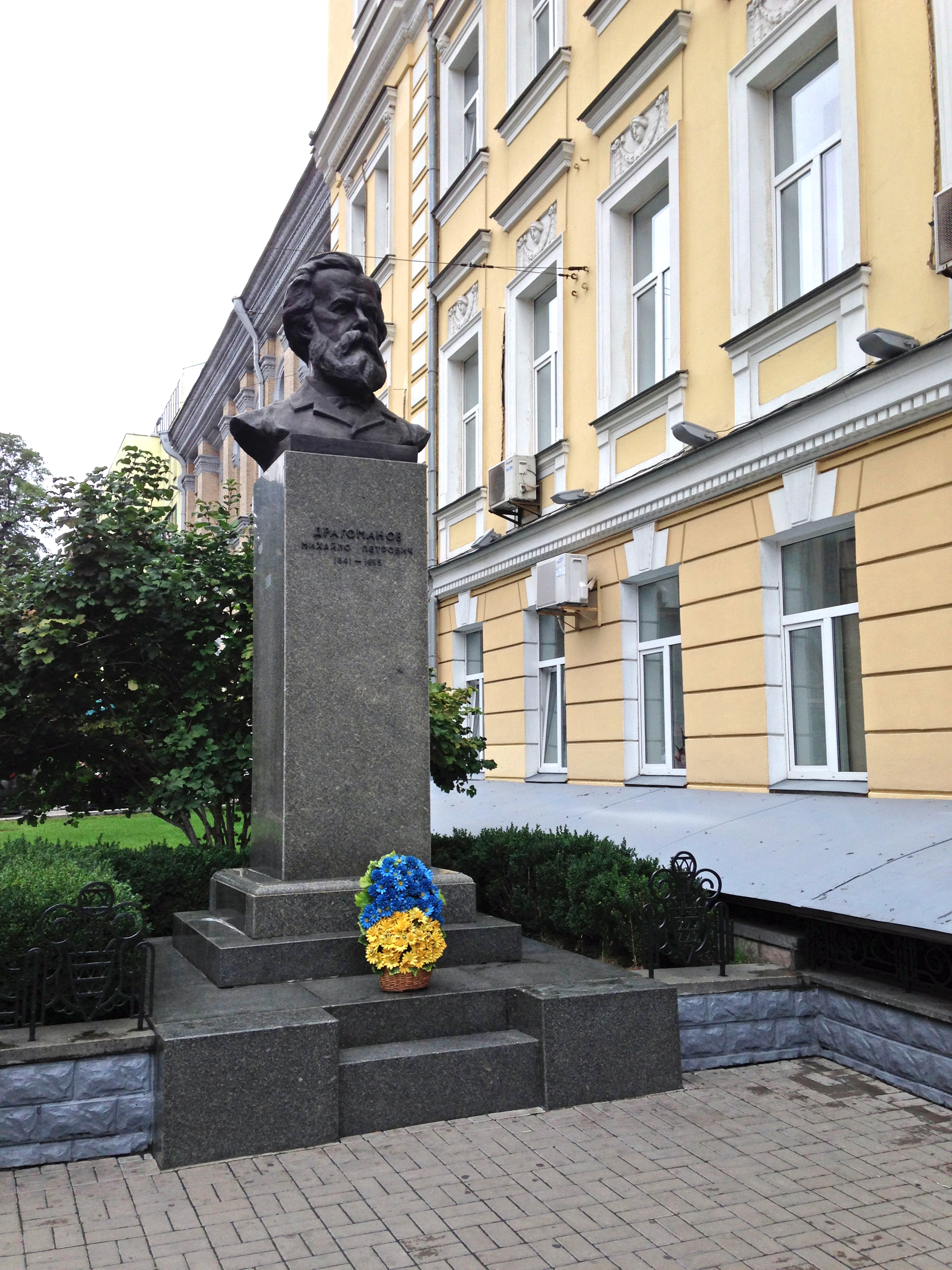
Bust of Drahomanov outside the National Pedagogical Drahomanov University.

Drahomanov was influential on the development of technical vocabulary in Ukrainian prose, particularly that of political terminology, for which he attempted to create uniquely Ukrainian neologisms, independent from both international terminology. Drahomanov also tried to popularize his own orthographic reform of the Ukrainian language, based on a simplified and rationalised version of Panteleimon Kulish's phonetic orthography, which was adopted by the writers Ivan Franko and Lesya Ukrainka.

Drahomanov spearheaded the development of independent Ukrainian political organisations in Galicia, the first of which was established in 1875 by his followers, but this was quickly suppressed by the imperial authorities. In October 1890, a coalition of Drahomanovite intellectuals and grass-roots peasant activists in Lviv established the first Ukrainian political party: the Ukrainian Radical Party, which defended Drahomanov's ethical socialism and declared its aim to be the independence of Ukraine. In 1899, moderates left the party and merged into the National Democratic Party, which represented the more liberal aspect of Drahomanov's thought. These two parties formed the basis of a two-party system in Galician Ukrainian politics, going on to lead the establishment of the West Ukrainian People's Republic after the dissolution of Austria-Hungary.

Drahomanov was not as influential in Dnieper Ukraine, which only attained freedom of association after the 1905 Revolution. Two eastern Ukrainian parties that adopted Drahomanov's program were the Socialist-Federalist Party and the Socialist-Revolutionary Party, which came to hold a strong influence in Ukraine following the 1917 Revolution. Drahomanov's ideas on multiculturalism influenced the constitution of the Ukrainian People's Republic (UPR) by the Central Council, which extended autonomy and self-governance to national minorities when it declared the independence of Ukraine. As it grew, the Ukrainian government used Drahomanov's federal model to guarantee regional autonomy, even proposing the reorganization of the entirety of Eastern Europe into a confederation of independent nations.

Following the collapse of the UPR, exiled Ukrainian nationalists shifted towards the far-right, with some directly blaming Drahomanov's ideas for their defeat in the Ukrainian War of Independence. In the Ukrainian Soviet Socialist Republic, Drahomanov was denounced as a liberal and a nationalist during the Stalinist period, but his ideas found a renewed interest following de-Stalinization and especially after the independence of Ukraine. In 1991, the former Kyiv Pedagogical Instituted named after Maxim Gorky was renamed as the Kyiv Pedagogical Drahomanov Institute. In 1997, the institute was granted "National University" status, being subsequently designated National Pedagogical Drahomanov University.

== Bibliography ==
- Doroshenko, Volodymyr (1952). "The Life of Mykhailo Drahomanov". In Rudyntsky, Ivan Lysiak (ed.). Mykhailo Drahomanov: A Symposium and Selected Writings. New York: Ukrainian Academy of Arts and Sciences. pp. 6–22. OCLC 461195833.
- Odarchenko, Petro (1952). "Drahomanov as Folklorist". In Rudyntsky, Ivan Lysiak (ed.). Mykhailo Drahomanov: A Symposium and Selected Writings. New York: Ukrainian Academy of Arts and Sciences. pp. 36–46. OCLC 461195833.
- Stakhiv, Matviy (1952). "Drahomanov's Impact on Ukrainian Politics". In Rudyntsky, Ivan Lysiak (ed.). Mykhailo Drahomanov: A Symposium and Selected Writings. New York: Ukrainian Academy of Arts and Sciences. pp. 47–62. OCLC 461195833.
- Rudnytsky, Ivan L. (1988) [1987]. "Various essays on Drahomanov". Essays in Modern Ukrainian History. Cambridge, Massachusetts: Harvard University Press. pp. 203–298. ISBN 9780916458195.
  - "Chapter 11: Drahomanov as a Political Theorist". Rudnytsky- Essays in Modern Ukrainian History. pp. 203–253.
  - "Chapter 12: The First Ukrainian Political Program: Mykhailo Drahomanovʼs "Introduction" to Hromada". Rudnytsky- Essays in Modern Ukrainian History. pp. 255–281.
  - "Chapter 13: Mykhailo Drahomanov and the Problem of Ukrainian-Jewish Relations". Rudnytsky- Essays in Modern Ukrainian History. pp. 283–298.
