= Embassy of Bulgaria, Kyiv =

Embassy of Bulgaria in Kyiv
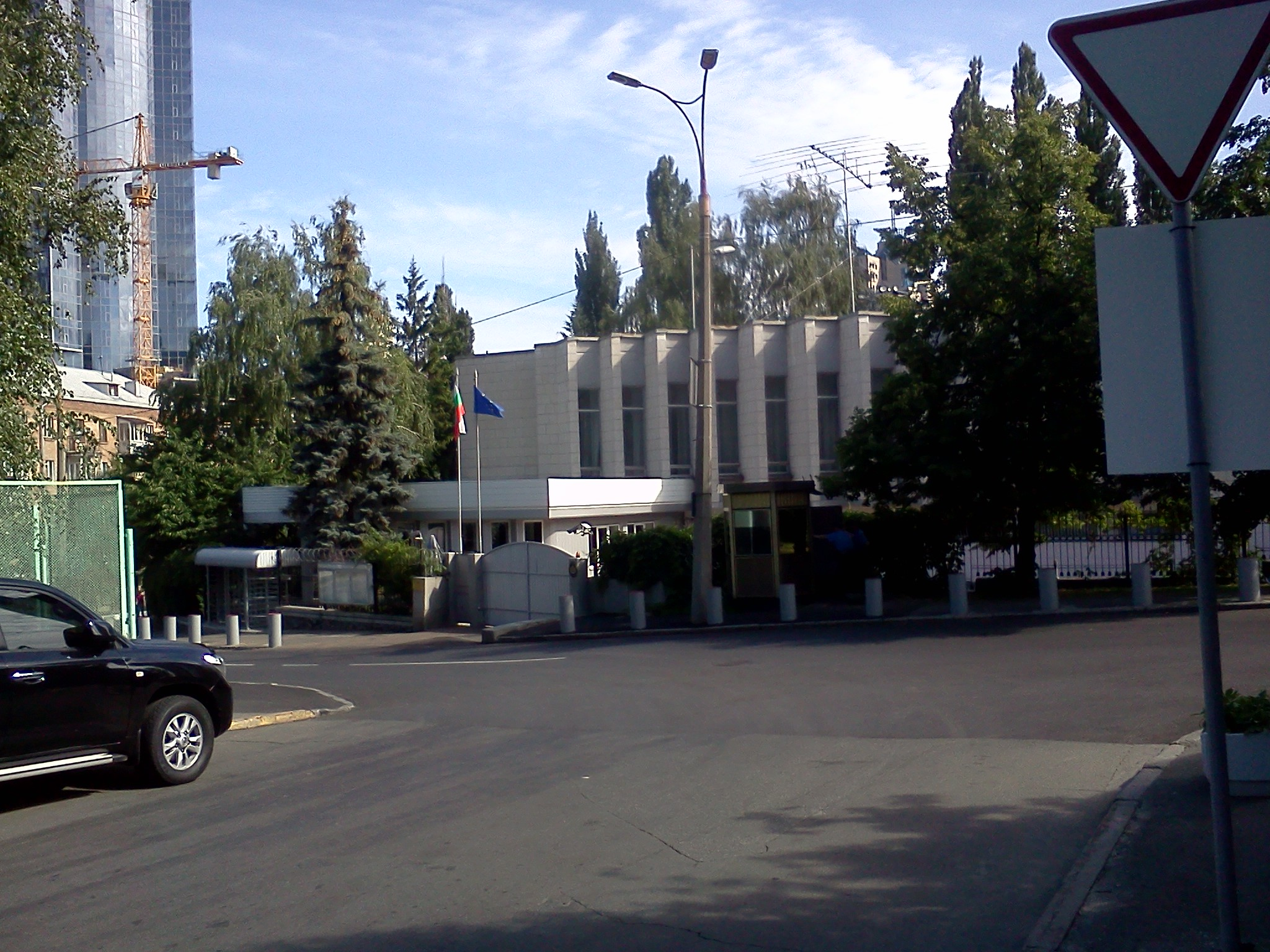
- Location: Kyiv
- Address: Hospitalna St., 1, Kyiv 01030, Ukraine
- Coordinates: 50.4373°N 30.5253°E
- Ambassador: Kostadin Kodzhabashev

The Embassy of Bulgaria in Kyiv is the diplomatic mission of Bulgaria in Ukraine.

In 2022, the embassy was temporarily closed due to the Russian invasion of Ukraine. In September 2022, the Embassy of Bulgaria resumed its work in Kyiv.

After Ukraine regained its independence on August 24, 1991, Bulgaria recognized Ukraine on December 5, 1991. On December 13, 1991, diplomatic relations were established between Ukraine and Bulgaria.

== Consulate General of the Republic of Bulgaria ==
- Consulate General of the Republic of Bulgaria in Odesa, Address: Posmitnyy St., 9, Odesa 65062, Ukraine
- Consulate General of the Republic of Bulgaria in Zaporizhia, Address: Khortytsia, 55, Zaporizhia 69017, Ukraine

== Previous Ambassadors ==
1. Ivan Shishmanov (1918-1919)
2. Dimitar Tserov (1992), Chargé d'Affaires ad interim
3. Peter Markov (1992-1998)
4. Alexander Dimitrov (1998-2002)
5. Angel Ganev (2002-2007)
6. Dimitar Vladimirov (2007-2012)
7. Krasimir Minchev (2012-2018)
8. Stoyana Rusinova, Chargé d'Affaires ad interim
9. Kostadin Tashev Kodzhabashev (2019-)

== See also ==
- Bulgaria-Ukraine relations
- Foreign relations of Bulgaria
- Foreign relations of Ukraine
- Embassy of Ukraine, Sofia
- Diplomatic missions in Ukraine
- Diplomatic missions of Bulgaria
