= Lidia Shishmanova =

Ukrainian and bulgarian writer and journalist

Lidia Shishmanova Лидия Шишманова
- Born: Lidia Drahomanova; 17 October 1866; Kyiv, Russian Empire
- Died: 7 February 1937 (aged 71); Sofia, Bulgaria
- Other names: Lydia Mikhailovna Shishmanova, Lydia Chichmanov, Lydia Schischmanoff, Lydia Schischmanov
- Citizenship: Bulgarian
- Known for: writer and journalist
- Spouse: Ivan Shishmanov
- Father: Mykhailo Drahomanov

Lidia Shishmanova (17 October 1866 – 7 February 1937) was a Ukrainian and Bulgarian writer, journalist, theatre and music critic, translator and social activist.

== Early life and family ==
Lidia Shishmanova was born Lidia Drahomanova, on 17 October 1866 in Kiev, Ukraine. Her father was a philosopher, historian, and folklorist Professor Mykhailo Drahomanov, and her mother a famous actress, Ludmila Drahomanova. Having received an education including other Western European languages, as well as theatre and music, Lidia also travelled extensively with her parents. She received a degree from the Faculty of Philology of the University of Geneva. On 28 December 1888, she married Ivan Shishmanov. They had one son, Dimitar Shishmanov. The couple moved to Bulgaria in 1889, where Shishmanova established herself as an active public figure in the areas of women's rights, the development of Bulgarian art and culture and presenting the cause of Bulgaria in Europe after the Balkan Wars.

== Writings and activism ==
Their home in Sofia became one of the main meeting places for Bulgarian intellectuals and those engaged in strengthening Bulgarian-Ukrainian relations. Amongst the visitors to their home were Ivan Vazov, Aleko Konstantinov, Ivan Radoslavov, and Michael Arnaoudov. In 1896, Shishmanova published a book in France as part of series entitled A collection of folk songs and tales. The series collected folk tales, songs and myths less studied or researched nations and ethnicities. She wrote for other Bulgarian publications such as Bulgarian review, Freedom of opinion, Bulgarian collection, Peace, Journal of Women, and Women's Voice. She wrote in Ukrainian for Ukraine, Rada, Dilo and New Ukraine. These pieces were reviews of theatre and music scene in Bulgaria and abroad.

Shishmanova wrote for the French newspaper La Bulgarie for many years, promoting Bulgarian culture, literature and arts. She wrote numerous articles on the politics in Bulgaria, Ukraine, the Balkans and Western Europe, as well on the scientific achievements of the time, and on women's rights in Bulgaria. Shishmanova was a member of the Association of Women with Higher Education, was a founder of the Club of the Bulgarian writers in 1930, and the League of English speakers, Society for Peace and Freedom where she served as the vice-president of the Bulgarian section of the International League for Peace and Freedom. She was also a member of the Bulgarian Women's Union and the Society of Esperanto in Bulgaria.

Shishmanova was a member of the board of St Patrick’s Orphanage in Sofia, which was founded by Pierce O'Mahony for Bulgarian orphans and the victims of the Ilinden–Preobrazhenie Uprising from Macedonia and Edirne. She was the vice-president of the first music company based in Sofia. Shishmanova died in Sofia on 7 February 1937.

== Legacy ==
Much of the advancement of women's rights in Bulgaria has been attributed to Shishmanova. In response to the then Higher School in Sofia (now Sofia University) not accepting women, she wrote the article The Woman and the university, which advocated for the rights of women to be educated for their own good, and that of wider society. In 1922, she campaigned against the unpopular Labour Service Act which required girls aged 16 to perform community service for a period of six months.

She advocated strongly with others for the development of Bulgarian theatre, aiding in the construction of a special building for the needs of the theatre in Sofia, and organising lectures by specialists before performances to prepare the public with information about the author, themes, or central ideas. Some of the reforms Shishmanova put forward in her articles were then picked up by Ivan Shishmanov during his tenure as Minister of Education in the Office of General Racho Petrov.

Bulgarian poet Dobri Nemirov dedicated a poem to Shishmanova and her legacy.
