= Shishmanoğlu family =

The Shishmanoğlu or Shishmanov family (Bulgarian: Шишманоглу or Шишманови) is a notable family of Bulgaria, Ottoman, Russian and Austrian Empire, who claim descent from a medieval Bulgarian Imperial House of Shishman.

== Origin of the family ==
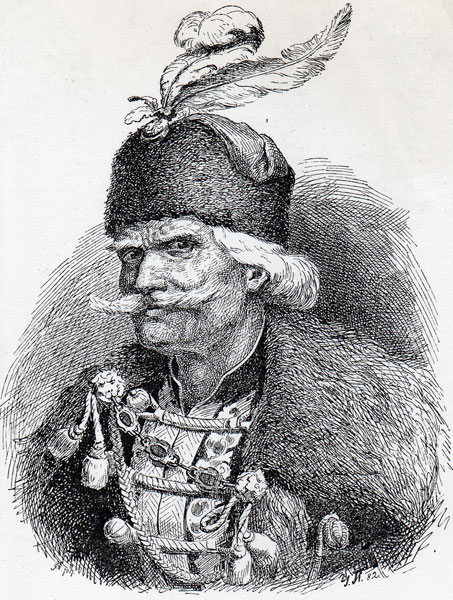
Baba Novak.

Members of the family claim that the genealogical links between the medieval and modern branches of the family have been extensively researched, but scholars are more doubtful.

The modern line of the Shishmanoğlu appears in the late 16th century with a legendary hajduk (brigand) Baba Novak, after a gap of over a century from the fall of Second Bulgarian Empire under the rule of the Ottoman Turks. It was usual among Balkan notable of the time to assume medieval surnames and claim descent from the famous noble houses of their glorious past. The origin of the founder of the family can be traced to the village of Poreč (today Donji Milanovac, Serbia) on an island on the Danube. According to some scholars, the name Shishman is a Turkish translation of the nickname Debeljak (means Fat man) which Novak was known.

== Rebellion against the Turks ==
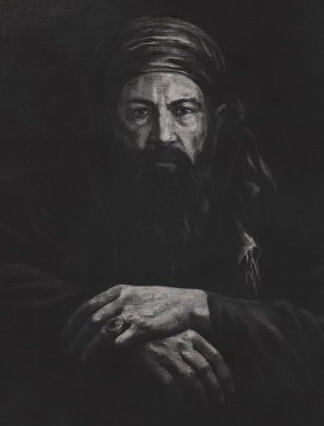
Rostislav Stratimirovic.

Novak was born in 1530s and in his early years studied at the monastery of Poreč. Afterward he began his career as a hajduk at an early age after he was imprisoned and beaten by Turks, that led him to leave his birthplace and take refuge in the forests of the Timok Valley where he quickly learned the use of weapons and military from a harambaš Hajduk. He soon formed his četa (band of hajduks) and started a violent fight against the Turks. His strong personality and military prowess made him a man of many followers and his guerrillas became a strong fighting force. He joined the forces of Michael the Brave in Banat with 2000 hajduks for the liberation of the Vlach lands and was made captain of the Brigands. In 1601 he was captured by the enemies of Prince Michael, sentenced to death and executed. After his death he is venerated as a hero Starina Novak in the Serb epic poetry and in Bulgarian and Romanian tales. According to the legend Novak had two sons Grujica and Sratsimir (Tatomir), who also fought with the Turks.

The next important member of the family Shishmanoğlu was a son of Sratsimir Rostislav, who claimed the title Prince of Tarnovo and was a leader of Second Tarnovo Uprising. In 1686 he left for Russia, intending to gain support in the rebellion. At Moscow he met Russian Orthodox Patriarch Joachim and asked him for help. Upon the start of the Russo-Turkish War (1686–1700), the rebellion broke out prematurely in the old Bulgarian capital of Tarnovo. Rostislav returned to Ottoman Bulgaria, but the Ottoman forces were much greater and the rebellion was suppressed. After many adventures he went back to Moscow, where he finally married to the niece of the patriarch and gave the foundations of the Russian noble family Saveliev–Rostislavic.

== Establishment in Vidin ==
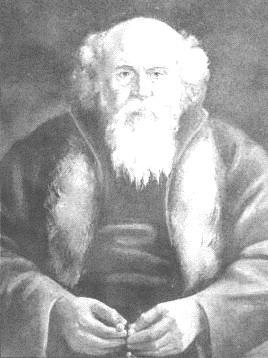
Emmanuel Shishmanoğlu.

In 1592 Grujica settled in the Bulgarian town of Vidin which in the Middle Ages was the residence of the Shishman Imperial dynasty. His successors are engaged in tailoring, while the marriage of a one their girl with influential Bosnian janissar, give unexpected rise of the family. In 1794 their grandson Osman Pazvantoğlu became governor of the Vidin district and a rebel against Ottoman rule. When Osman runs, he delegated his financial affairs of his cousin Emmanuel Shishmanoğlu, who accumulate great wealth. Emmanuel developed a finance house by installing each of his four sons in the main economic centres in Ottoman and Austrian Empires. Unlike the Christian usurers of earlier centuries, who had financed and managed Turkish noble houses, but often lost their wealth through violence or expropriation, the system created by the Shishmanoğlu was impervious to local attacks. Their assets were held in financial instruments, circulating through the world as stocks, bonds and debts. The skills of Emmanuel allowed them to insulate their property from local violence. They managed to maintain their privileges after the death of Pazvantoğlu and even they are given the title Çorbacı.

In 1850, however, the sons of Emmanuel support a large uprising in Vidin, because they hope to restore autonomy to the district and to become its princes. Punishment were expelled from the town and their business is destroyed.

== Political success ==
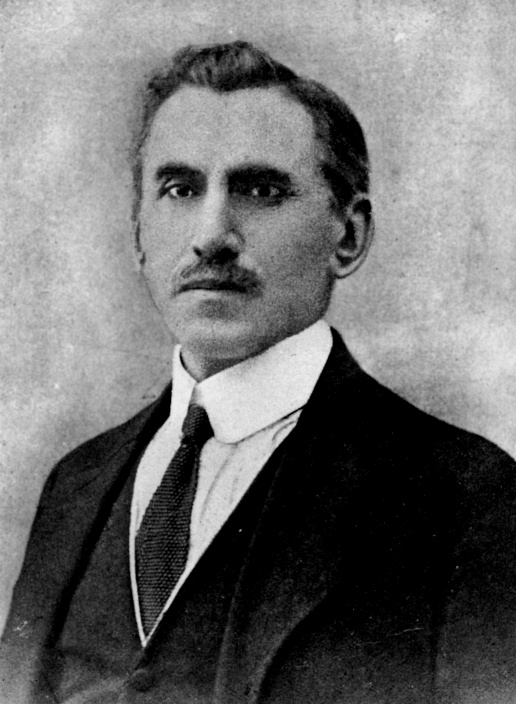
Prof. Ivan Shishmanov.

After the Liberation of Bulgaria from Ottoman rule, the family enter into the political life of the country. The son of Emmanuel, Alexander Shishmanov was elected to mayor of the town of Svishtov. Other family members are politics and diplomats too. Of these the most famous is Dr. Assen Shishmanov and Prof. Ivan Shishmanov.

In 1884 Ivan Shishmanov went abroad to study, attending over the years the universities of Jena, Geneva, and Leipzig. He became a professor at the University of Sofia in 1894. From 1903 to 1907 he served as Bulgaria’s minister of education. Shishmanov was the first Bulgarian scholar to study literature from the point of view of culture and social history. He did considerable research on writers and cultural figures of the Bulgarian national renaissance of the period 1750 to 1878. His works include writings on Bulgaria’s literary ties with Russia and Ukraine and a series of lectures on comparative Western European literatures in the 18th century.

Dimiter Shishmanov, the son of Ivan Shishmanov also involved in politics and became Minister of Foreign Affairs during the Second World War. As a minister he supported Bulgaria's entry into Tripartite Pact and after the war was executed by the communists.

== Family tree ==
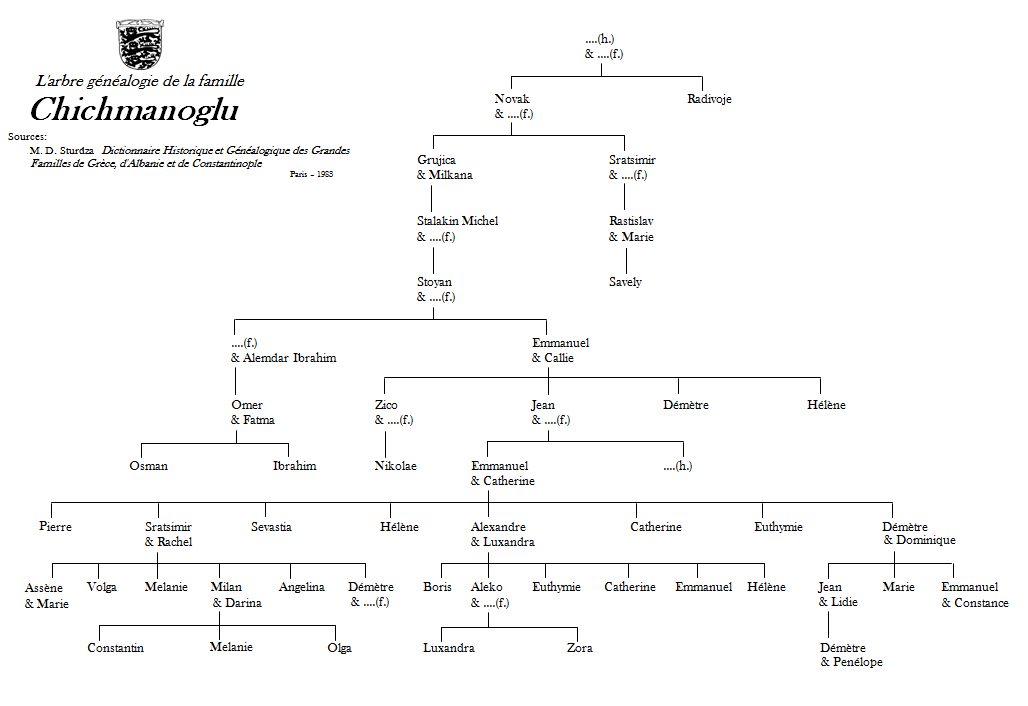
Family tree of the Shishmanoğlu
