= Eduard Stoyanov =

Ukrainian footballer

Personal information
- Full name: Eduard Mykolayovych Stoyanov
- Date of birth: 29 June 1972 (age 54)
- Place of birth: Zorya, Sarata Raion, Odesa Oblast, Ukrainian SSR, Soviet Union (now Kamchyk, Bilhorod-Dnistrovskyi Raion, Odesa Oblast, Ukraine)
- Position: Defender

Senior career*
Years	Team	Apps	(Gls)
1990	Zorya Luhansk	13	(0)
1991	Khimik Sieverodonetsk	7	(0)
1991–1992	SC Odesa	27	(0)
1992–1993	CSK ZSU Kyiv	7	(1)
1993	→ Nyva-Borysfen Myronivka (loan)	4	(2)
1993	Boryspil	3	(0)
1995–1996	SC Odesa	14	(5)
1997	SKA-Lotto Odesa	14	(11)
1998	Chornomorets Odesa	2	(0)
1999	SC Odesa	1	(0)
1999	Chornomorets Odesa	7	(1)
1999	→ Chornomorets-2 Odesa	10	(0)
2000–2001	Ionikos	6	(0)
- * Club domestic league appearances and goals

Eduard Mykolayovych Stoyanov (Ukrainian: Едуард Миколайович Стоянов; born 29 June 1972) is a Ukrainian retired footballer.
