= Embassy of Ukraine, Sofia =

Embassy of Ukraine in the Republic of Bulgaria
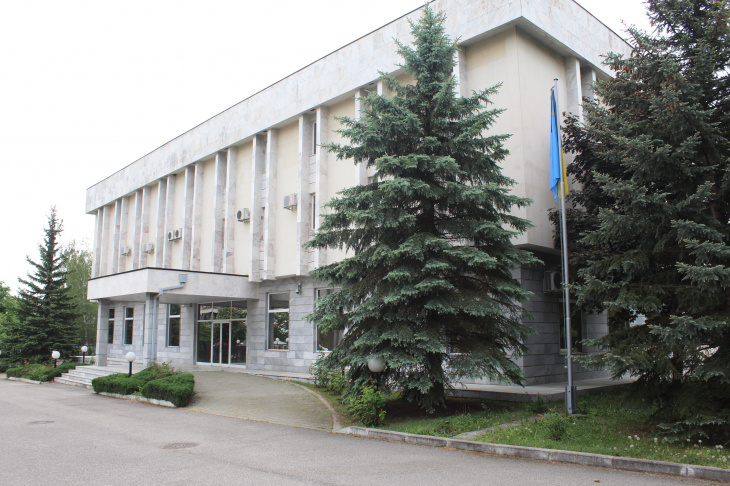
- Location: Sofia, Bulgaria
- Address: 29, Boryana St., Sofia, 1618, Bulgaria
- Coordinates: 42°40′27″N 23°15′40″E
- Ambassador: Olesya Ilashchuk
- Website: bulgaria.mfa.gov.ua

The Embassy of Ukraine, Sofia is an embassy located in Sofia, Bulgaria. It is hosts the primary diplomatic mission from Ukraine to the Republic of Bulgaria.

== History of diplomatic relations between Bulgaria and Ukraine ==
Ukraine and Bulgaria first established diplomatic relations on February 9, 1918, with the signing of the Treaty of Brest-Litovsk during the First World War. The treaty was signed between the Soviet Union (which had recently come to power after overthrowing the tsarist government of the Russian Empire) and the Central Powers (The German Empire, the Austro-Hungarian Empire, the Ottoman Empire, and the Kingdom of Bulgaria). The Soviet Union agreed to withdraw Russian troops from the Eastern Front of the war and make peace with the Central Powers. Part of the agreement was the establishment of diplomatic relations between the governments of the Central Powers and the governments of the newly independent Eastern European republics that had gained independence from Russia during the Russian Revolution. One of these newly independent Eastern Europeans states was the Ukrainian People's Republic. Thus, the treaty caused Bulgaria and Ukraine to establish diplomatic ties. Oleksandr Shulhin, a prominent Ukrainian politician, became the first Ukrainian ambassador to Bulgaria. The diplomatic relations were ultimately short lived, as the Ukrainian People's Republic was eventually forced to join the Soviet Union in 1922. Coming under supremacy from Moscow once again, Ukraine was forced to break off the diplomatic relations it had established during its brief experience with independence. Bulgaria and Ukraine re-established diplomatic relations on December 13, 1991, shortly after Ukraine gained independence from the Soviet Union and became the modern sovereign state known as the Republic of Ukraine. The two countries have enjoyed positive and productive relations ever since 1991. Bulgaria, as a member of the European Union, has supported Ukraine in its efforts to become closer with the EU and with Western Europe in general.

Bulgaria supported Ukraine's sovereignty over the Crimean Peninsula during the annexation of Crimea by the Russian Federation in 2014. During the crisis, then President of Bulgaria, Rosen Plevneliev, stated "Bulgaria is for preserving the sovereignty, the territorial integrity and the democratic future of Ukraine."

In addition to the Ukrainian embassy in Sofia, a Bulgarian embassy was established in the Capital of Ukraine, Kyiv (see Embassy of Bulgaria, Kyiv). The two countries also have consulate-generals in each others' borders. Bulgaria maintains a consulate-general in Odesa and Ukraine maintains a consulate-general in Varna. The Ukrainian embassy in Sofia provides various consular services, such as "visa, passport, document legalization [and] emergency travel assistance". The embassy's stated purpose is to "help the government of Ukraine to maintain cordial economic, political, cultural, social and other transnational ties with the government of Bulgaria."

== Known ambassadors from Ukraine to Bulgaria ==
- Oleksandr Shulhin (July 1918 - December 1918)
- Baltazhy Mykola (April 26, 2011 - July 13, 2018)
- Moskalenko Vitalii (July 13, 2018 - 2022)
- Olesia Ilashchuk (from December 23, 2022)

== See also ==
- Foreign relations of Bulgaria
- Foreign relations of Ukraine
- List of diplomatic missions in Bulgaria
- List of diplomatic missions of Ukraine
