= Austria–NATO relations =

Austria – NATO relations
- NATO: Austria

Austria and the North Atlantic Treaty Organization (NATO) have a close relationship. Austria, Ireland, Cyprus and Malta are the only members of the European Union that are not members of NATO. Austria has had formal relations with NATO since 1995, when it joined the Partnership for Peace programme. Austria has a policy of neutrality enshrined in its constitution, and has not sought to join NATO. Following at the 2022 Russian invasion of Ukraine and the accession of Finland and Sweden to NATO, public support in Austria for a potential NATO membership application remains quite low.

== History ==
Map showing European membership of the EU and NATO EU member only NATO member only member of both

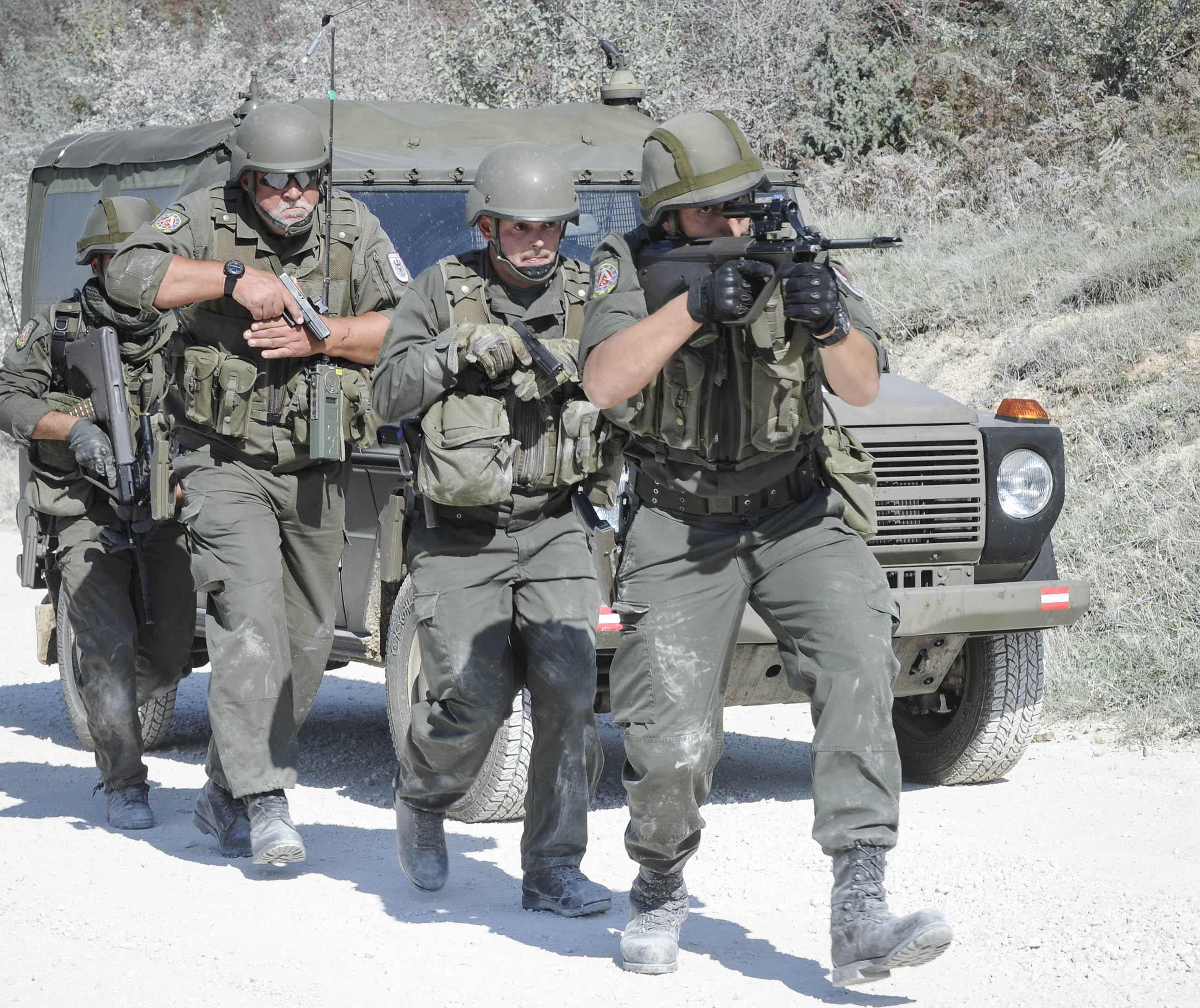
Austria's neutrality is enshrined in law and treaty, but it participates in peacekeeping missions like Operation Althea in Bosnia and Herzegovina.

Austria was occupied by the four victorious Allied powers following World War II under the Allied Control Council, similar to Germany. During negotiations to end the occupation, which were ongoing at the same time as Germany's, the Soviet Union insisted on the reunified country adopting the model of Swiss neutrality. The US feared that this would encourage West Germany to accept similar Soviet proposals for neutrality as a condition for German reunification. Shortly after West Germany's accession to NATO, the parties agreed to the Austrian State Treaty in May 1955, which was largely based on the Moscow Memorandum signed the previous month between Austria and the Soviet Union. While the treaty itself did not commit Austria to neutrality, this was subsequently enshrined into Austria's constitution that October with the Declaration of Neutrality. The Declaration prohibits Austria from joining a military alliance, from hosting foreign military bases within its borders, and from participating in a war.

Membership of Austria in the European Union (or its predecessor organizations) was controversial due to the Austrian commitment to neutrality. Austria only joined in 1995, together with two Nordic countries that had also declared their neutrality in the Cold War (Finland and Sweden). Austria joined NATO's Partnership for Peace in 1995, and participates in NATO's Euro-Atlantic Partnership Council. The Austrian military also participates in the United Nations peacekeeping operations and has deployments in several countries as of 2022, including Kosovo, Lebanon, and Bosnia and Herzegovina, where it has led the EUFOR mission there from 2009 until January 2025.

== Austria's NATO membership debate ==
NATO member states In the process of accession Promised invitations Membership is not the goal Have not announced their membership intentions

NATO members and partners in Europe NATO member states Membership Action Plan countries Intensified Dialogue countries Individual Partnership Action Plan countries Partnership for Peace members Aspiring Partnership for Peace members

Wolfgang Schüssel, Chancellor from 2000 to 2007 from the Austrian People's Party (ÖVP), supported NATO membership as part of European integration.

Following the Russian invasion of Ukraine, and subsequent decision by Finland and Sweden to abandon decades of non-alignment and apply to join NATO, there has been renewed debate in Austria on joining the bloc, similar to how Austria joined the EU alongside Finland and Sweden. On May 8, 2022, a coalition of politicians, diplomats, artists and business-people wrote an open letter to the Austrian government asking them to review their commitment to neutrality, however, the only party to openly support the effort was NEOS with just 15 of the 183 seats in the National Council. Conservative politician Andreas Khol, the 2016 presidential nominee from the ÖVP, has also argued in favor of NATO membership for Austria. However, Austrian Chancellor Karl Nehammer stated that the country would continue its policy of neutrality. On 10 July 2024, Austrian Foreign Minister Alexander Schallenberg said that Austria was not considering joining NATO, but planned to cooperate with the alliance. In July 2025, Austrian Foreign Minister Beate Meinl-Reisinger expressed openness to the country becoming a NATO member, stating that "although there are currently no majorities in parliament and in the population for joining NATO, such a debate can still be very fruitful."

=== Opinion polls on Austrian membership of NATO ===
Membership is not widely popular with the Austrian public. According to a survey in April 2023 by the Austrian Society for European Politics, only 21% of Austrians surveyed supported joining NATO, while 60% were opposed.

Opinion polls on Austrian membership of NATO
Dates conducted	Pollster	Sample size	Support	Oppose	Neutral or DK	Lead	Ref.
7 March 2024	Sweden accedes to NATO						
11–13 April 2023	Austrian Society for European Politics	1000	21%	60%	19%	39%	
4 April 2023	Finland accedes to NATO						
18 May 2022	Finland and Sweden applied for NATO membership						
6–12 May 2022	APA	1000	14%	75%	11%	59%	
3-4 March 2022	Austrian Society for European Politics	500	17%	64%	19%	47%	
24 February 2022	Russia invades Ukraine						
15-21 March 2021	Austrian Society for European Politics	1000	23%	62%	15%	39%	
16 March 2014	Russia annexes Crimea						
7 August 2008	Russia invades Georgia						
July 1996	IMAS research institute	?	16%	63%	21%	47%	
July 1995	IMAS research institute	?	18%	70%	12%	58%	

== Relationship timeline ==
Event	Date
Partnership for Peace	1995-02-10

== Austria's foreign relations with NATO member states ==
- Albania
- Belgium
- Bulgaria
- Canada
- Croatia
- Czech Republic
- Denmark
- Estonia
- Finland
- France
- Germany
- Greece
- Hungary
- Iceland
- Italy
- Latvia
- Lithuania
- Luxembourg
- Montenegro
- Netherlands
- North Macedonia
- Norway
- Poland
- Portugal
- Romania
- Slovakia
- Slovenia
- Spain
- Sweden
- Turkey
- United Kingdom
- United States

== See also ==
- Foreign relations of Austria
- Foreign relations of NATO
- Enlargement of NATO
- Partnership for Peace
- NATO open door policy
- Declaration of Neutrality
- Neutral member states in the European Union
- Accession of Austria to the European Union
- European Union–NATO relations

=== NATO relations of other EU member states outside NATO ===
- Cyprus–NATO relations
- Ireland–NATO relations
- Malta–NATO relations
