= Austria–Nepal relations =

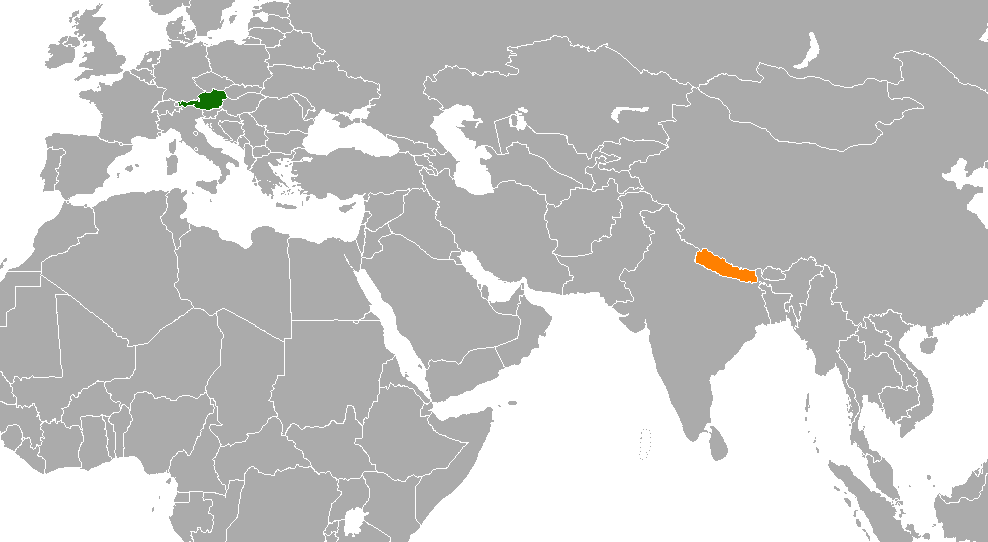
- Austria: Nepal

Austria–Nepal relations refers to bilateral foreign relations between Austria and Nepal.

Austria–Nepal relations were officially established on 15 August 1959. Nepal has an embassy in Vienna and Austria has an Honorary Consulate in Kathmandu.

== See also ==
- Foreign relations of Austria
- Foreign relations of Nepal
- Nepalis in Austria
