= Tain (village) =

Village in Haryana

Coordinates: 28°05′35″N 77°03′20″E

Tain is a village located in the tehsil of Nuh in the Nuh district of the state of Haryana, India. The village was in the news when Nokia decided to develop 500 smart villages in India. As per the company, the project will focus on the five key areas of health, education, livelihood, governance and finance. Nina Vaskunlahti, Ambassador of Finland, inaugurated Tain village. It was planned that village will serve as hubs which will host a digital centre with telecom connectivity to provide ICT-enabled, primary services across each of the five pillars to rural community.

== Project Smartpur ==
Smartpur was a basically rural entrepreneurship-based model created to develop ideal smart villages in India. It was commenced by New Delhi-based Digital Empowerment Foundation and assisted by Nokia. It was a one-year pilot project based on a hub-and-spoke model. Keeping this motivation, DEF and Nokia have initiated Smartpur in Tain in Haryana. It also included Asoor in Tamil Nadu for the pilot project. Both, Tain and Asoor, have been identified as hub villages and linked to nine spoke villages each.

== Participation of Nokia ==
Nokia with its participation in the Smartpur project said it aims to create a sustainable ecosystem in villages where people can leverage digital tools to bring information, ease of access to various government services, economic prosperity for households, transparency in governance, and efficiency in daily lives. The project was outlined under the five key areas of development - health, education, livelihood, governance and finance - to build a holistic, digitally integrated village. During the first phase of the project, 20 villages were planned to integrate digitally in Haryana and Tamil Nadu. It was a valuable step in that direction which will integrate these villages and rural communities, providing digital tools and Internet connectivity for social and economic impact.

== Demographic ==
As per the Census of 2011 by the Government of India, the location code number is 063143. The overall area of the village is 601 hectares with number of households 694. The total population of the village is 5015 in which 2609 are males & 2406 are females. The population in the village of age group 0-6 is 1239. It has total 110 Scheduled Castes. The village has 1872 literates & 3143 illiterates.

== Geography ==
The people in the village use Hindi & Punjabi for communication. Tain PIN code is 122107 and postal head office is Nuh.

== Surrounding Villages ==
The nearby villages are Sudaka, Dhanduka, Tarakpur, Babupur Nuh, Satputiaka, Salaheri, Jogipur, Dundaheri Nuh, Palla, Palri.
