= Austria–Vietnam relations =

- Austria: Vietnam

Foreign relations exist between Austria and Vietnam. Austria has an embassy in Hanoi. Vietnam has an embassy in Vienna. Diplomatic relations were established in 1972.

== High level visits ==
Austrian President Heinz Fischer visited Vietnam in May 2012.

== Trade ==
Bilateral trade has experienced significant growth over recent years. It reached US$630 million in 2011, a year on year increase of 240 per cent, and $171 million in the first quarter of 2012. By 2022, bilateral trade reached US$2.8 billion.

== Resident diplomatic missions ==
- Austria has an embassy in Hanoi.
- Vietnam has an embassy in Vienna.
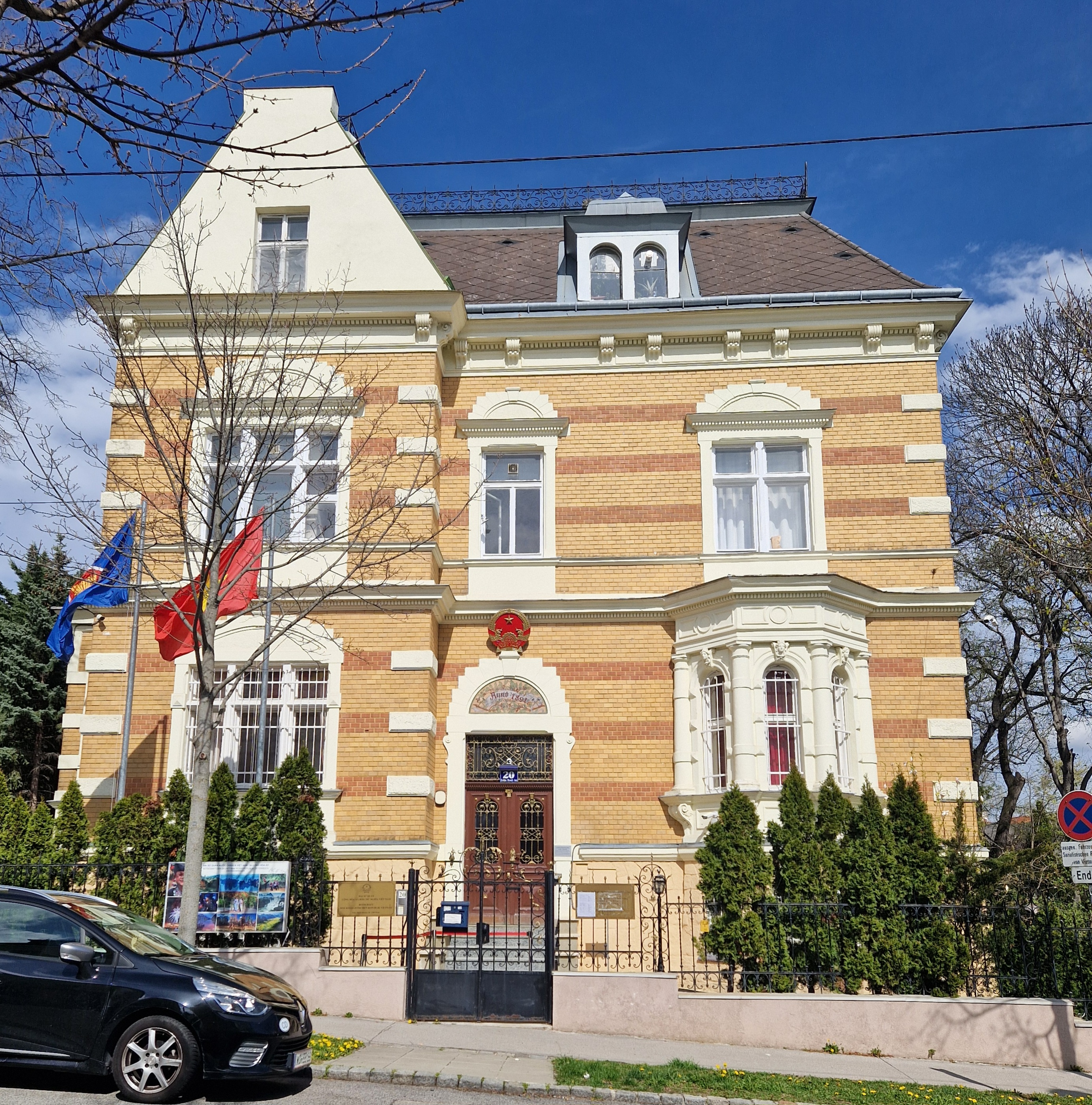
Embassy of Vietnam in Vienna

== See also ==
- Foreign relations of Austria
- Foreign relations of Vietnam
