= Austria–China relations =

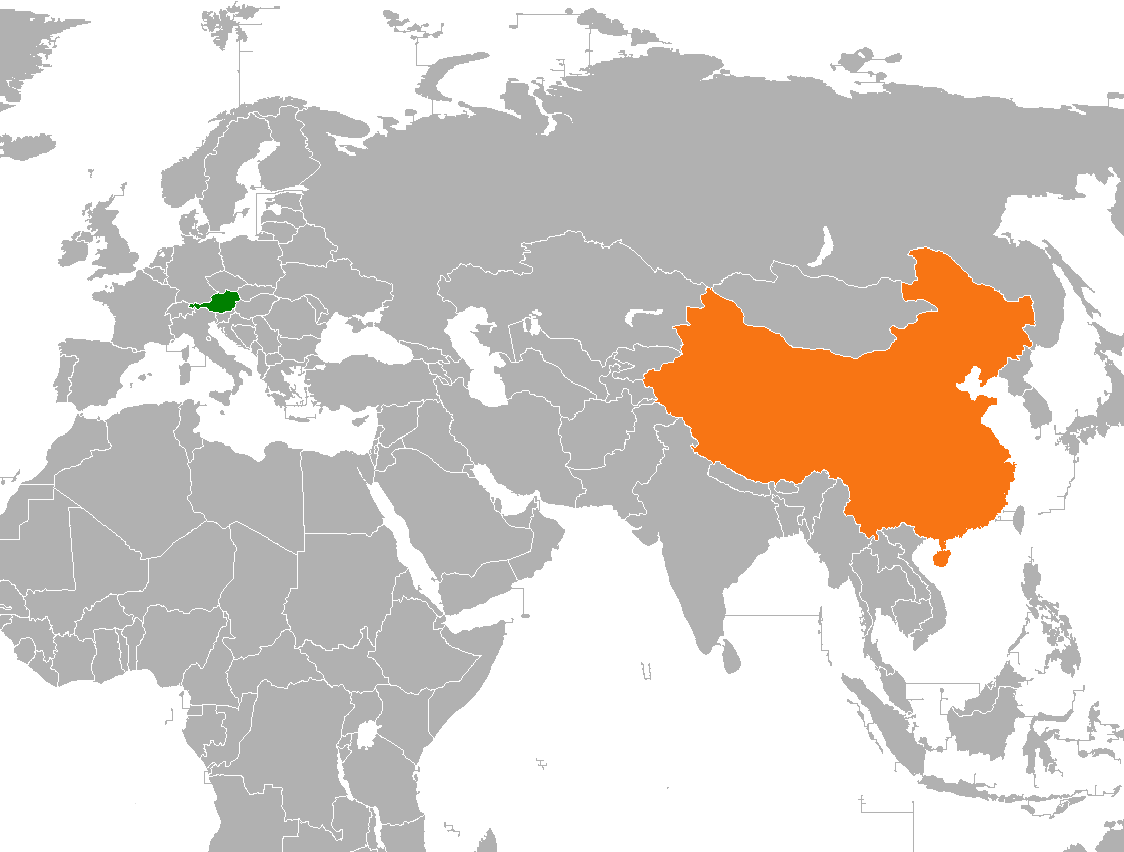
- Austria: China

Austria established diplomatic relations with the People's Republic of China in May 1971. Austria holds an embassy in Beijing, and China holds an embassy in Vienna. There are also two Confucius Institutes in Austria in Vienna and Graz.

Austria's foreign policy opposite China is strongly oriented on the European Union's relationship with China. The EU sees China as "a partner for cooperation, an economic competitor and a systemic rival." Austria's Foreign Ministry has on multiple occasions referred to this position as its guiding definition for its own China policy.

== History ==
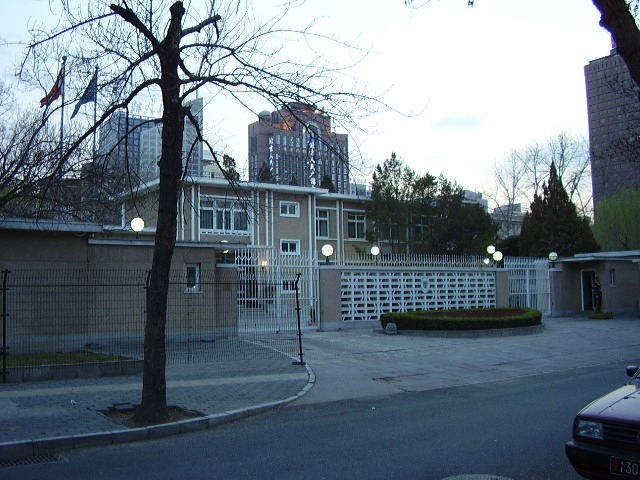
Embassy of Austria, Beijing

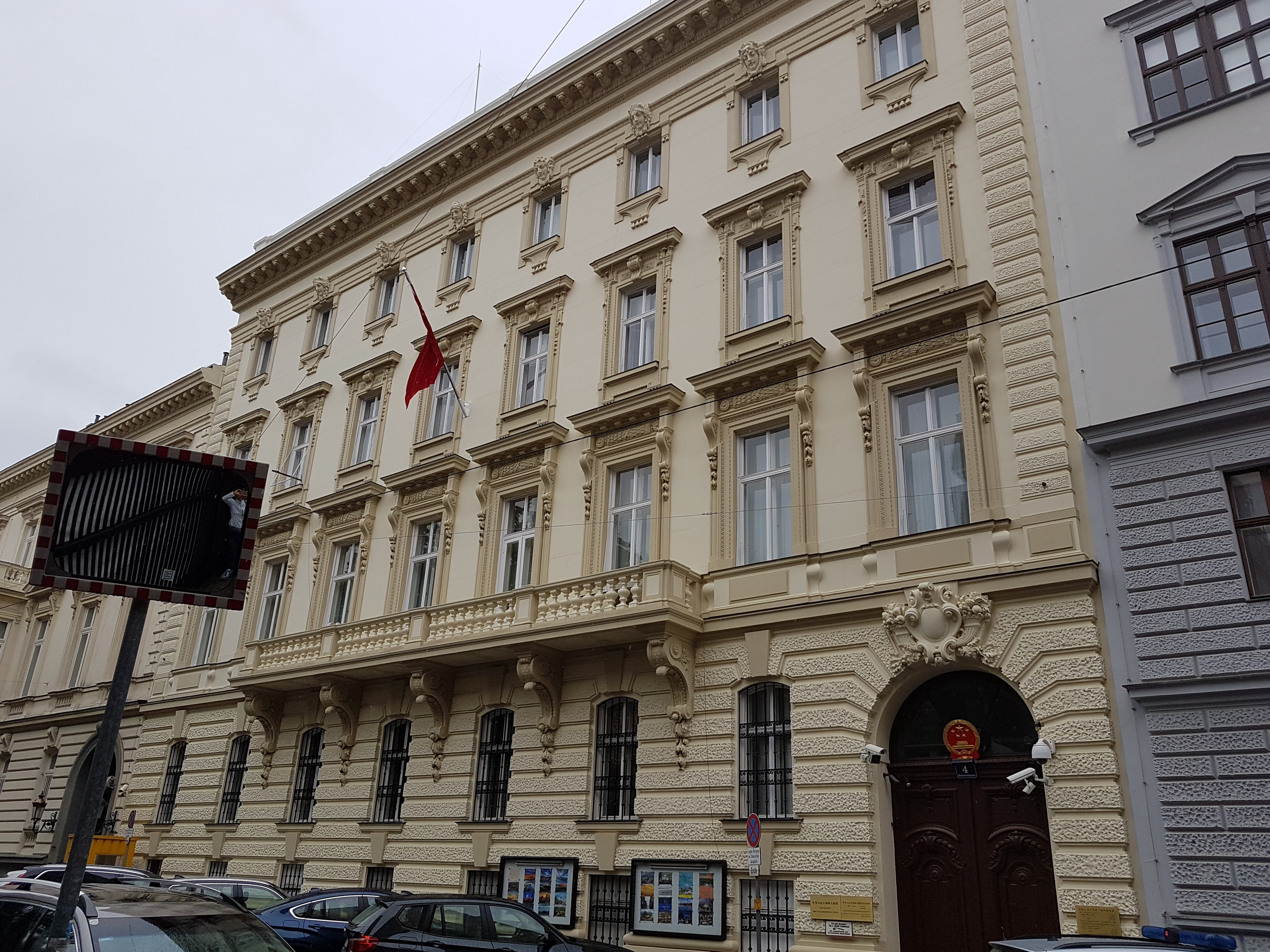
Embassy of China, Vienna

In 1869, Austria-Hungary established diplomatic relations with the Qing dynasty.

=== Austro-Hungarian concession of Tianjin ===
The Austro-Hungarian concession of Tianjin (Chinese: 天津奥租界; pinyin: Tiānjīn ào zūjiè, German: österreichisch-ungarische Konzession, Hungarian: Osztrák–magyar tiencsini koncesszió) was a territory (concession) in the Chinese city of Tientsin occupied by Austria-Hungary between 1902 and 1920. It had been obtained by Austria-Hungary after the signing of the Boxer Protocol at the conclusion of the conflict between China and the Alliance of Eight Nations, which had sent an international expeditionary force to quell the Boxer Rebellion of 1901. Although the Austro-Hungarian occupation corps had been present from the previous year, the concession formally began on 27 December 1902. It is the shortest lived concession, having existed for only 14 years.

Austria-Hungary was a part of the Eight-Nation Alliance which put down the Boxer Rebellion, and as a signatory of the Boxer Protocol gained a concession in Tianjin alongside the other members of the alliance. The concession would be regained by China with the dissolution of Austria-Hungary in World War I.

=== Cold War ===
Austria officially recognized the People's Republic of China on 28 May 1971.

== Human rights ==
Austrian officials have repeatedly criticized China for its violation of human rights, particularly regarding minority groups. On the occasion of a 2011 visit of China's President Hu Jintao, the later Austrian President Alexander Van der Bellen said: "The considerable human rights violations in China must be brought to the table and must not be swept under the carpet out of supposed fear for Austria's economic interests. As a member of the UN Human Rights Council, the Austrian government has taken up the cause of protecting religious freedom. It must not suddenly forget this in its relations with China, but must stand up for religious minorities, freedom of expression and human rights."

In 2021, a parliamentary resolution supported by all parties, condemned human rights violations against the Uyghurs and other minorities in the Xinjiang province and demanded European Union sanctions against the Chinese government.

When the European Union implemented sanctions in March 2021, Austria's Foreign Minister Alexander Schallenberg said he approved of the step and called it an "important signal."

== Economic relations ==
China is among the top 5 of Austria's most important economic partners regarding direct trade relations and also crucial for Austria's economy through its trade with the European Union and Austria's most important economic partner Germany.

Belt and Road Initiative

In April 2018, Austria and China signed an agreement to advance cooperation, and for Austria to join the Belt and Road Initiative. Austria did however end up not signing a Belt and Road agreement.

== See also ==
- Foreign relations of Austria
- Foreign relations of China
