= Austria–Kenya relations =

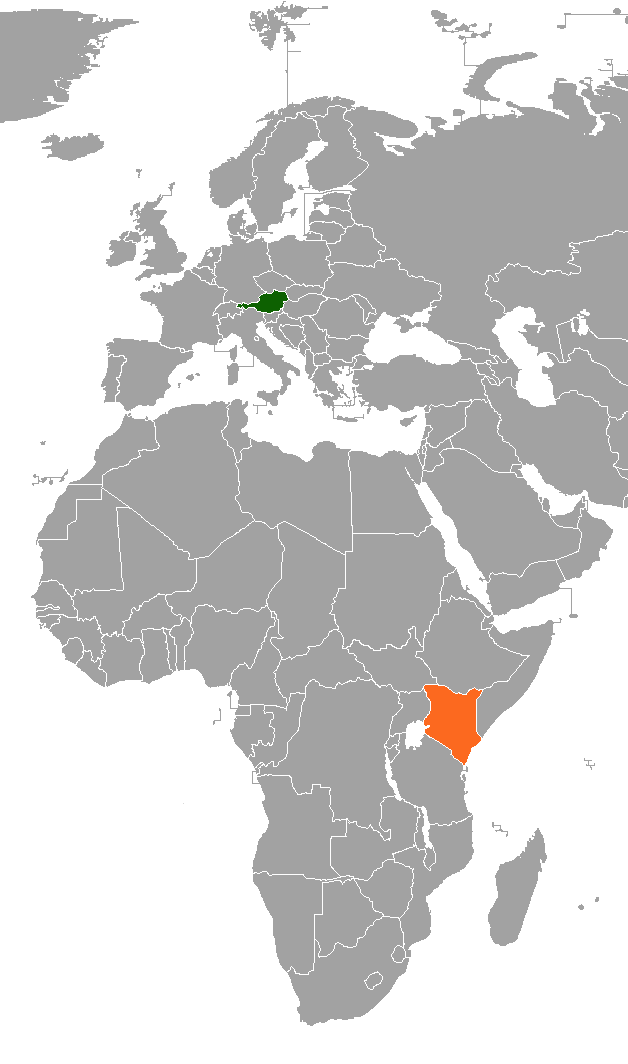
- Austria: Kenya

Bilateral relations exist between Austria and Kenya.

== History ==
Official ties between Kenya and Austria started in 1908 when Austria-Hungary opened an Honorary Consulate in the coastal city of Mombasa. It ended up being closed on the onset of WWI in 1914.

Austria was amongst the first countries to recognise Kenya's independence in 1963. In late 1964 it was decided that an Austrian Embassy should be opened in Nairobi. It was opened in April 1965 and in 1971 the Honorary Consulate in Mombasa was reopened but it is currently closed.

Kenya's mission in Austria was opened in 1994. It handles many matters concerning the UN since Vienna is host to a few major UN organisations such as the IAEA and UNODC.

In late 2018, President Kenyatta visited Austria for the Africa-Europe Forum in Vienna. He met with and held talks with the President of Austria Van der Bellen. The talks mostly centered on wildlife conservation and renewable energy development.

== Trade ==
In 2011 trade between Kenya and Austria was worth about KES. 3.265 billion (EUR. 27.98 million). Austria exported goods worth KES. 2.3 billion to Kenya in 2011 and Kenya exported goods worth KES. 965.7 million.

Kenya's main exports to Austria include: Fresh cut flowers. There are also other import items like fruits, vegetables, coffee and tea.

Austria's main exports to Kenya include: Machinery and transport equipment, chemicals and related products, beverages, tobacco, etc.

== Resident diplomatic missions ==
- Austria has an embassy in Nairobi.
- Kenya has an embassy in Vienna.

== See also ==
- Foreign relations of Austria
- Foreign relations of Kenya
