= Austria–India relations =

- Austria: India

Diplomatic mission
- Austrian Embassy, New Delhi: Embassy of India, Vienna

Envoy
- Ambassador Katharina Wieser: Ambassador Jaideep Mazumdar

Federal Chancellor of the Republic of Austria, Dr Christian Stocker meeting with PM at Hyderabad House, in New Delhi on April 16, 2026.

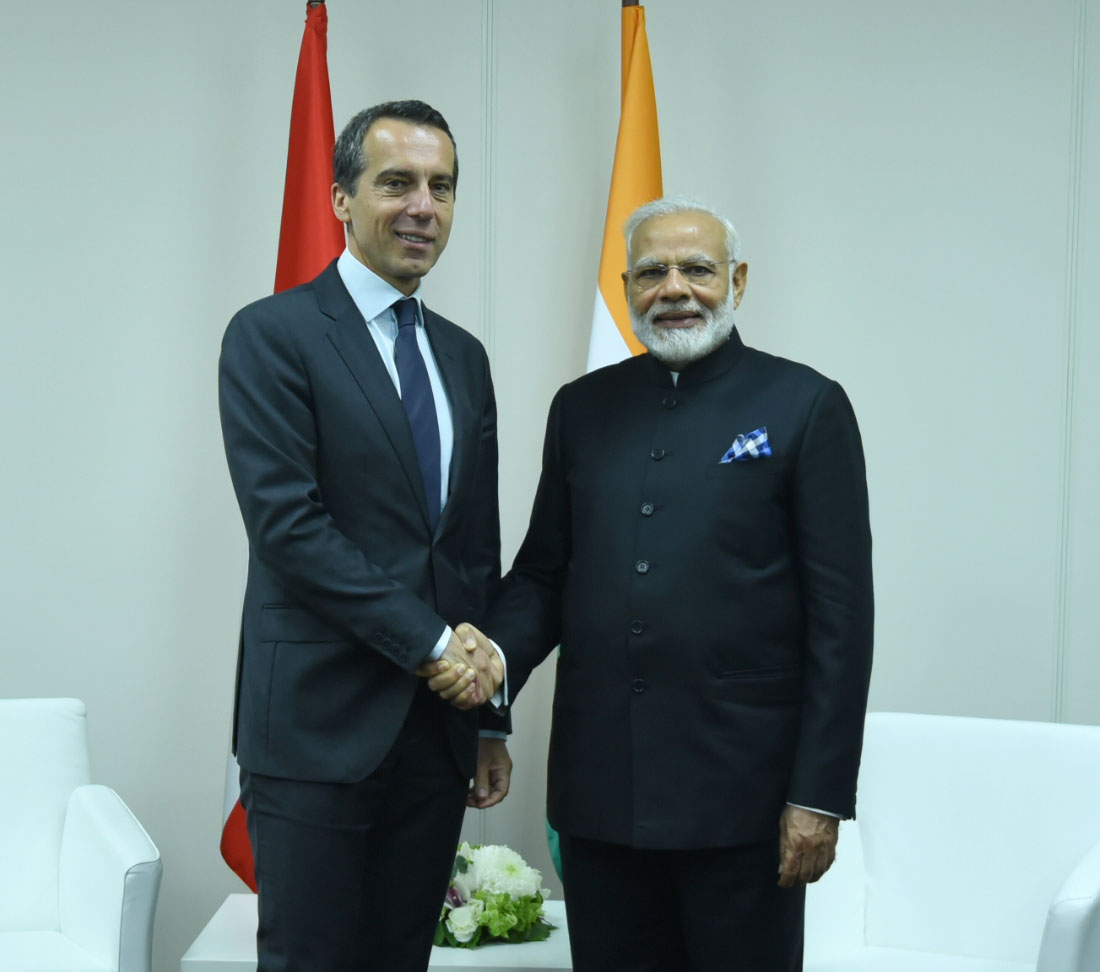
Austrian Chancellor Christian Kern meeting with Indian Prime Minister Narendra Modi on the sidelines of the SPIEF in St. Petersburg, Russia in June 2017.

Austria–India relations or Indo–Austrian relations are the international relations that exist between Austria and India.

India maintains an embassy in Vienna, which is concurrently accredited to Montenegro, The Holy See, and the United Nations Office at Vienna. Austria is represented in India by its embassy and trade commission in New Delhi, an Honorary Consulate General in Mumbai and Honorary Consulates in Kolkata, Chennai and Vasco da Gama, Goa.

== History ==
The Habsburg monarchy, and later the Austrian Empire, made three attempts to colonize and settle the Nicobar Islands. Only the first of these, launched in 1778, was successful. The second attempt was canceled, and the third, in 1886, was abandoned due to prior colonization by the British in 1868.

Diplomatic relations between Austria and India were established in May 1949 by India's first Prime Minister Jawaharlal Nehru and Austria's first post-World War II Chancellor Leopold Figl. Historically, Indo-Austrian ties have been particularly strong and India intervened in June 1953 in Austria's favour during negotiations with the Soviet Union on the Austrian State Treaty. India also supported Austria on the UN-South Tyrol conventions. The main institutional mechanism at the governmental level between India and Austria are the Foreign Office Consultations (FOC) and the Joint Economic Commission (JEC). The Indo-Austrian JEC was established in 1983 and involves meetings between governmental ministries and Chambers of Commerce and Industry of the two countries. The 5th FOC was held in Vienna in February 2011, and the 15th JEC was held in New Delhi in July 2017.

There have been several high level visits by the leaders of the two countries. Prime Ministers Nehru and Indira Gandhi visited Austria in 1955 and 1971 respectively. Chancellor Bruno Kreisky visited India in 1980. Indira Gandhi visited Austria for the second time in 1983. Chancellor Fred Sinowatz visited India in 1984. Indian President K. R. Narayanan visited Austria in 1999 and Austrian President Heinz Fischer visited India in 2005. President Pratibha Patil visited Austria on 4–7 October 2011. During Patil's visit, Austria expressed support for India's bid for a permanent seat on a reformed United Nations Security Council. President Fischer stated, "We recognize that the world is changing fast and that the current composition in the Security Council does not reflect the realities of the new world order currently emerging. Your country [India] deserves to play a bigger role in the Security Council."

Austria's first two satellites, TUGSAT-1 and UniBRITE-1, were launched by the Indian Space Research Organisation (ISRO) onboard PSLV–C20 from Satish Dhawan Space Centre, Sriharikota on 25 February 2013.

Austrian Federal Minister for Europe, Integration & Foreign Affairs Karin Kneissl visited India on her first official visit on 25–26 February 2019. The visit also marked the 70th Anniversary of diplomatic relations between India and Austria.

== Economic relations ==
As of September 2019, there are over 200 collaborations, including 100 technical collaborations and 60 joint ventures between Indian and Austrian firms particularly in the fields of steel, manufacturing technology, railways, transport, and metallurgy. Bilateral trade between Austria and India measured EUR 1.869 billion in 2018, recording a growth of 18.35% over the previous year. India's exports to Austria totaled EUR 945.92 million in 2018 and its imports from Austria stood at EUR 923.54 million. The main commodities exported by India to Austria are Apparels, Textile, Footwear, Rubber articles, Vehicles & Railways parts, Electrical machinery and Mechanical appliances. India's main imports from Austria are Machinery, Mechanical appliances, Railway parts, Iron and Steel.

According to the Austrian National Bank, India has received a cumulative foreign direct investment of EUR 532 million from Austria in 2018, while India had a cumulative direct investment of EUR 128 million in Austria in the same period.

India and Austria signed an Air Services Agreement in 1989, an MoU on Air Services in June 1997, and a Double Taxation Avoidance Agreement and Bilateral Investment Protection Agreement in 1999.

== Cultural relations ==
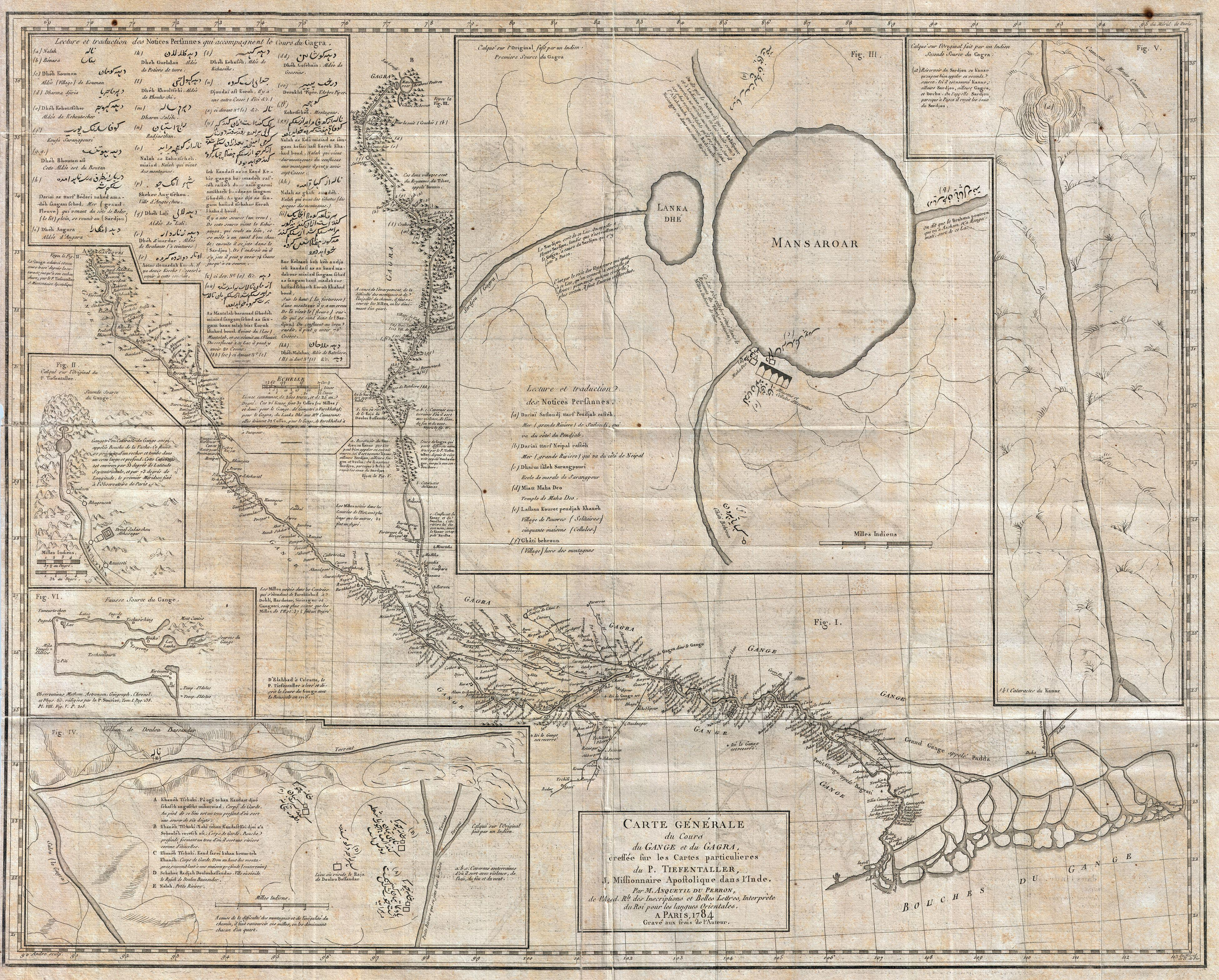
Tiefenthaler's map of the Ganges and Ghaghara rivers, 1784

Austrian Joseph Tiefenthaler was a Jesuit missionary and one of the earliest European geographers to write about India. The Society of Jesus sent Tiefenthaler to India in 1740 where he was established as the rector of the Jesuit school in Agra. Tiefenthaler lived in India until his death on 5 July 1785 in Lucknow. His remains are buried in the mission cemetery in Agra. Thienfaler's travelogues, among others, were considered as exhibits by the Supreme Court of India in its verdict on the Ayodhya dispute in 2019.

Sanskrit began to be taught at the University of Vienna in 1845. A chair for Sanskrit studies was established, and later converted into a chair for Indology. In 1955, it transformed again into a separate Institute for South Asian, Tibetan and Buddhist Studies, whose main focus is Indology. A Memorandum of Understanding (MoU) to establish a short–term Chair of Indian Studies at the university was signed between the Indian Council for Cultural Relations (ICCR) and the University of Vienna in February 2011 and renewed in 2016.

Several Indian artists have performed in Austria. Amjad Ali Khan, Zakir Hussain, Hariprasad Chaurasia, Vishwa Mohan Bhatt, and Anoushka Shankar have performed in Vienna. Conductor Zubin Mehta is associated with the Vienna Philharmonic and has given New Year's performances at the famous Musikverein concert hall, including the 2015 concert. Recently, Bollywood films have begun to be screened at major multiplexes in Vienna. Several Bollywood films have been filmed in Austria given its scenic locales. An MoU on Cultural Exchange was signed by India and Austria in February 2016.

A large number of Indian tourists visit Austria annually. In 2013, about 25,000 Indians visited Vienna.

== Indians in Austria ==
There were around 31,000 Indians living in Austria as of September 2019. The majority are from the states of Kerala and Punjab and primarily work in the healthcare sector or are self-employed.

== Migration and Mobility Agreement ==
Signed in May of 2023 at the EU Indo-Pacific Ministerial Forum in Stockholm by Austrian Foreign Minister Alexander Schallenberg and his Indian counterpart, Subrahmanyam Jaishankar, the partnership will serve to make legal work migration easier, improve exchanges between students in India and Austria including rapid visa processing especially for journalists and researchers, and create an Austrian-Indian Working Holiday Programme.

== Resident diplomatic missions ==
- Austria has an embassy in New Delhi.
- India has an embassy in Vienna.

== See also ==
- Foreign relations of Austria
- Foreign relations of India
- Hinduism in Austria
