= Austria–Ukraine relations =

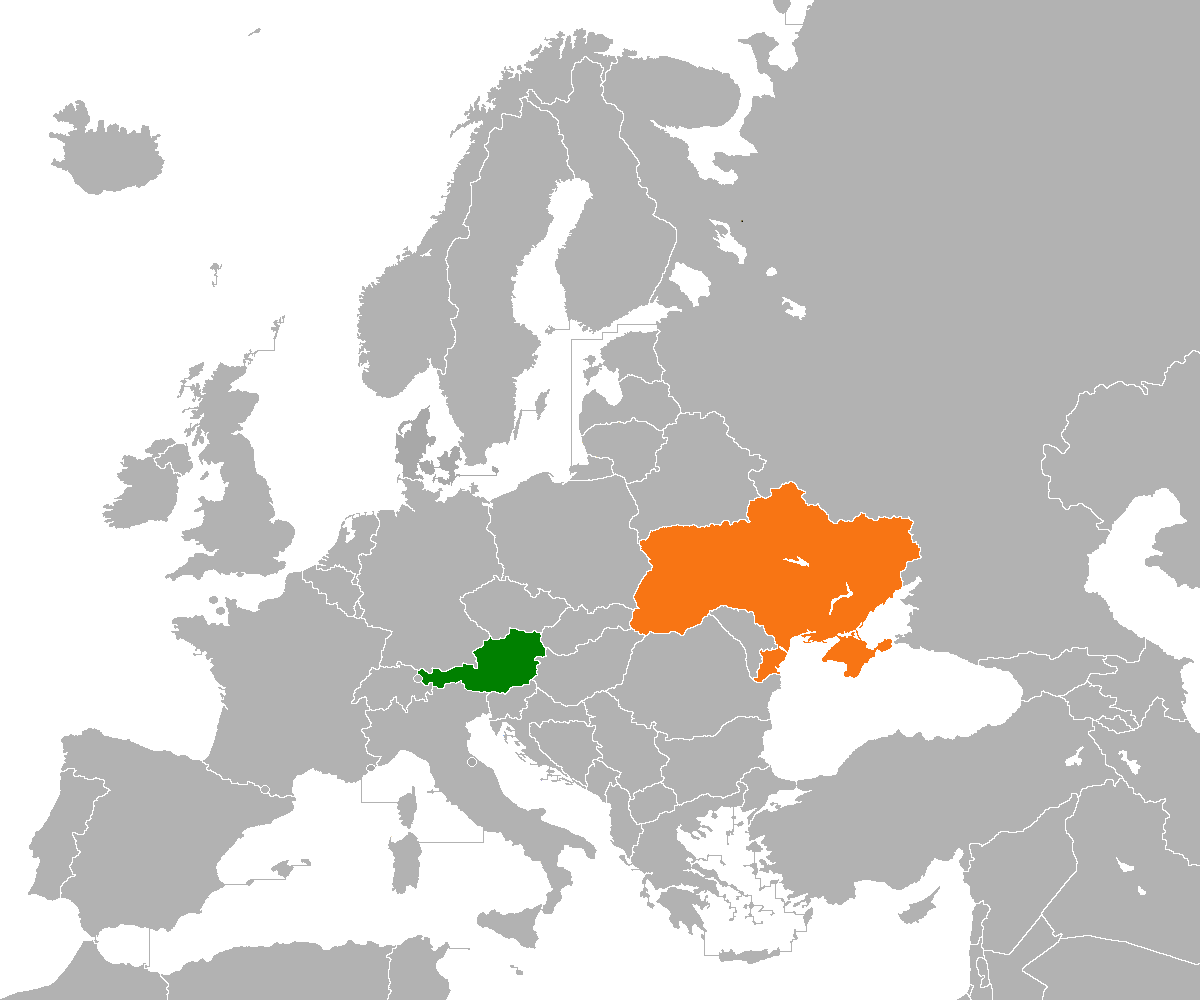
- Austria: Ukraine

Diplomatic mission
- Embassy of Austria, Kyiv: Embassy of Ukraine, Vienna

Foreign relations exist between Austria and Ukraine. Both countries established diplomatic relations in 1992. The Treaty of Brest-Litovsk in 1918 became the first major international document with the Austrian nation.

Historically, a big portion of West Ukraine (Galicia, as part of the Kingdom of Galicia and Lodomeria, Carpathia, as part of the Kingdom of Hungary, and Northern Bukovina, as part of the Duchy of Bukovina) were part of the Austro-Hungarian Empire, today consisting of: Lviv Oblast, Ivano-Frankivsk Oblast, Ternopil Oblast, Chernivtsi Oblast and Zakarpattia Oblast. During World War I Ukraine was occupied by the Central powers military force (including the Austrian military) that drove Bolsheviks out of the country.

Austria has an embassy in Kyiv and 3 honorary consulates (in Donetsk, Kharkiv and Lviv). Ukraine has an embassy in Vienna and 2 honorary consulates (in Klagenfurt and Salzburg).

In October 1998, the President of Ukraine Leonid Kuchma paid a state visit to Austria. In May 2000, the President of Austria Thomas Klestil paid a state visit to Ukraine. Austria joined the European Union in 1995, while Ukraine is a candidate for EU accession. Both countries are full members of the Council of Europe and the European Political Community.

== History ==
=== Habsburg era ===
Ethnic groups in Austria-Hungary

With the third partition of Poland in 1795, Galicia, Carpathia and Northern Bukovina became part of Austria, where they constituted independent crown lands and belonged to the Austrian Empire until the First World War. During this era, there was a fruitful exchange of ideas and talents, which created a common cultural space that is still visible today, for example in the architecture of western Ukrainian cities (e.g., Lviv). Under the rule of the Danube Monarchy, Ukrainians were able to preserve their cultural identity and gain political influence (e.g., through representation in the Imperial Council).^{[3]} Austria-Hungary recognized the short-lived Ukrainian People's Republic with the Treaty of Brest-Litovsk in 1917. With the dissolution of the Habsburg Monarchy after the end of the First World War, Austrian rule in western Ukraine came to an end.

=== 20th century and Ukrainian independence ===
After 1918, the areas of Eastern Galicia and Bukovina, which were predominantly inhabited by Ukrainians, were assigned to other states (Poland, Romania and Czechoslovakia), and Ukraine was part of the Soviet Union as the Ukrainian SSR from 1922 to 1991. Direct bilateral relations between Vienna and Kyiv therefore only developed after the end of the Cold War. Austria quickly recognized the independence of Ukraine in 1991 and established diplomatic relations on January 24, 1992. In the same month, the Austrian Embassy in Kyiv was opened, marking the beginning of intensive cooperation at all levels. In the 1990s, numerous bilateral agreements were concluded in almost all areas of expertise; a wide range of partnerships also developed between cities, regions, and scientific and cultural institutions. This intensification is reflected, for example, in the volume of trade, which rose from approximately 1.8 billion schillings in 1992 to almost 7 billion schillings (around 500 million euros) in 2001. Austria recognized Ukraine early on as a key country in Europe and supported its pro-European course. Austrian representatives emphasized that Ukraine belonged to the European community both historically and politically.

=== After 2014 ===
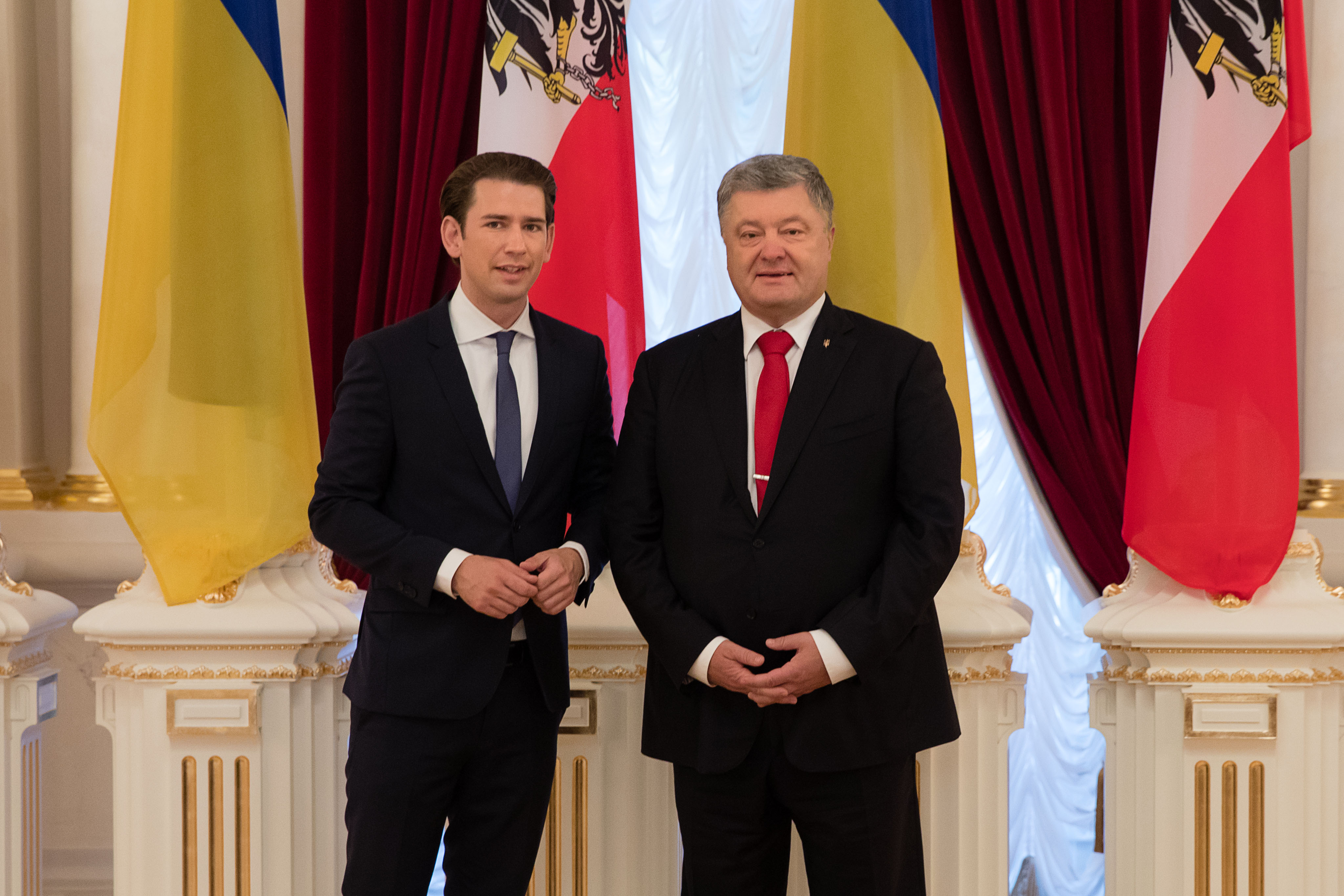
Austrian Chancellor Sebastian Kurz with Ukrainian President Petro Poroshenko in Kyiv, 4 September 2018

The Ukrainian government's refusal to sign an already initialed EU Association Agreement in November 2013 sparked mass protests (the Euromaidan), which led to a change of government in Kyiv in February 2014. Immediately afterwards, Russia annexed Crimea in violation of international law and fueled an armed conflict in eastern Ukraine (Donbass). Austria clearly condemned the violation of Ukraine's sovereignty and integrity. Since 2014, Vienna has been increasingly involved in Ukraine: the Austrian government has financed humanitarian projects in the conflict areas of eastern Ukraine and supported reform efforts in the Ukrainian justice and security sector – partly bilaterally, partly within the framework of EU programs. Austria sought diplomatic solutions internationally; during its OSCE chairmanship in 2017, it made the settlement of the Ukraine conflict a priority, and Foreign Minister Sebastian Kurz traveled to Ukraine twice. Significant milestones in EU-Ukraine relations were the entry into force of the EU Association Agreement on September 1, 2017, and the lifting of visa requirements for Ukrainian citizens in the Schengen area in the same year, steps that were also welcomed and supported by Austria.

==== Russian invasion of Ukraine in 2022 ====
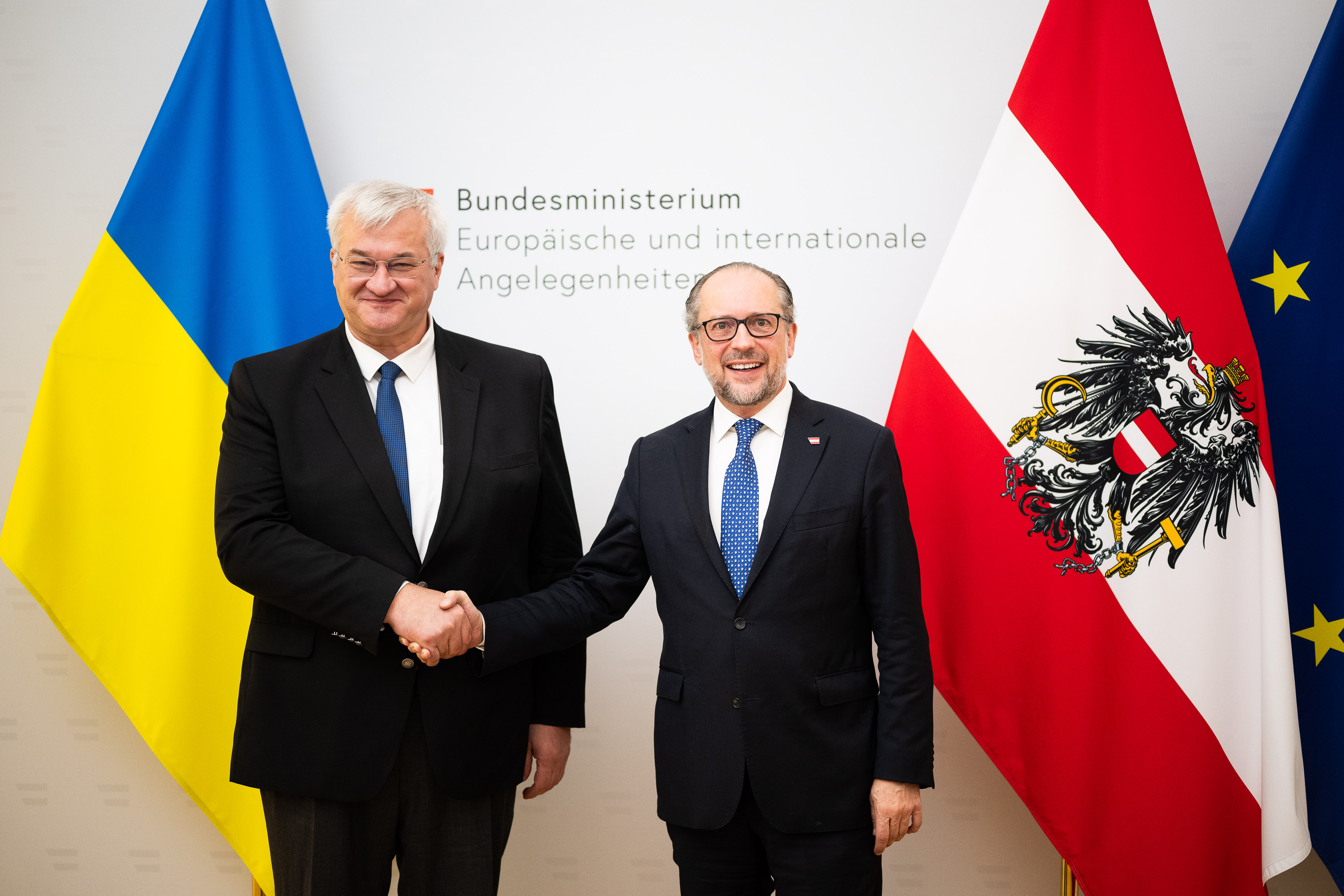
Meeting between Foreign Ministers Andrij Sybiha and Alexander Schallenberg (2024)

After Russia's invasion of Ukraine in February 2022, Austria sided with Ukraine. The federal government condemned Russia's unprovoked aggression as a violation of international law and participated in all EU sanctions against Russia. In June 2022, Austria spoke out in favor of granting Ukraine EU candidate status, and in December 2023, the start of EU accession negotiations was decided, which was welcomed in Vienna, which supports the implementation of the necessary reform measures. Despite its perpetual neutrality, Austria is contributing to Ukraine's defense support: through the European Peace Facility, Vienna is financing the purchase of non-lethal military equipment (around €153 million by 2023), while abstaining from decisions on arms deliveries and not sending its own soldiers or trainers. The focus of support is on humanitarian aid. Austria has provided a total of over €200 million in humanitarian and financial aid to Ukraine until 2023 and has taken in around 70,000 war refugees from Ukraine.

The government in Vienna is also actively supporting Ukraine's peace efforts: it endorses Ukrainian President Volodymyr Zelenskyy's peace formula (the 10-point plan) and is particularly involved in the areas of nuclear safety, food security (including through the Grain from Ukraine initiative) and humanitarian mine clearance. There have also been mutual solidarity visits at the highest level: Federal President Alexander Van der Bellen traveled to Kyiv and western Ukraine at the end of January 2023 to assure Ukraine of Austria's continued solidarity. At the same time, Austria participates in international coordination formats such as the Crimea Platform in order to work with partners to strengthen Ukrainian sovereignty and seek diplomatic solutions to the conflict.

== Economic relations ==
Ukraine is an important trading partner for Austria, particularly as a supplier of raw materials. In 2021, Austria sourced almost one-twelfth of all imported raw materials from Ukraine, and over 40% of its iron ore imports came from there. In return, Austria mainly exports high-quality industrial goods, with pharmaceutical and medical products, machinery, and technical equipment being particularly important. Austria is also one of the largest foreign investors in Ukraine: in mid-2021, it was the sixth-largest investor in the country with a cumulative total of $1.77 billion in direct investment. Around 1,000 Austrian companies are active in Ukraine, of which around 200 have their own branches (including approx. 25 production sites). Despite the difficult conditions since the start of the war in 2022, all of these companies have maintained their presence in the country; many are supporting not only their employees but also the population with aid deliveries and other services. An Austrian Trade and Economic Promotion Office in Kyiv represents the Austrian economy in the country.

== Cultural relations ==
The historical ties are clearly evident in cultural relations. In western Ukrainian cities such as Lviv (Lemberg) and Chernivtsi (Czernowitz), architectural and cultural influences from the Austro-Hungarian era are still visible today. Building on this heritage, Austria maintains a broad cultural engagement in Ukraine. The first Austrian libraries were opened in Lviv and Chernivtsi back in 1992; today there are five such libraries nationwide, funded by the Austrian Foreign Ministry. There is also an Austrian Cultural Forum in Kyiv (temporarily closed since 2022) and several cooperation offices of the Austrian Exchange Service (OeAD) – for example in Lviv and Odesa – which implement cultural and educational projects. A joint Ukraine Office Austria serves as a contact point for cultural professionals, scientists, and students from both countries and coordinates cooperation projects in areas such as art, media, human rights, digitization, and healthcare. Scientific cooperation is also a high priority: Austria has maintained a scientific cooperation office in Lviv with a specialist attaché since 2001, and numerous university partnerships (including between the Universities of Vienna and Lviv) promote academic exchange.

== Carpathian Eight ==
On 18 September 2026, Ukrainian President Volodymyr Zelenskyy announced the creation of the Carpathian Eight, a regional cooperation format involving Austria, the Czech Republic, Hungary, Poland, Romania, Serbia, Slovakia and Ukraine. The initiative was presented as a framework for cooperation in trade, transport, energy and security.

== Resident diplomatic missions ==
- Austria has an embassy in Kyiv.
- Ukraine has an embassy in Vienna.
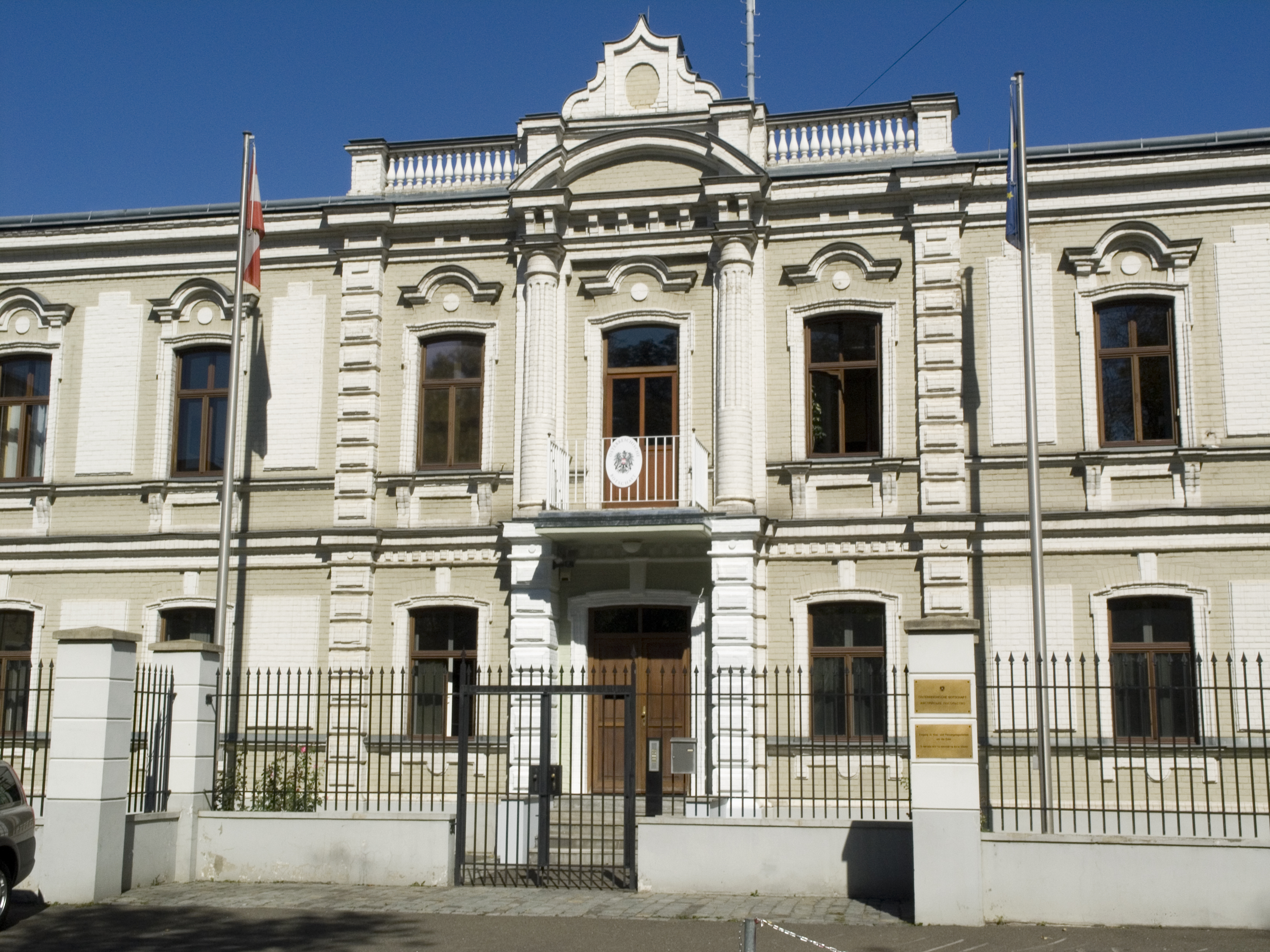
Embassy of Austria in Kyiv

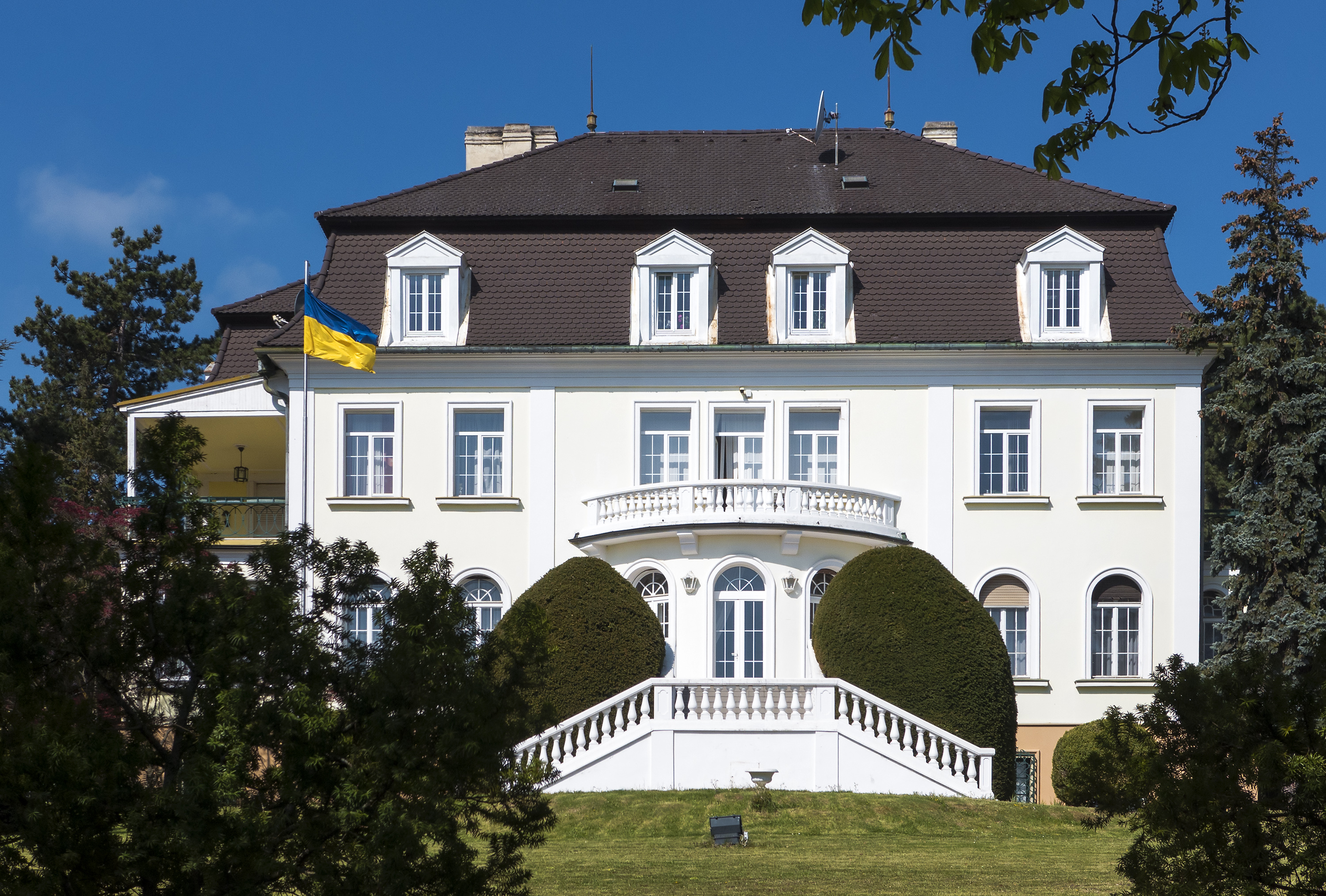
Embassy of Ukraine in Vienna

== See also ==
- Foreign relations of Austria
- Foreign relations of Ukraine
- Ukrainians in Austria
- Ukraine–European Union relations
