= Austria–Chile relations =

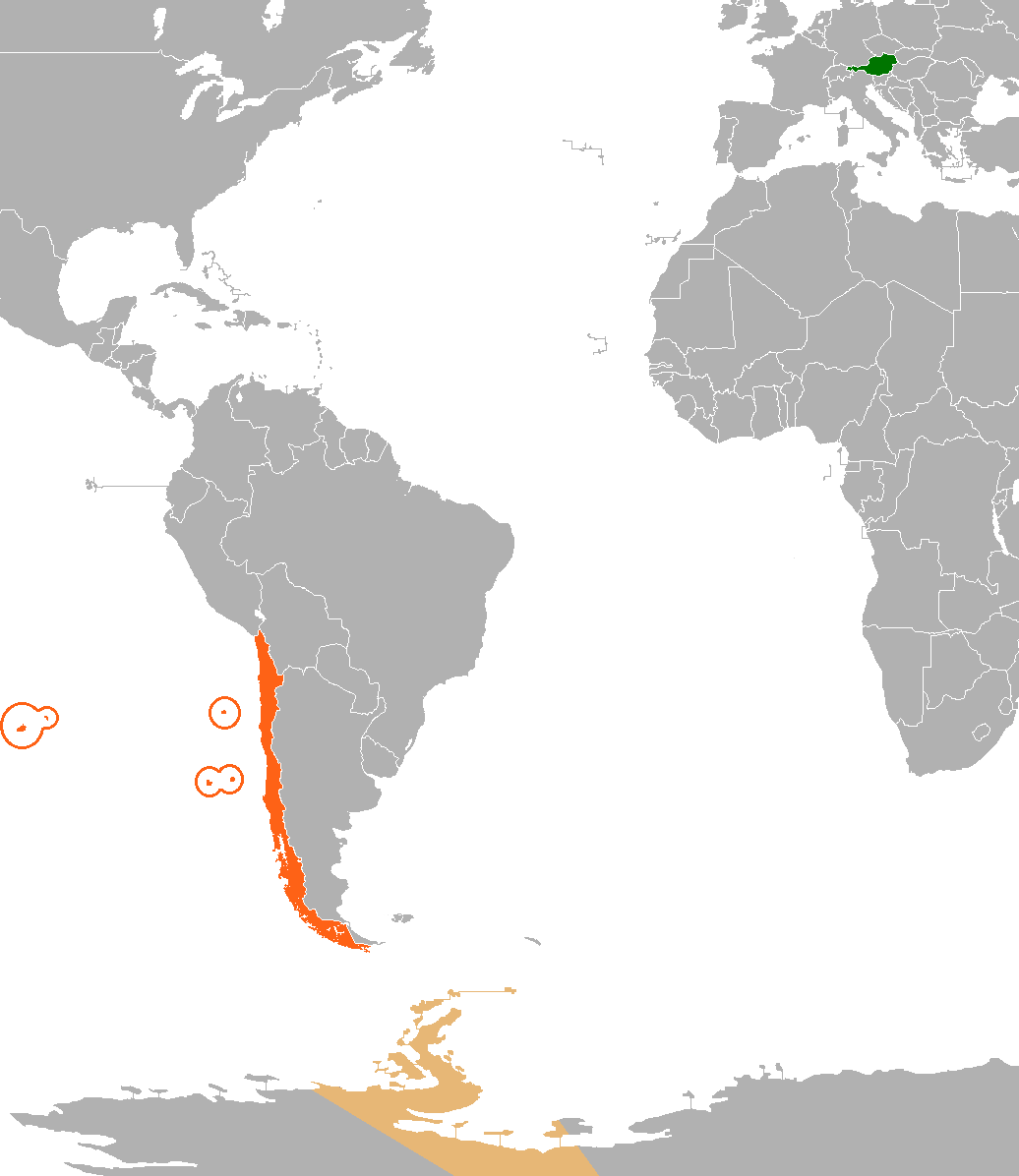
- Austria: Chile

Austria–Chile relations are the bilateral relations between Austria and Chile. Both nations are members of the Organisation for Economic Co-operation and Development and the United Nations.

== History ==
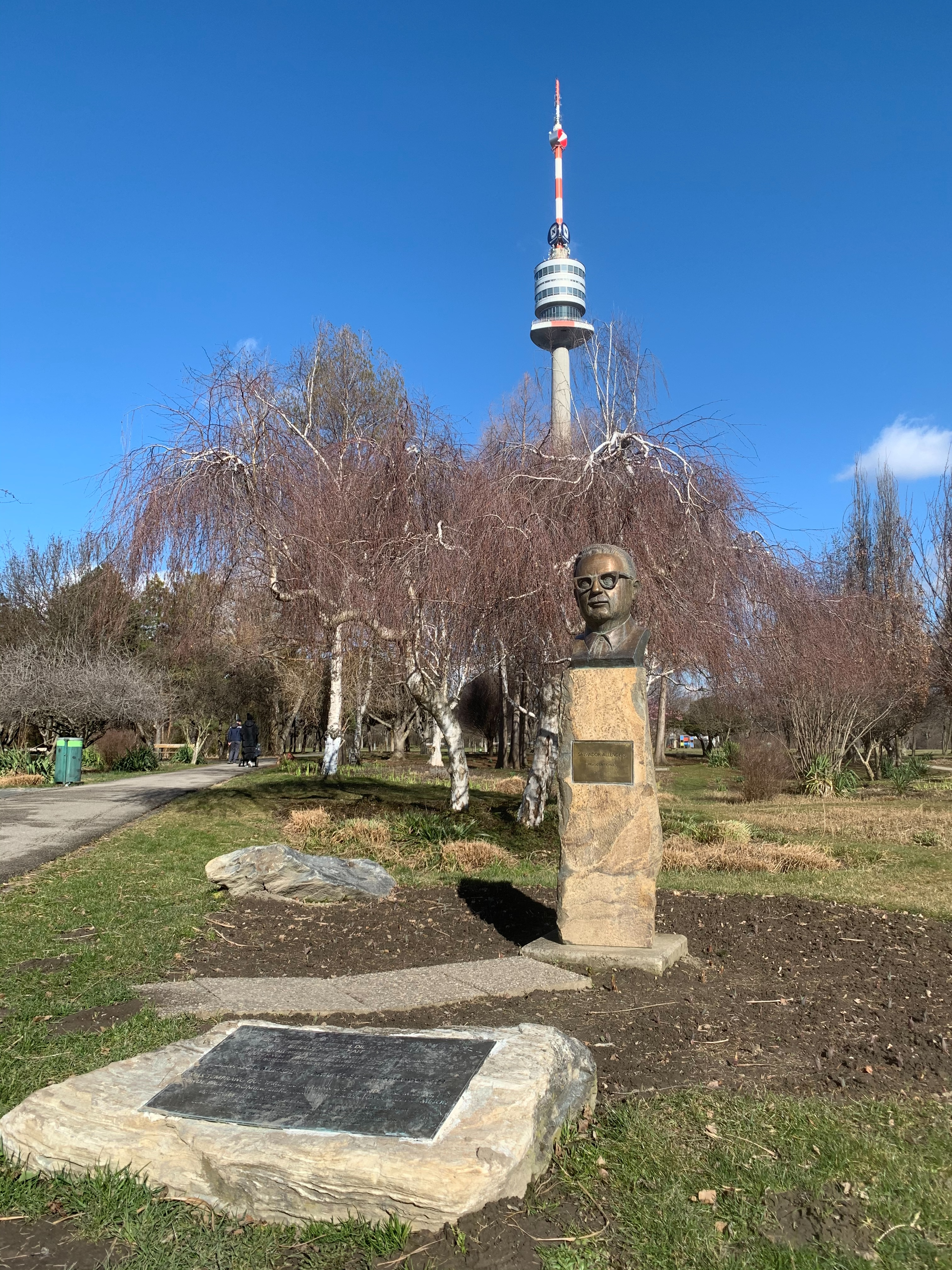
Monument to Salvador Allende in Vienna

The first contact between Austria and Chile dates back to the first half of the 19th century. In 1846, both nations exchanged letters of recognition which made Chile the first Latin American nation to be recognized by the Habsburg monarchy.

In 1856 the first wave of Austrians immigrated to Chile. Many of the Austrians were from the Zillertal valley in Austria and they primarily settled around Lake Llanquihue in southern Chile. The Chilean town of Nueva Braunau was founded by Austrian immigrants. In the period between the two World Wars it is estimated that between 4,000 and 5,000 Austrians settled in Chile during the 20th century.

In 1870 a Treaty of Friendship, Commerce and Navigation between the Austro-Hungarian Empire and Chile was signed. A diplomatic legation of the Austro-Hungarian Empire was opened in 1903 in Santiago. That same year, Chile opened a diplomatic legation in Vienna. In 1918 after World War I, the Austro-Hungarian Empire dissolved and Austria became an independent nation. In 1938, Chile became a destination for Austrian Jews fearing changes affecting the Austrian Jewish community after the Anschluss by Nazi Germany.

After World War II, Austria and Chile agreed to exchange Plenipotentiary Ministers: the first Austrian diplomatic representative arrived in Santiago in 1948. Four years later the diplomatic representations rose to the rank of embassies.

In September 1973, Chile experienced a coup d'état. As a result, approximately 1,500 Chileans fled to Austria. During the presidency of Augusto Pinochet, both nations maintained diplomatic relations. In 2002, Chile signed a free trade agreement with the European Union (which includes Austria).

In May 2006, Chilean President Michelle Bachelet became the first Chilean head-of-state to pay a visit to Austria. While in Austria, President Bachelet met with members of the Chilean-Austrian community in Vienna. In May 2008, Austrian Chancellor Alfred Gusenbauer paid an official visit to Chile, becoming the first Austrian head-of-government to visit Chile. In December 2015, President Bachelet paid a second visit to Austria.

In October 2018, delegations from both nations held a third Meeting of Political Consultations in Santiago. During the meeting, the delegates exchanged points of view on the bilateral, regional and global relationship, such as the modernization of the Chile-European Union Association Agreement and the Austrian Presidency of the European Union, which that nation held during the second half of 2018.

== Bilateral agreements ==
Both nations have signed several bilateral agreements such as a Treaty of Friendship, Commerce and Navigation (1870); Agreement on the lifting of visa requirements for ordinary passport holders (1954); Agreement in Tourism Cooperation (1954); Agreement in the granting of authorizations to radio amateurs from both countries to operate amateur radio stations (1986); Agreement of cooperation in combating illegal drug trafficking, psychotropic substances and organized crime (1996); Agreement on Social Security (1997); Agreement on the promotion and mutual protection of investments (1997); Agreement on the avoidance of double taxation and the prevention of tax evasion in the area of taxes on income and wealth (2012); Agreement for a Working Holiday Program (2017); and an Air Transport Agreement (2022).

== Resident diplomatic missions ==
- Austria has an embassy in Santiago.
- Chile has an embassy in Vienna.
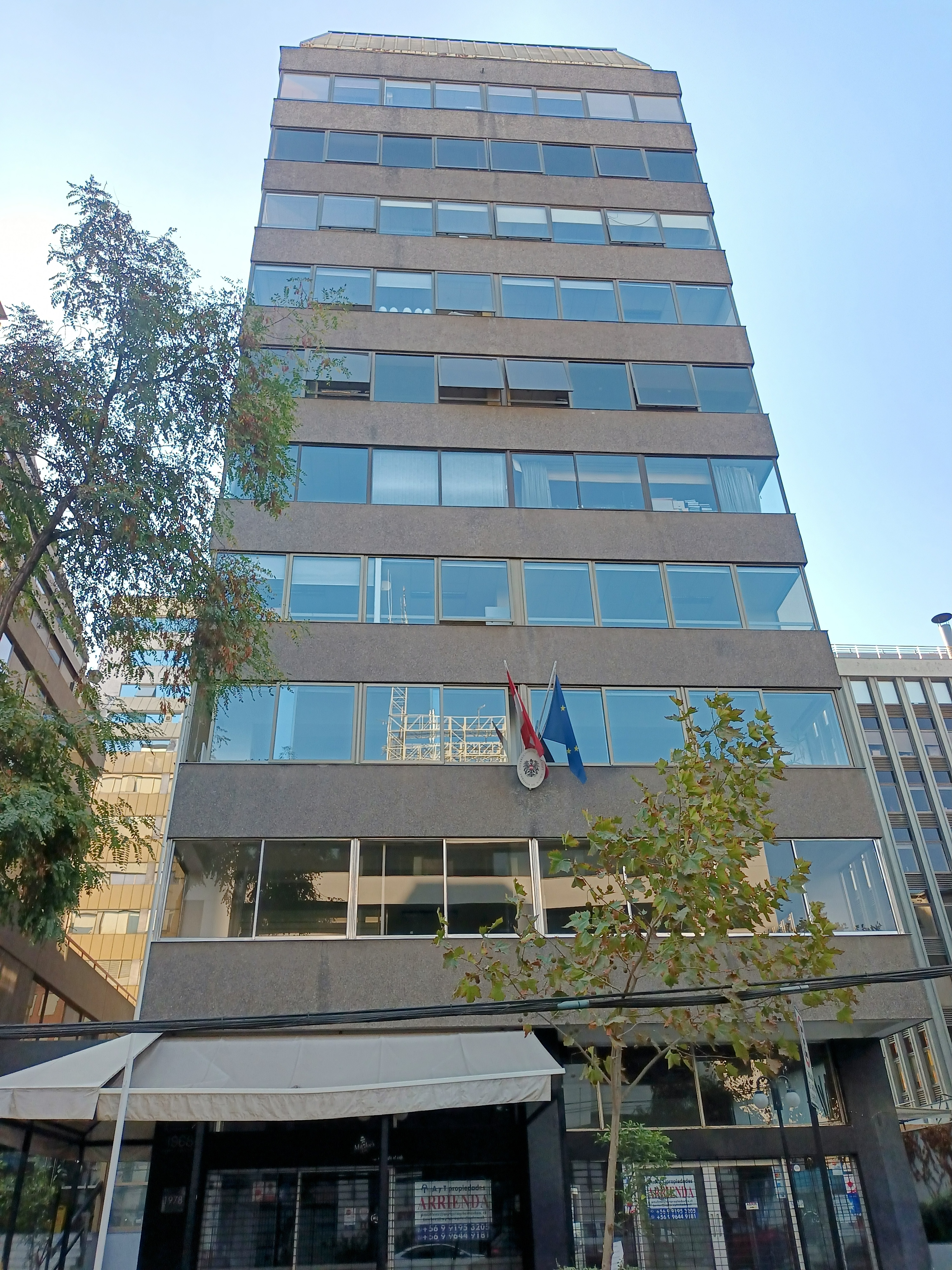
Embassy of Austria in Santiago

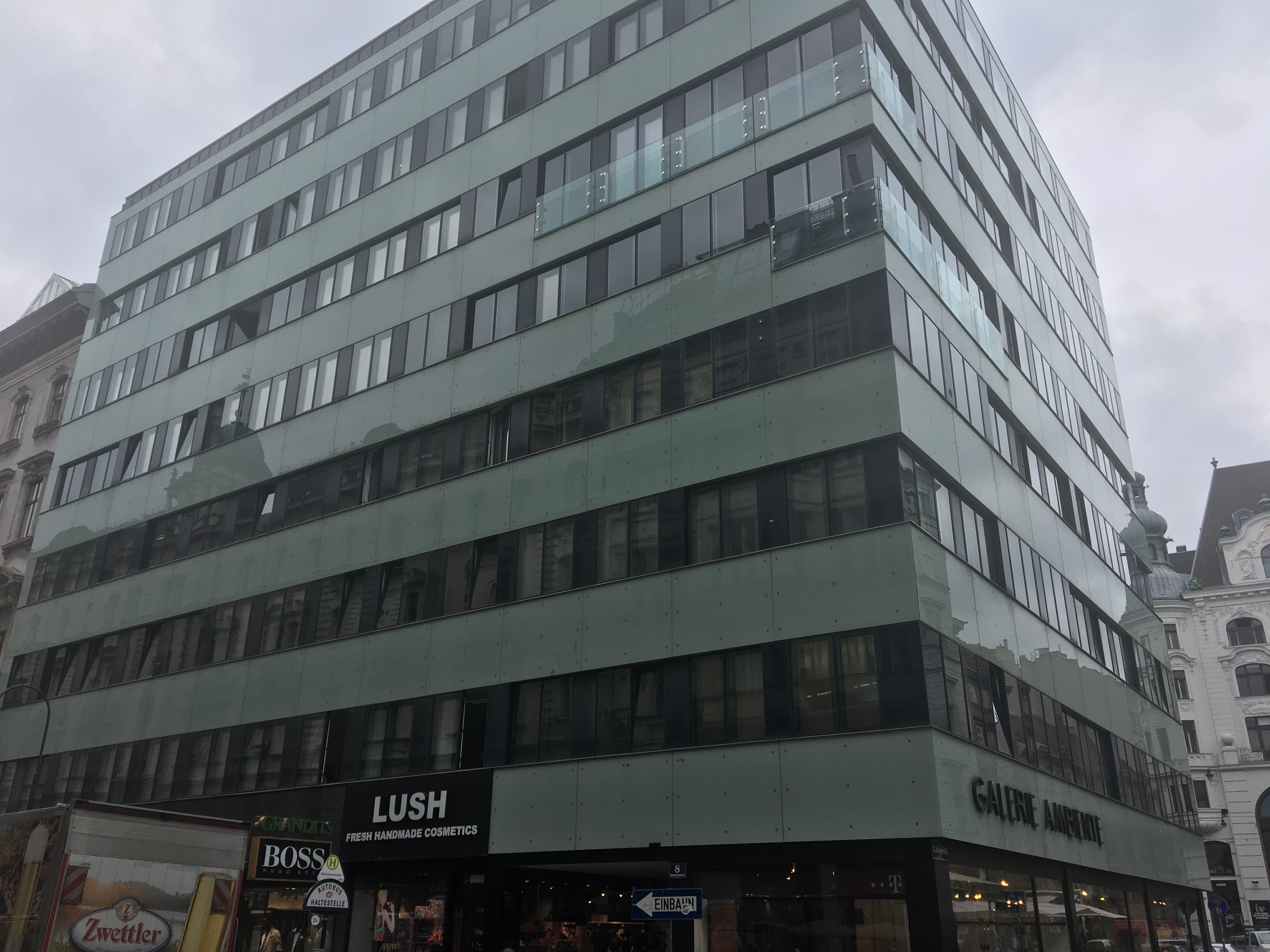
Building hosting the Embassy of Chile in Vienna

== See also ==
- Foreign relations of Austria
- Foreign relations of Chile
- Immigration to Austria
- Immigration to Chile
