= Austria–Finland relations =

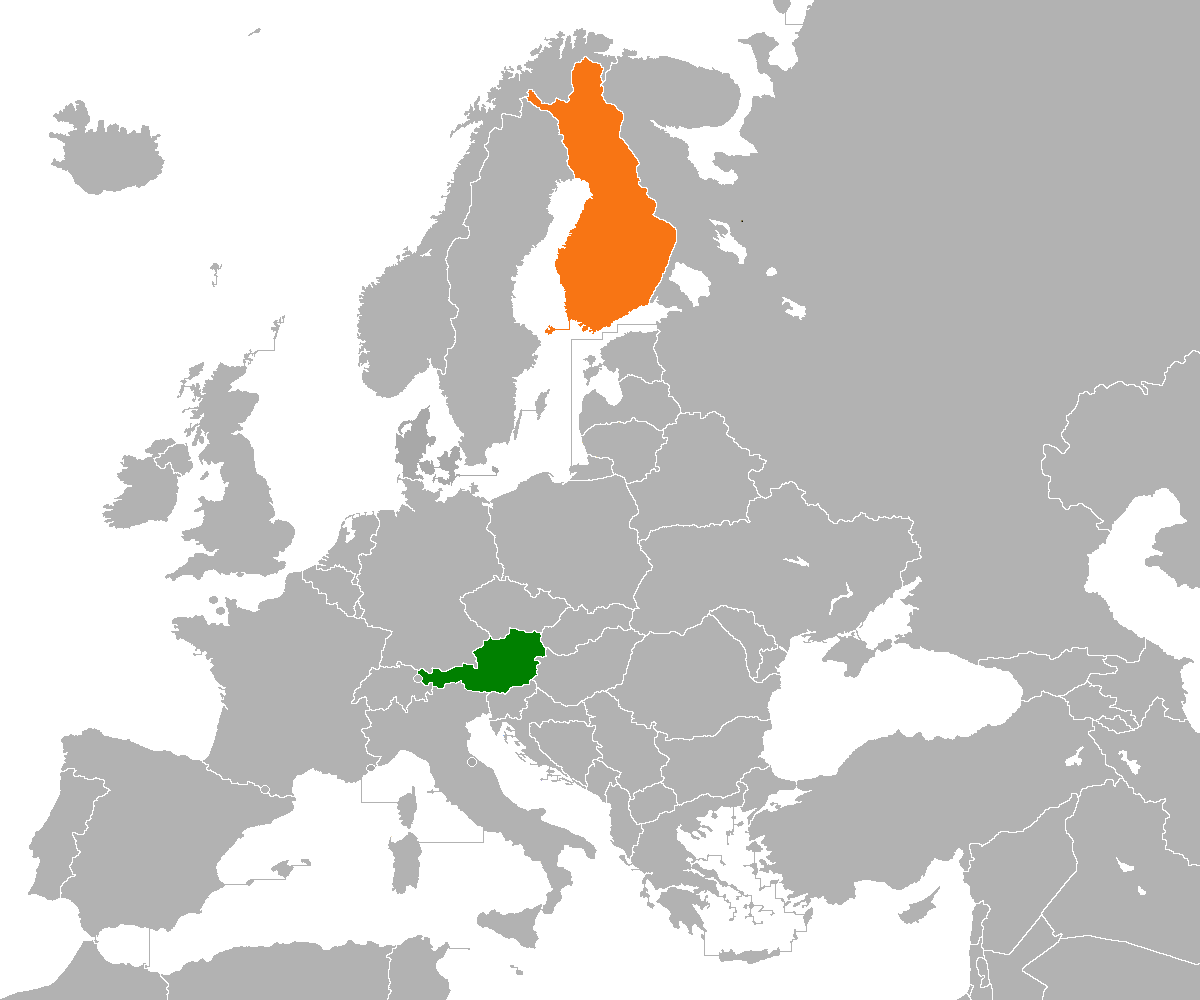
- Austria: Finland

Foreign relations exist between Austria and Finland. Austria recognised Finland on 13 January 1918. Both countries established diplomatic relations on 19 July 1918. Austria has an embassy in Helsinki Finland has an embassy in Vienna. Both countries are full members of the European Union and of the Council of Europe. The two countries became members of the European Union in 1995.

Herbert Pichler is the current ambassador of Austria to Finland. Nina Vaskunlahti is the current ambassador of Finland to Austria since September 2023.

== History ==
Austria-Hungary was among the first states to recognise Finland's independence, which Finland had declared from the Russian Empire on 6 December 1917. Recognition followed on 13 January 1918, and the two countries established diplomatic relations on 19 July 1918.

The collapse of Austria-Hungary in November 1918 and the proclamation of the Republic of Austria meant that relations between the two new states had to be re-established. Their development was hampered by the upheavals of the interwar period, the Second World War and the Allied occupation of Austria until 1955; diplomatic relations were re-established on 29 March 1949 and were fully resumed only after Austria regained its sovereignty in 1955. Austria reopened a diplomatic mission in Helsinki in 1956, which was raised to embassy status in 1961.

Austria and Finland acceded jointly to the European Union on 1 January 1995.

== Resident diplomatic missions ==
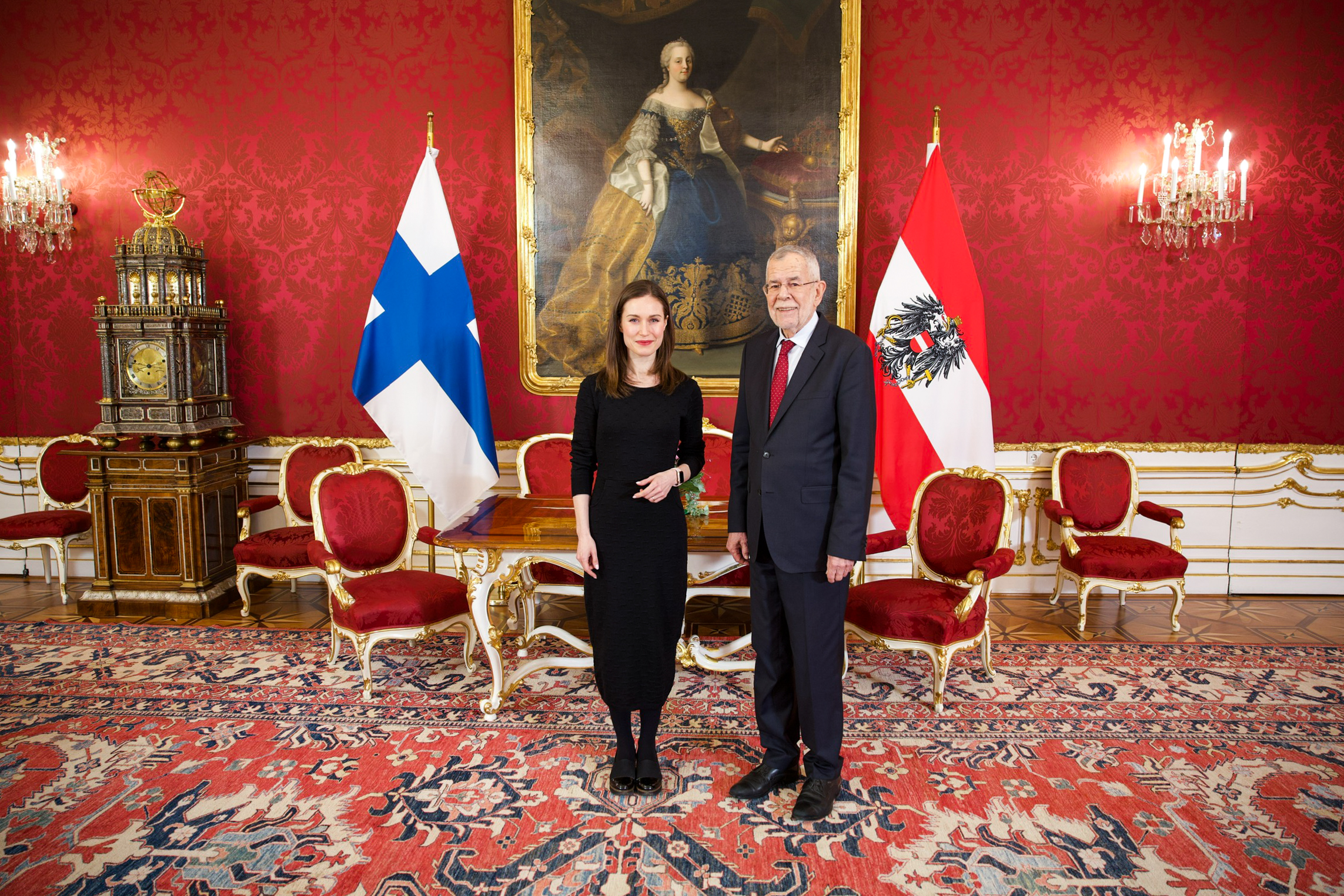
Finnish Prime Minister Sanna Marin and Austrian President Alexander Van der Bellen in 2023

- Austria has an embassy in Helsinki.
- Finland has an embassy in Vienna.
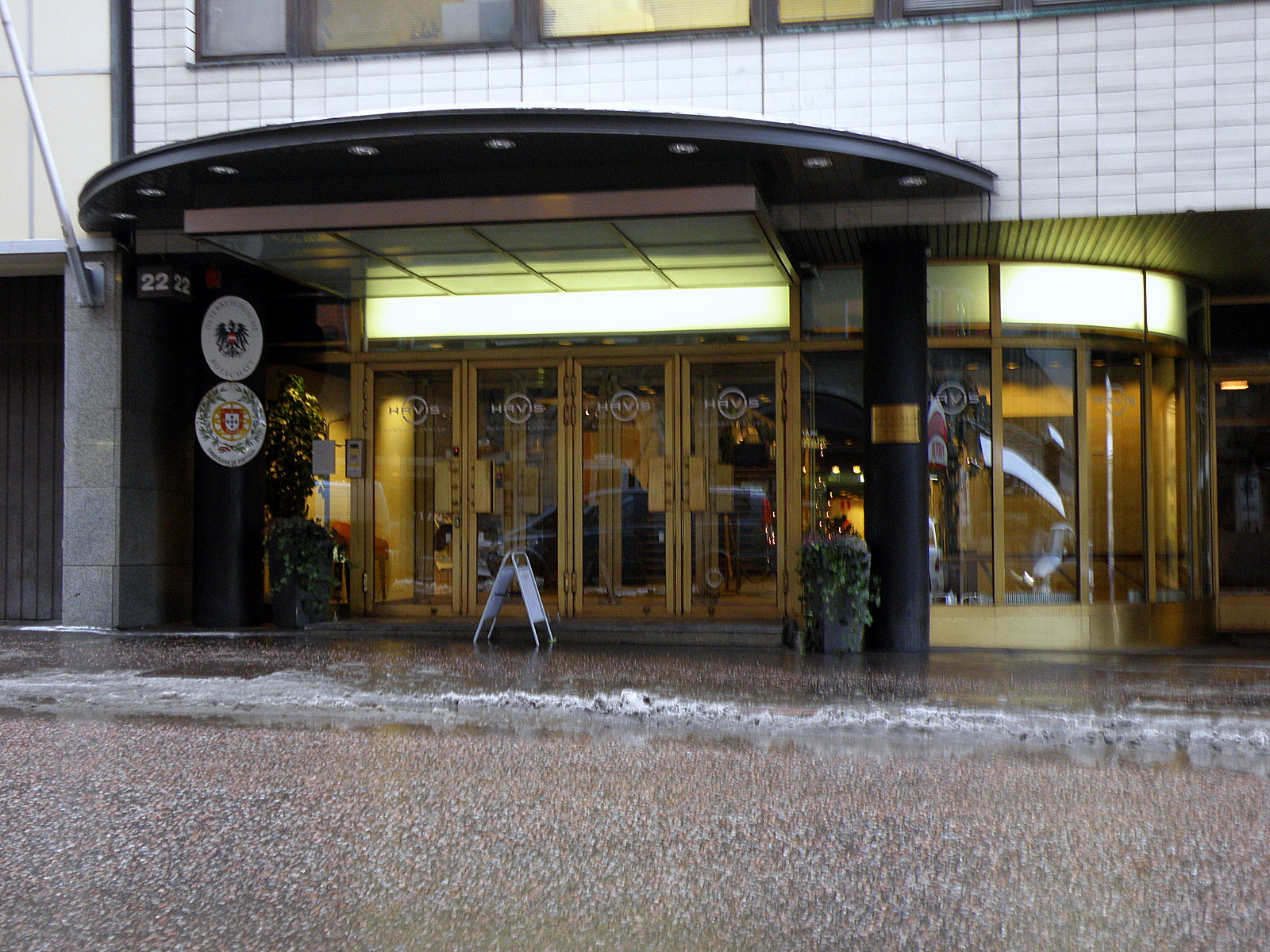
Embassy of Austria in Helsinki

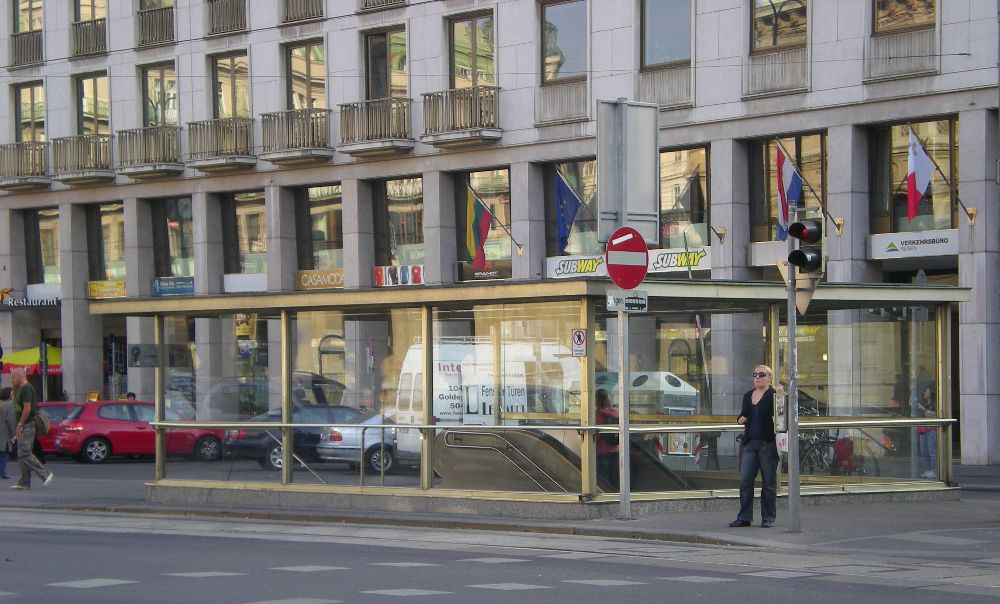
Embassy of Finland in Vienna

== See also ==
- Foreign relations of Austria
- Foreign relations of Finland
- Neutral and Non-Aligned European States
