= Austria–Denmark relations =

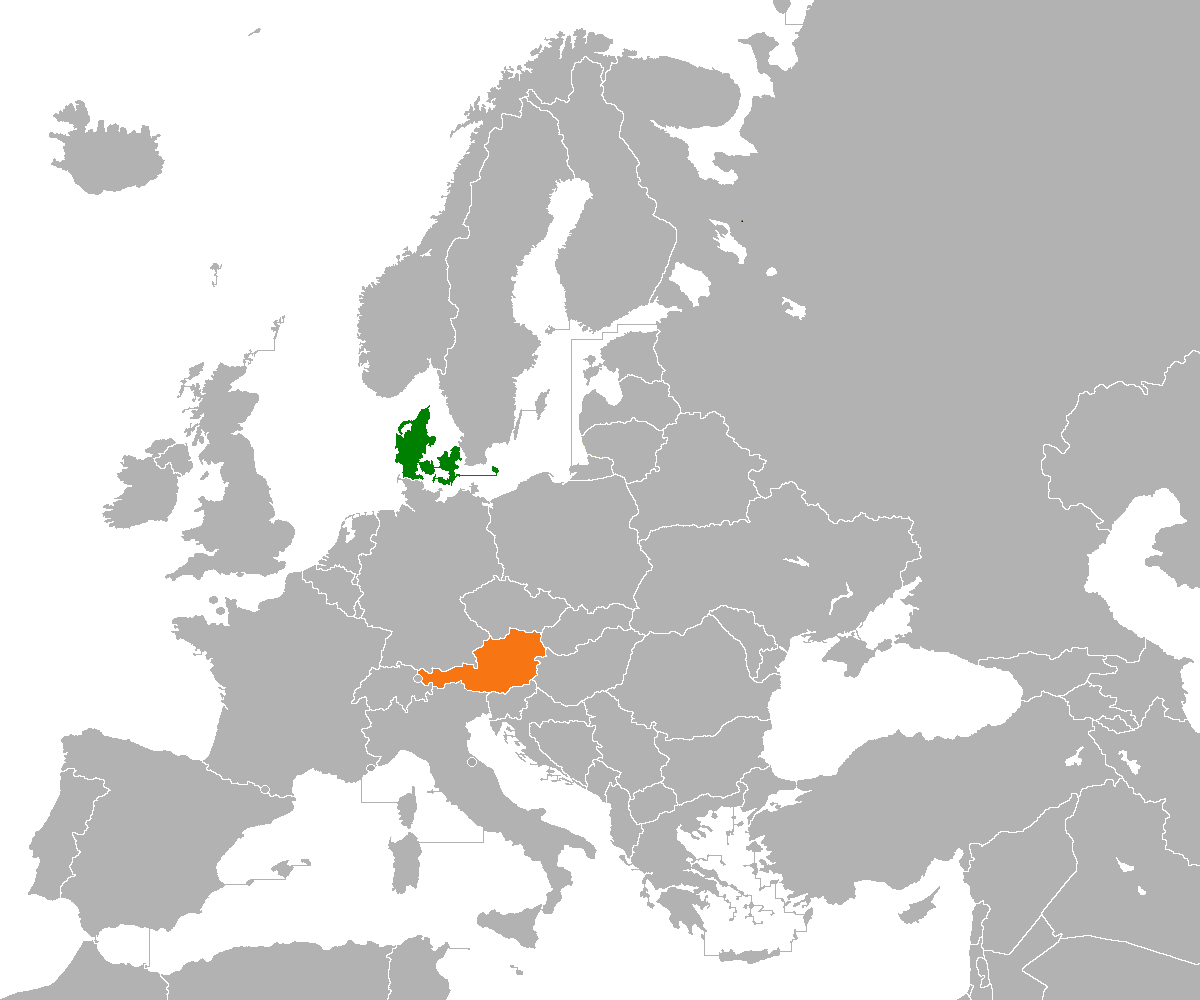
- Denmark: Austria

Foreign relations exist between Austria and Denmark. Austria has an embassy in Copenhagen and Denmark has an embassy in Vienna. Both countries are full members of the Council of Europe, of the Organisation for Economic Co-operation and Development, and of the European Union. Diplomatic relations were established on 19 December 1925.

== History ==
Austria and Denmark were allies against Sweden in 1643–45 and 1657–60. Austria established a legation in Copenhagen in 1691. The Austrian Archduke has the Order of the Elephant, the highest Danish order of chivalry.

=== Second Schleswig War ===
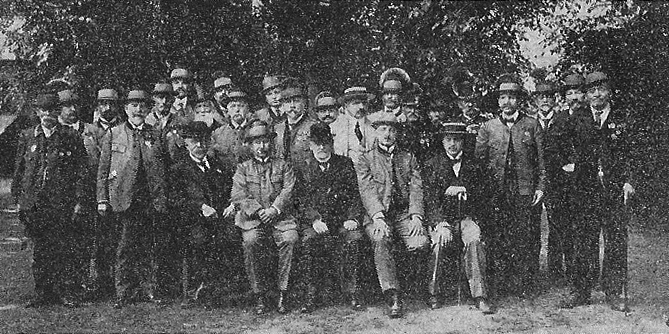
Austrian veterans from the Second Schleswig War of 1864

The Second Schleswig War was the second military conflict as a result of the Schleswig-Holstein Question. It began on 1 February 1864, when Prussian forces crossed the border into Schleswig.

Denmark fought Prussia and Austria. Like the First Schleswig War (1848–51), it was fought for control of the duchies because of succession disputes concerning the duchies of Holstein and Lauenburg when the Danish king died without an heir acceptable to the German Confederation. Decisive controversy arose due to the passing of the November Constitution, which integrated the Duchy of Schleswig into the Danish kingdom in violation of the London Protocol.

Reasons for the war were the ethnic controversy in Schleswig and the co-existence of conflicting political systems within the Danish unitary state.

The war ended on 30 October 1864, when the Treaty of Vienna caused Denmark's cession of the Duchies of Schleswig, Holstein, and Saxe-Lauenburg to Prussia and Austria. It was the last victorious conflict of the Austrian Empire/Austria-Hungary in its history.

=== 20th century ===
In 1927, an agreement on free visas was signed in Berlin.

After the First World War, 25,000 children from Vienna fled to Denmark, and 12,000 did so after the Second World War.

During World War II, some Danes were imprisoned in a subcamp of the Mauthausen concentration camp in Melk in German-annexed Austria.

== Trade ==
Austria has a trade delegation in Copenhagen.

The Danish pastry was created (accidentally) in Denmark by bakers from Vienna, who were brought in to fill a labor shortage created by striking Copenhagen bakers.

The trade between Austria and Denmark increased from January to August 2010. Austrian exports to Denmark increased by almost 4%, mainly due to export growth in industrial sectors. Exports of pharmaceutical products increased by 8% and 20%.

== Melchior Lorck ==
Melchior Lorck was a renaissance painter, draughtsman, and printmaker of Danish-German origin. He produced the most thorough visual record of the life and customs of Turkey in the 16th century, to this day a unique source. He was also the first Danish artist of whom a substantial biography is reconstructable and a substantial body of artworks is attributable. Lorck returned to Western Europe in the autumn of 1559. In 1560, he was documented in Vienna, where he stayed until 1566.

== Expatriates ==
806 Danes lived in Austria in 2001, and 1,307 Austrians lived in Denmark in 2005.

== Tourism ==
301,449 Danes visited Austria in 2007.

== Resident diplomatic missions ==
- Austria has an embassy in Copenhagen.
- Denmark has an embassy in Vienna.

== See also ==
- Foreign relations of Austria
- Foreign relations of Denmark
