= Austria–Spain relations =

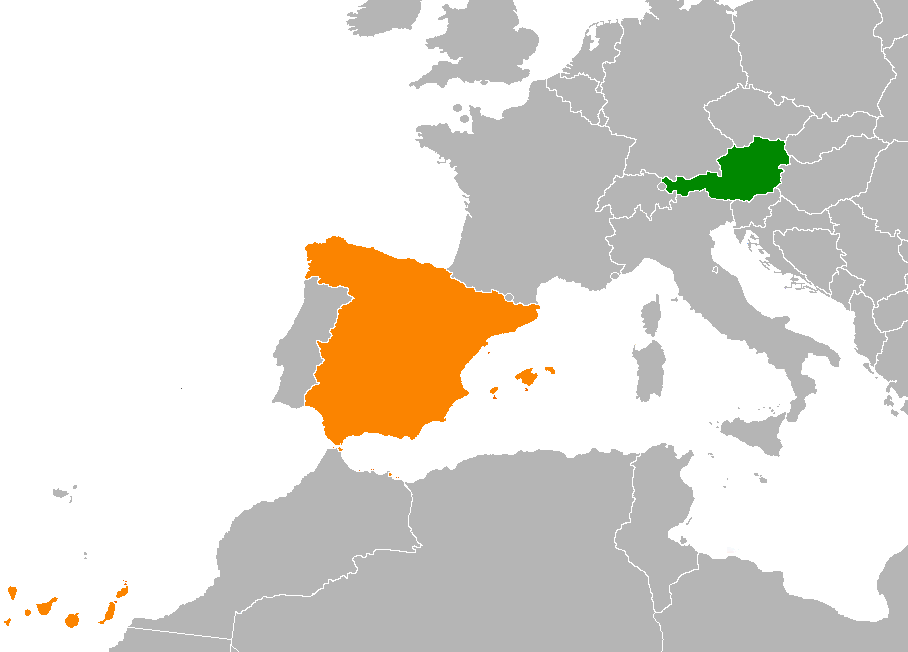
- Austria: Spain

Bilateral relations exist between Austria and Spain. Both nations are members of the Council of Europe, European Union, OECD and the United Nations. Spain is a member of NATO. Austria instead is not a member of NATO.

== Historical relationships ==
The historical relations between Austria and Spain are mainly defined by the House of Habsburg's dominance of the Spanish monarchy in the 16th and 17th centuries; from the Treaty of Villafáfila (27 June 1506), in which Felipe I the Beautiful was recognized as king jure uxoris of the Crown of Castile, leaving the Crown of Aragon for his father-in-law, Ferdinand the Catholic; until the death without direct succession of Carlos II the Bewitched (1 November 1700), which provoked the War of Spanish Succession.

During the so-called Austrias mayores (Carlos I and Felipe II), Spain reached the apogee of its influence and power, especially with the incorporation of Portugal and its extensive empire. Conversely, the reigns of the so-called Lesser Austrias (Philip III, Felipe IV and Carlos II), coinciding with the height of the Spanish Golden Age in art and literature, led to what is known as the Decline of Spain: the loss of European hegemony and a deep economic and social crisis.

During World War II, many Spaniards, who had fought on the Republican side during the Spanish Civil War, were imprisoned in the Mauthausen concentration camp and its subcamps in German-annexed Austria.

== Diplomatic relations ==
Relations between Spain and Austria are excellent according to the Spanish Ministry of Foreign Affairs, there being no significant disputes or bilateral tensions or radically different positions on major issues within or outside the scope of the European Union, to which both countries belong. During the formation of the government of Mariano Rajoy, Austria has shown understanding and interest in the profound reforms carried out in Spain, supporting them within the community framework.

== Economic relations ==
The growth of bilateral commercial relations and the overcoming of Spanish imports from Austria by exports from 2011 have been the dominant note in the economic field, together with the good results of tourism, in constant expansion. However, the Spanish investment suffered a severe blow in 2013 with the insolvency of Alpine Bau (100% subsidiary of the FCC), the largest bankruptcy in Austria by volume since World War II, which has meant the parent company losses of about 1,000 million euros.

The bilateral trade registered in 2011 for the first time a favorable surplus to Spain, with an export growth of 21.6%. The Spanish investment accumulated in Austria, about 1,400 million euros in 2012, focused mainly on infrastructure (FCC), hotel (Hotusa and NH), and confection (Inditex and Mango) and metal pipes (Tubacex).

== Resident diplomatic missions ==
- Austria has an embassy in Madrid.
- Spain has an embassy in Vienna.
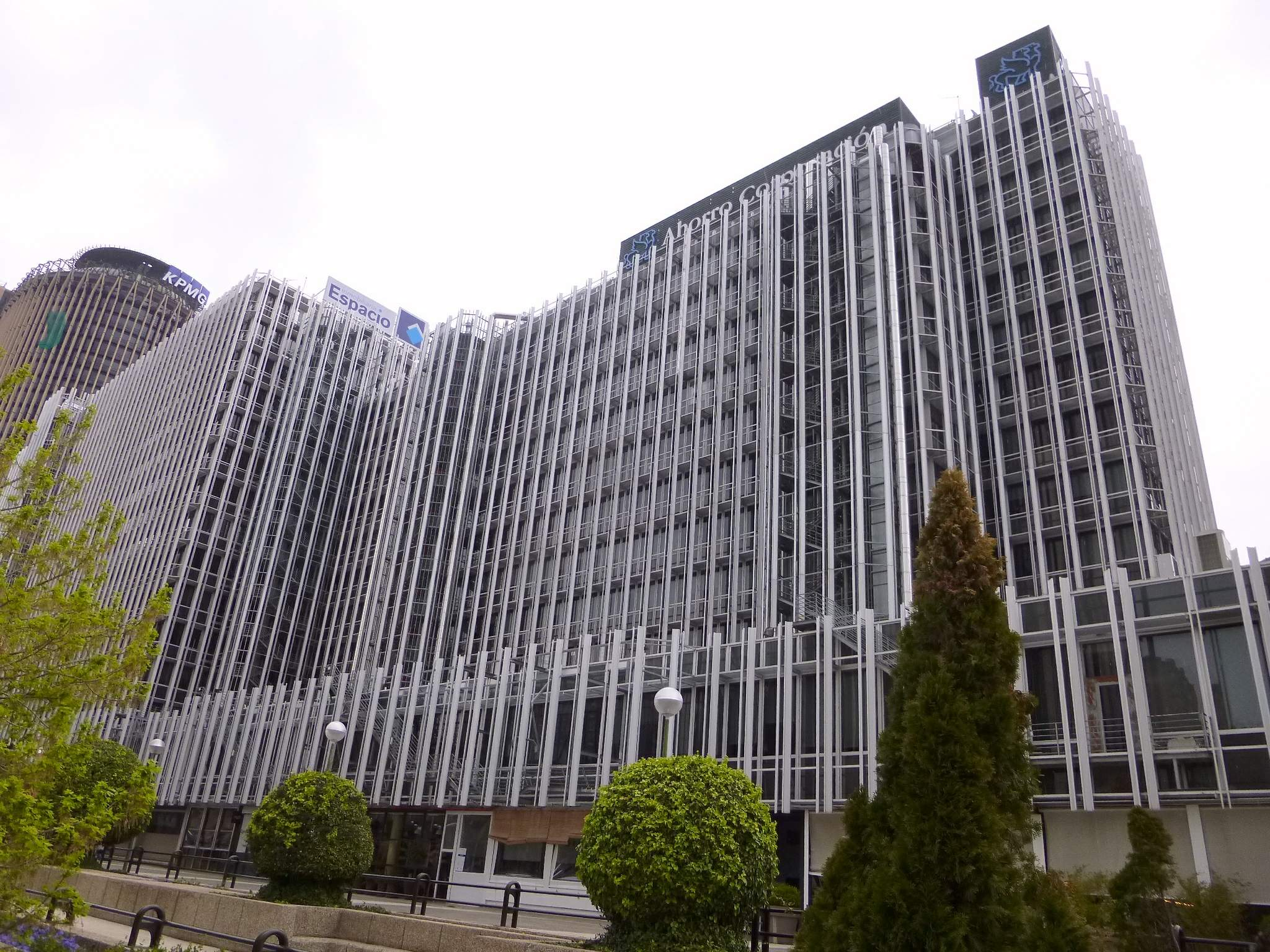
Building hosting the Embassy of Austria in Madrid

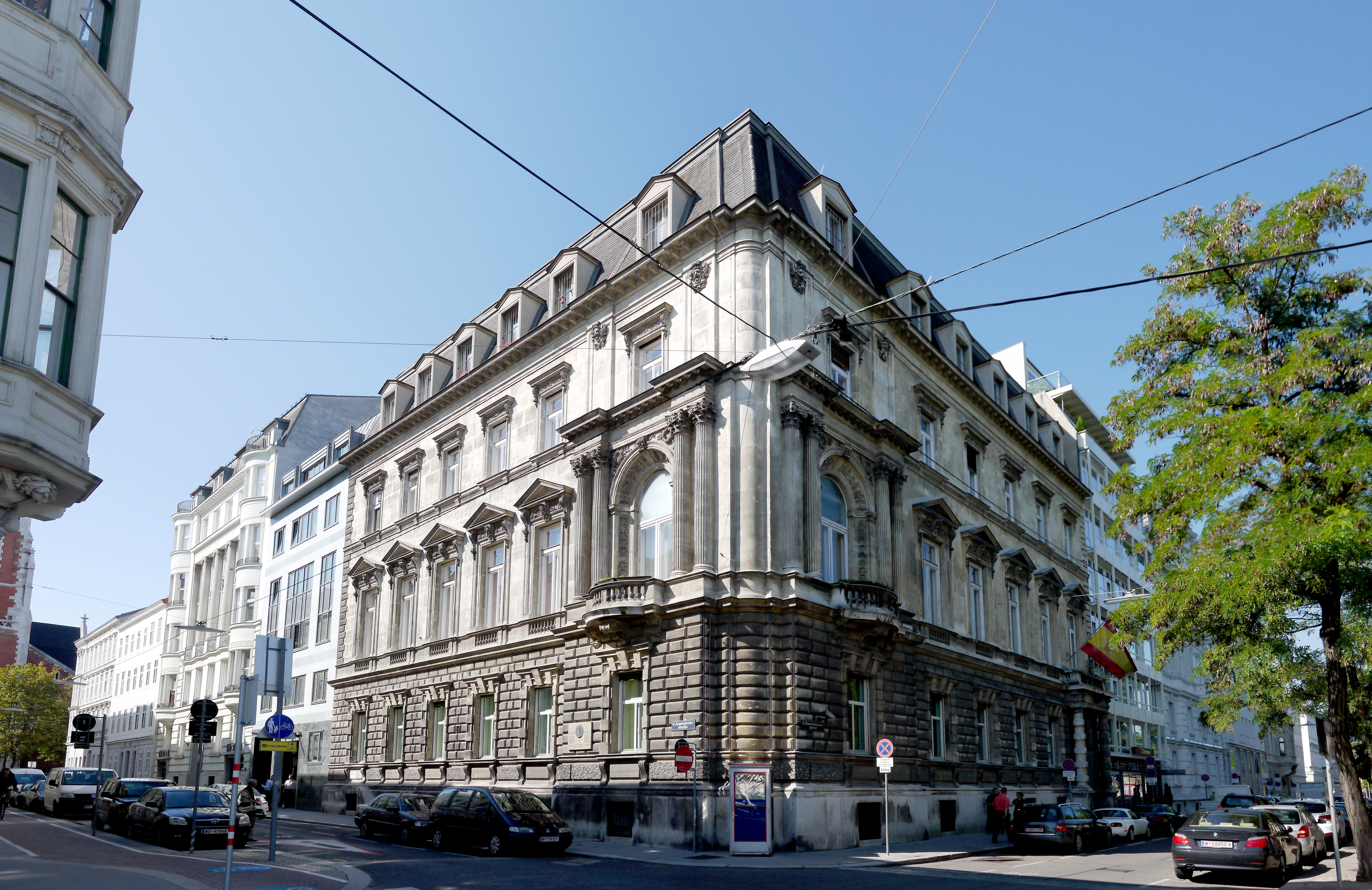
Embassy of Spain in Vienna

== See also ==
- Foreign relations of Austria
- Foreign relations of Spain
