= Austria–Netherlands relations =

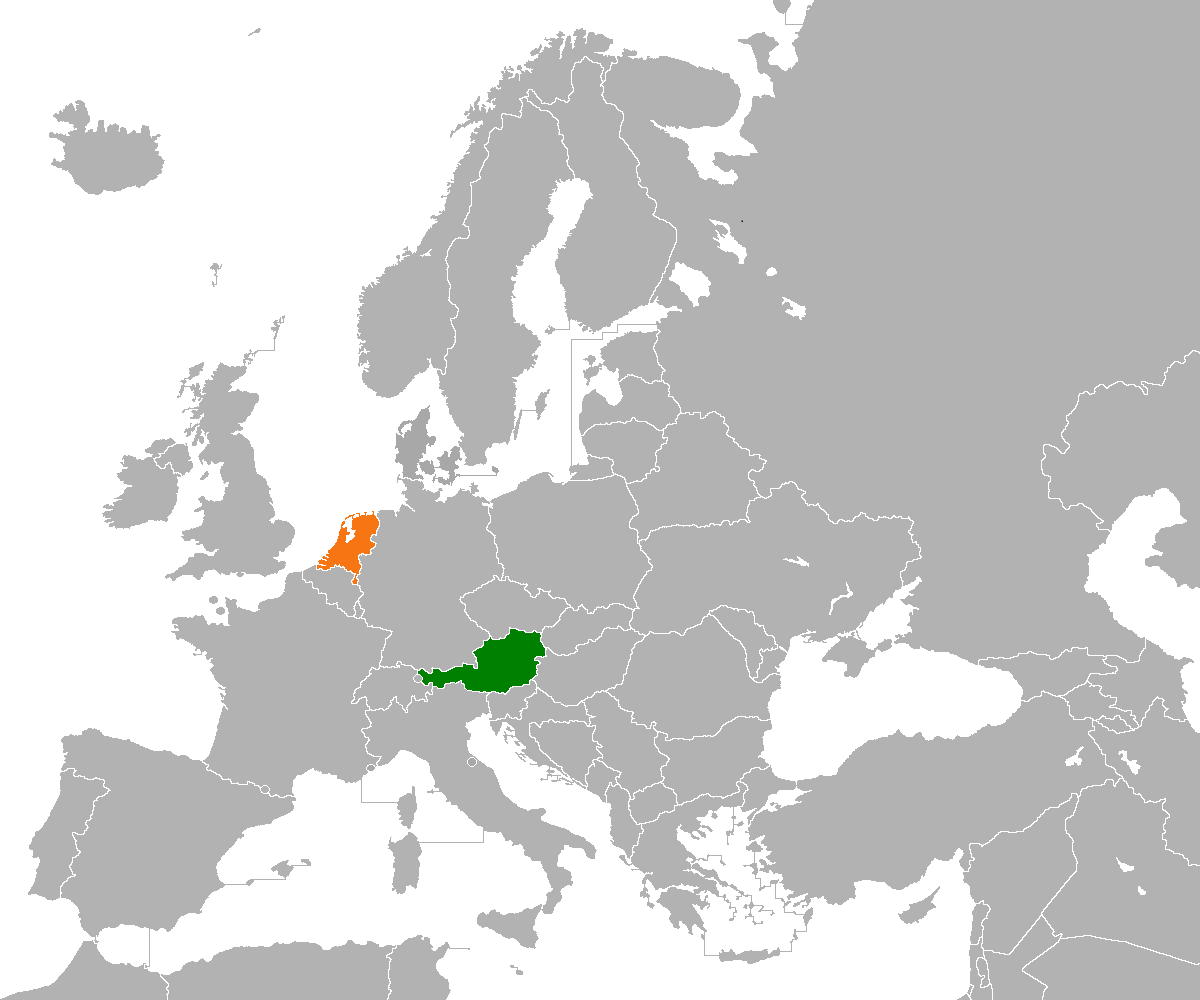
- Austria: Netherlands

Foreign relations exist between Austria and Netherlands. Austria has an embassy in The Hague and 2 honorary consulates (in Amsterdam and Rotterdam). The Netherlands have an embassy in Vienna and 6 honorary consulates (in Bludenz, Innsbruck, Graz, Klagenfurt, Salzburg and Linz). Both countries are full members of the Council of Europe, OECD, OSCE and the European Union.

== History ==
Treaty of Den Haag, The alliance between Austria (Habsburg monarchy) and the United Provinces (Dutch Republic) arose primarily during the early 18th century in the context of the War of the Spanish Succession. Its roots were situated in the balance-of-power politics of Europe, which aimed to counter the expansionist ambitions of Louis XIV’s France.

The Barrier Treaties were a series of agreements signed between 1709 and 1715, aimed at creating a buffer zone between the Dutch Republic and France. These treaties allowed the Dutch to occupy several fortresses in the Habsburg territories. The main goal was to protect the Dutch Republic from French invasions, particularly after their experiences in the 1672 war. The treaties were later modified and ended in 1781, with the southern Netherlands eventually changing its foreign policy and neglecting the defenses of the barrier.

Prior to the 1800s, the southern Low Countries were under Habsburg Austrian control following the Treaty of Utrecht (1713) and Rastatt (1714), forming what was known as the Austrian Netherlands. This imperial rules lasted until the French Revolutionary Wars, when France occupied the territory in 1795 as well invaded Dutch Republic. This meant that both Habsburgs Empire (who had lost the Austrian Netherlands) and the exiled Dutch authorities shared a common opposition to French expansion. During Napoleonic era, the Low Countries were incorporated into the French Empire. Austrian influence in these regions halted during the early 1800s, as Austria and Dutch émigré forces loyal to the House of Orange also coordinated with the Austrians on its campaigns in Italy and central Europe. Following Napoleon’s defeat in 1813–1814 and Waterloo campaigns. After participated in the negotiations at the Congress of Vienna. Austria formally relinquished claims to the former Austrian Netherlands (roughly Luxembourg and Belgium) in favor of creating a buffer state, the United Kingdom of the Netherlands, under Dutch sovereignty.

During World War II, Dutch prisoners of war were among Allied POWs held in the Stalag XVIII-A, Stalag 317/XVIII-C and Oflag XVIII-A German POW camps in German-annexed Austria. Many Dutch Jews were among the prisoners and victims of the Mauthausen concentration camp in Austria.

== Resident diplomatic missions ==
- Austria has an embassy in The Hague.
- the Netherlands has an embassy in Vienna.
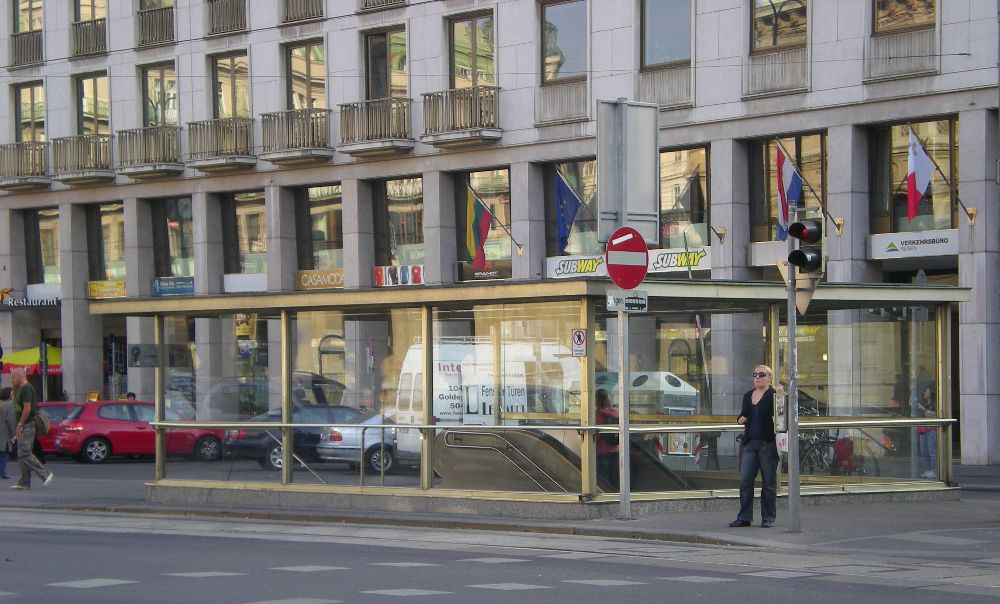
Embassy of the Netherlands in Vienna

== See also ==
- Foreign relations of Austria
- Foreign relations of the Netherlands
