= Foreign relations of Austria =

The 1955 Austrian State Treaty ended the four-power occupation and recognized Austria as an independent and sovereign state. In October 1955, the Federal Assembly passed a constitutional law in which "Austria declares of her own free will her perpetual neutrality." The second section of this law stated that "in all future times Austria will not join any military alliances and will not permit the establishment of any foreign military bases on her territory." Since then, Austria has shaped its foreign policy on the basis of neutrality.

In recent years, however, Austria has begun to reassess its definition of neutrality, granting overflight rights for the UN-sanctioned action against Iraq in 1991, and, since 1995, contemplating participation in the EU's evolving security structure. Also in 1995, it joined the Partnership for Peace, and subsequently participated in peacekeeping missions in Bosnia. Discussion of possible Austrian NATO membership intensified during 1996. ÖVP and Team Stronach aim at moving closer to NATO or a European defense arrangement. SPÖ and FPÖ, in turn, believe continued neutrality is the cornerstone of Austria's foreign policy, and a majority of the population generally supports this stance.

In February 2000, Austria's foreign relations underwent controversy when the ÖVP formed a coalition with the FPÖ after the 1999 election. European governments imposed diplomatic sanctions, and the United States recalled its ambassador. Sanctions were lifted in September 2000 after a three-member panel assessed human rights and political life in Austria. In November 2000, the United States and Austria normalized their relations.

Austrian leaders emphasize the unique role the country plays as an east–west hub and as a moderator between industrialized and developing countries. Austria is active in the United Nations and experienced in UN peacekeeping efforts. It attaches great importance to participation in the Organisation for Economic Co-operation and Development and other international economic organizations, and it has played an active role in the Organization for Security and Cooperation in Europe (OSCE).

Vienna hosts the Secretariat of the OSCE and the headquarters of the International Atomic Energy Agency, the United Nations Industrial Development Organization, and the United Nations Drug Control Programme. Other international organizations based in Vienna include the Organization of Petroleum Exporting Countries, the Organization for International Economic Relations (OiER) and the International Institute for Applied Systems Analysis. Recently, Vienna added the preparatory commission for the Comprehensive Test Ban Treaty Organization and the Wassenaar Arrangement (a technology-transfer control agency) to the list of international organizations it hosts. Furthermore, the Permanent Secretariat of an international territorial treaty for the sustainable development of the Alps called the Alpine Convention is located in Tyrol's capital Innsbruck.

Austria traditionally has been active in "bridge-building to the east," increasing contacts at all levels with Eastern Europe and the states of the former Soviet Union. Austrians maintain a constant exchange of business representatives, investment, trade, political leaders, students, cultural groups, and tourists with the countries of central and eastern Europe. In addition, the Austrian Government and various Austrian organizations provide assistance and training to support the changes underway in the region.

== Diplomatic relations ==
List of countries which Austria maintains diplomatic relations with:

#	Country	Date
1	Denmark	11 November 1918
2	Hungary	20 November 1918
3	France	3 April 1919
4	Italy	10 September 1919
5	United Kingdom	8 November 1919
6	Bulgaria	November 1919
7	Colombia	10 January 1920
8	Sweden	10 January 1920
9	Netherlands	19 January 1920
10	Czech Republic	20 January 1920
11	Uruguay	30 June 1920
12	Belgium	16 August 1920
13	Greece	21 August 1920
14	Romania	27 August 1920
15	Norway	8 October 1920
16	Japan	16 December 1920
17	Poland	6 September 1921
18	United States	8 November 1921
19	Albania	18 February 1922
20	Portugal	4 April 1922
21	Finland	22 April 1922
22	Peru	17 July 1923
23	Argentina	31 December 1923
24	Cuba	15 January 1924
25	Russia	25 February 1924
26	Bolivia	15 May 1924
27	Venezuela	1 September 1924
28	Turkey	11 November 1924
29	Serbia	9 May 1925
30	Switzerland	18 April 1925
31	Brazil	26 May 1925
32	Spain	14 June 1925
33	Iran	26 July 1925
34	Chile	18 September 1925
35	Mexico	14 July 1927
36	Paraguay	19 August 1927
37	Egypt	30 April 1931
38	Iraq	October 1934
39	Luxembourg	17 November 1936
40	Dominican Republic	2 March 1938
—	Holy See	9 August 1946
41	Philippines	17 October 1946
42	Ecuador	27 June 1947
43	Ethiopia	23 July 1948
44	India	10 November 1949
45	Jordan	6 April 1951
46	Ireland	18 May 1951
47	Lebanon	6 December 1951
48	Costa Rica	5 February 1952
49	Syria	7 February 1952
50	El Salvador	19 February 1952
51	Honduras	20 February 1952
52	Afghanistan	30 April 1952
53	Canada	9 August 1952
54	Australia	3 December 1952
55	Pakistan	13 June 1953
56	Thailand	2 July 1953
57	Myanmar	9 July 1953
58	Sri Lanka	23 April 1954
59	Indonesia	20 November 1954
60	Guatemala	9 September 1955
61	South Africa	5 October 1955
62	Panama	18 October 1955
63	Germany	5 January 1956
64	Sudan	24 January 1956
65	Cambodia	21 February 1956
66	Israel	2 March 1956
67	New Zealand	23 October 1956
68	Saudi Arabia	10 September 1957
—	Sovereign Military Order of Malta	6 December 1957
69	Tunisia	2 May 1959
70	Nepal	15 August 1959
71	Morocco	9 December 1959
72	Libya	22 April 1960
73	Senegal	1961
74	Somalia	19 June 1962
75	Malaysia	6 August 1962
76	Cyprus	25 October 1962
77	Nigeria	21 December 1962
78	Algeria	25 January 1963
79	Nicaragua	29 April 1963
80	South Korea	22 May 1963
81	Liberia	25 June 1963
82	Mongolia	1 July 1963
83	Iceland	20 July 1964
84	Kenya	15 December 1964
85	Niger	30 January 1965
86	Zambia	18 March 1965
87	Kuwait	6 June 1965
88	Rwanda	14 September 1965
89	Benin	November 1965
90	Malawi	2 December 1965
91	Uganda	26 January 1966
92	Singapore	16 March 1966
93	Tanzania	31 August 1966
94	Malta	9 November 1966
95	Guinea	1966
96	Laos	1 September 1967
97	Jamaica	2 November 1967
98	Barbados	27 November 1967
99	Ghana	7 December 1967
100	Lesotho	1967
101	Madagascar	1967
102	Cameroon	29 March 1968
103	Botswana	5 December 1968
104	Ivory Coast	14 January 1969
105	Yemen	11 July 1969
106	Burundi	1969
107	Mauritania	23 January 1970
108	Mali	21 February 1970
109	Gabon	1 April 1970
110	Burkina Faso	9 December 1970
111	Central African Republic	1970
112	Eswatini	1970
113	Gambia	1971
114	Togo	1971
115	China	28 May 1971
116	Bangladesh	4 February 1972
117	Democratic Republic of the Congo	24 July 1972
118	Trinidad and Tobago	2 August 1972
119	Vietnam	1 December 1972
120	Qatar	5 March 1973
121	Guyana	3 April 1973
122	Oman	18 December 1973
123	United Arab Emirates	10 March 1974
124	North Korea	17 December 1974
125	Sierra Leone	1 March 1975
126	Bahrain	18 May 1975
127	Mauritius	10 February 1976
128	Equatorial Guinea	1 March 1976
129	Papua New Guinea	24 June 1976
130	Guinea-Bissau	15 October 1976
131	Mozambique	19 October 1976
132	Seychelles	12 January 1977
133	Suriname	3 May 1977
134	Angola	25 October 1977
135	Chad	10 January 1978
136	Maldives	1 March 1978
137	Cape Verde	29 April 1978
138	Republic of the Congo	12 July 1978
139	Bahamas	23 October 1978
140	Grenada	3 November 1978
141	Zimbabwe	11 July 1980
142	Liechtenstein	29 May 1981
143	Djibouti	18 January 1983
144	Haiti	16 December 1983
145	Antigua and Barbuda	25 March 1985
146	Brunei	2 December 1985
147	Vanuatu	29 December 1986
148	Belize	14 September 1989
149	San Marino	2 April 1987
150	Bhutan	8 May 1989
151	Namibia	5 October 1990
152	Saint Vincent and the Grenadines	29 October 1990
153	Lithuania	28 August 1991
154	Estonia	8 January 1992
155	Croatia	15 January 1992
156	Slovenia	15 January 1992
157	Latvia	19 January 1992
158	Armenia	24 January 1992
159	Ukraine	24 January 1992
160	Belarus	5 February 1992
161	Kazakhstan	14 February 1992
162	Azerbaijan	20 February 1992
163	Georgia	25 March 1992
164	Kyrgyzstan	25 March 1992
165	Moldova	25 March 1992
166	Tajikistan	25 March 1992
167	Uzbekistan	25 March 1992
168	Bosnia and Herzegovina	8 April 1992
169	Fiji	22 May 1992
170	Federated States of Micronesia	1 July 1992
171	Turkmenistan	16 October 1992
172	Samoa	18 December 1992
173	Slovakia	1 January 1993
174	Marshall Islands	1 March 1993
175	São Tomé and Príncipe	3 May 1993
176	Eritrea	9 March 1994
177	North Macedonia	23 December 1994
178	Andorra	20 March 1995
179	Dominica	1999
180	Saint Kitts and Nevis	1999
181	Timor-Leste	20 September 2002
182	Palau	1 December 2004
183	Kiribati	2004
184	Saint Lucia	2 June 2005
185	Solomon Islands	13 October 2005
186	Nauru	9 November 2005
187	Tuvalu	23 March 2006
188	Montenegro	12 July 2006
189	Comoros	8 March 2007
190	Monaco	16 April 2007
—	Kosovo	28 February 2008
191	South Sudan	21 September 2011
192	Tonga	16 February 2024

== Bilateral relations ==
Austria maintains significant bilateral relations with several countries.

=== Multilateral ===
Organization	Formal Relations Began	Notes
NATO		See Austria–NATO relations Austria is not a member of NATO.

=== Africa ===
Country	Formal Relations Began	Notes
Burkina Faso	9 December 1970	Austria is accredited to Burkina Faso from its embassy in Dakar, Senegal.
Kenya	15 December 1964	See Austria–Kenya relations

=== Americas ===
Country	Formal Relations Began	Notes
Argentina	31 December 1923	See Argentina–Austria relations
Brazil	26 May 1925	See Austria–Brazil relations
Canada	9 August 1952	See Austria–Canada relations
Chile	18 September 1925	See Austria–Chile relations
Colombia	10 January 1920	see Austria–Colombia relations
Mexico	14 July 1927	See Austria–Mexico relations
Peru	17 July 1923	See Austria–Peru relations
United States	8 November 1921	See Austria–United States relations
Uruguay	30 June 1920	See Austria–Uruguay relations

=== Asia ===
Country	Formal Relations Began	Notes
Armenia	24 January 1992	See Armenia–Austria relations
Azerbaijan	20 February 1992	See Austria–Azerbaijan relations
Bangladesh	4 February 1972	See Austria–Bangladesh relations
China	28 May 1971	See Austria–China relations
Georgia	25 March 1992	See Austria–Georgia relations Georgia opened its embassy in Vienna in 1996.
India	10 November 1949	See Austria–India relations
Indonesia	20 November 1954	See Austria–Indonesia relations: Austria recognises Indonesia as a stable and reliable partner, and both countries enjoy excellent relations.
Iran	26 July 1925	See Austria–Iran relations: On 3 July 2018 Austria announced it was revoking the diplomatic immunity of an Iranian diplomat in Vienna, due to his alleged role in a French bomb plot.
Israel	2 March 1956	See Austria–Israel relations
Japan	16 December 1920	See Austria–Japan relations
Kazakhstan	14 February 1992	See Austria–Kazakhstan relations
Malaysia	6 August 1962	See Austria–Malaysia relations
Pakistan	13 June 1953	See Austria–Pakistan relations
Philippines	17 October 1946	See Austria–Philippines relations
Saudi Arabia	10 September 1957	See Austria–Saudi Arabia relations
South Korea	22 May 1963	See Austria–South Korea relations
Syria	7 February 1952	See Austria–Syria relations: Austria has an embassy in Damascus.; Syria has an embassy in Vienna.; Relations between Austria and Syria are described as good and respectful.; First official contacts between Austria and Syria can be dated back to 1840.
Turkey	11 November 1924	See Austria–Turkey relations
Vietnam	1 December 1972	See Austria–Vietnam relations

=== Europe ===
Country	Formal Relations Began	Notes
Albania	18 February 1922	See Albania–Austria relations
Bosnia and Herzegovina	8 April 1992	See Austria–Bosnia and Herzegovina relations
Bulgaria	November 1919	See Austria–Bulgaria relations
Croatia	15 January 1992	See Austria–Croatia relations
Cyprus	25 October 1962	See Austria–Cyprus relations
Czech Republic	20 January 1920	See Austria–Czech Republic relations
Denmark	11 November 1918	See Austria–Denmark relations
Finland	22 April 1922	See Austria–Finland relations
France	3 April 1919	See Austria–France relations
Germany	5 January 1956	See Austria–Germany relations
Greece	21 August 1920	See Austria–Greece relations
Hungary	20 November 1918	See Austria–Hungary relations
Italy	10 September 1919	See Austria–Italy relations
Kosovo	28 February 2008	See Austria–Kosovo relations
Lithuania	28 August 1991	Austria is accredited to Lithuania from its Ministry of Foreign Affairs in Vienna.
Moldova	25 March 1992	See Austria–Moldova relations
Montenegro	12 July 2006	See Austria–Montenegro relations
Netherlands	19 January 1920	See Austria–Netherlands relations
Poland	6 September 1921	See Austria–Poland relations
Romania	27 August 1920	See Austria–Romania relations
Russia	25 February 1924	See Austria–Russia relations
Serbia	9 May 1925	See Austria–Serbia relations
Slovakia	1 January 1993	See Austria–Slovakia relations
Slovenia	15 January 1992	See Austria–Slovenia relations
Spain	14 June 1925	See Austria–Spain relations
Sweden	10 January 1920	See Austria–Sweden relations
Switzerland	18 April 1925	See Austria–Switzerland relations
Ukraine	24 January 1992	See Austria–Ukraine relations
United Kingdom	8 November 1919	See Austria–United Kingdom relations: Austria maintains an embassy in London.; The United Kingdom is accredited to Austria through its embassy in Vienna.; Both countries share common membership of the Council of Europe, the European Court of Human Rights, the International Criminal Court, the OSCE, and the World Trade Organization. Bilaterally the two countries have a Double Taxation Convention.

== See also ==
- List of diplomatic missions in Austria
- List of diplomatic missions of Austria
- Federal Ministry for European and International Affairs (Austria)
- Visa requirements for Austrian citizens
