= Nina Vaskunlahti =

Finnish diplomat

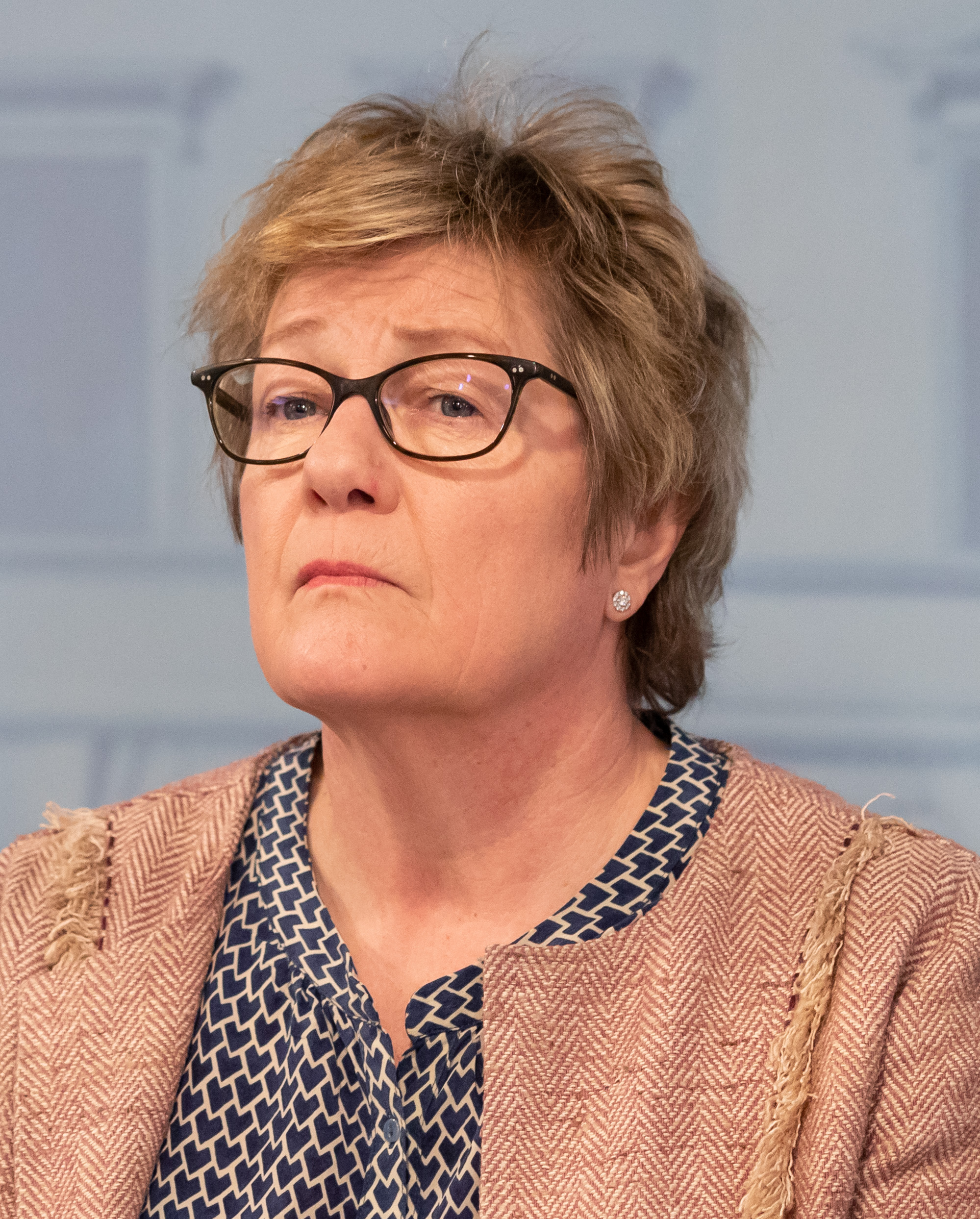

Nina Vaskunlahti is a Finnish diplomat. She currently serves as the Under-Secretary of State for external economic relations. She was the Finnish Ambassador to India in New Delhi from 2016 to 2019. Prior to that she was a Finnish Ambassador to Turkey in Ankara between 2012 and 2016. She started working with the Ministry for Foreign Affairs in 1984.

Vaskunlahti has worked as a department head at the East Department of the Ministry for Foreign Affairs and as a Coreper I Ambassador at the Permanent Representation of Finland to the EU.
