= Klestil =

Klestil is a surname, and may refer to:

- Thomas Klestil (1932–2004), Austrian politician and diplomat; President of Austria (1992–2004)
- Edith Klestil (1932–2011), first wife of Thomas Klestil
- Margot Klestil-Löffler (born 1954), Austrian diplomat and second wife of Thomas Klestil
