= Austria–Soviet Union relations =

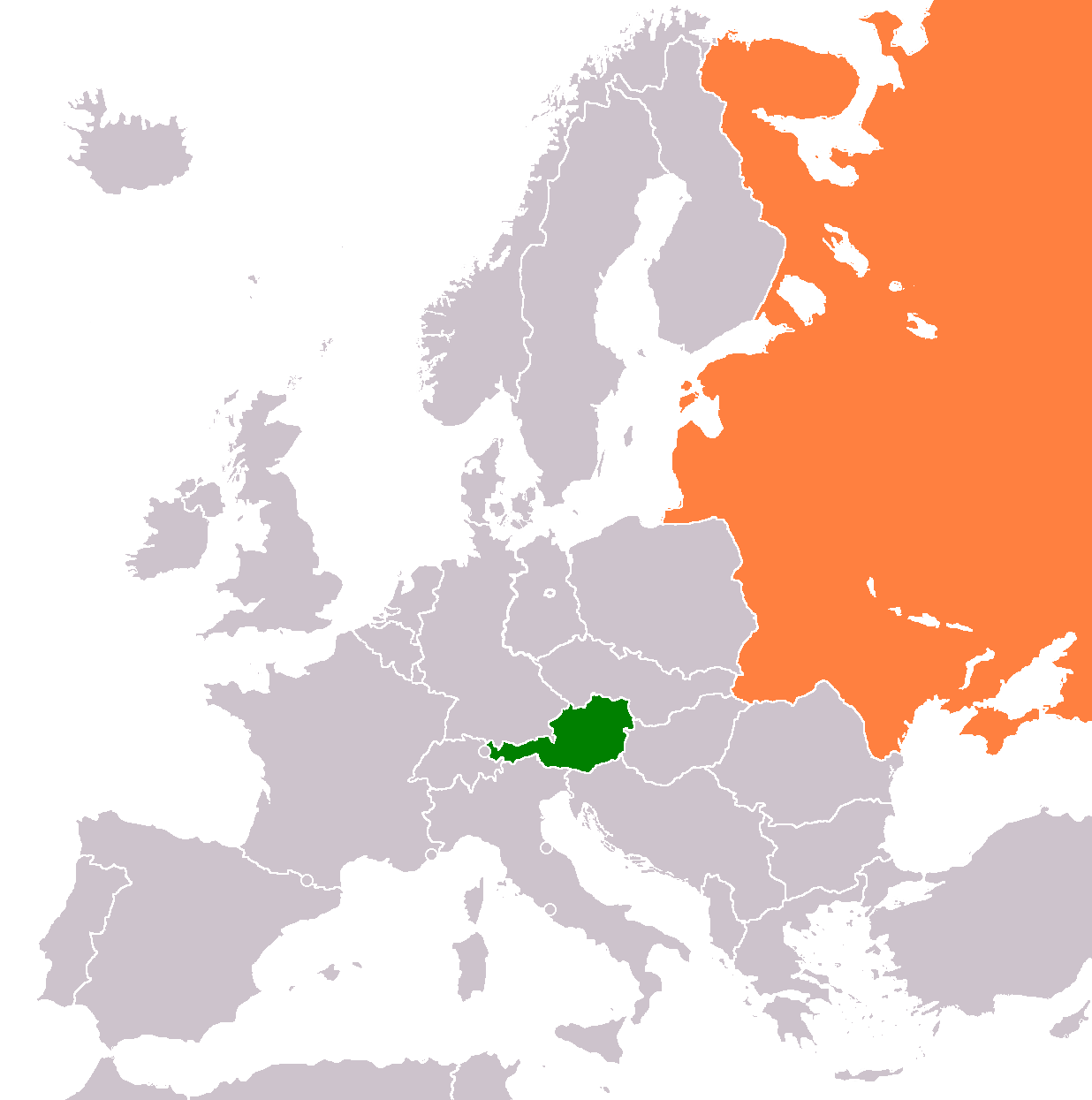

- Austria: Soviet Union

Diplomatic mission
- Embassy of Austria, Moscow: Embassy of the Soviet Union, Vienna

Austria–Soviet Union relations were established in 1924, discontinued in 1938 following German annexation of Austria and renewed following Austrian independence after World War II.

The rump Austrian state left after the war eventually joined with Nazi Germany in the Anschluss, and was therefore part of the German invasion of the Soviet Union.

After the war Austria was occupied by the allied armies, separated from Germany, and divided into four zones of occupation. The Soviets did not create a separate socialist government in their zone as they did in East Germany. Instead, Austria was required to sign the Austrian State Treaty of 1955 under which it pledged total neutrality in the Cold War confrontation between the Soviet Union and the U.S.-led West. The treaty also mandates that Austria never seek to unify with other German-speaking nations, and perpetual maintenance of the Soviet War Memorial in Vienna.

In 1968, Austria became the first Western European country to begin imports of natural gas from the Soviet Union. Subsequently, Europe's main gas hub was set up at Baumgarten an der March on Austria's eastern border with Czechoslovakia, now Slovakia.

== See also ==
- Foreign relations of Austria
- Foreign relations of the Soviet Union
- Embassy of Austria, Moscow
- Embassy of Russia, Vienna
- Austria–Russia relations
- Allied-occupied Austria
- Austria–Yugoslavia relations
