= Margot Klestil-Löffler =

Austrian diplomat

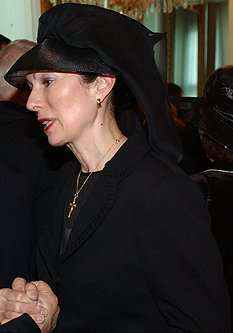
- Margot Klestil-Löffler at her husband's funeral (2004)

Ambassador of Austria to Russia
- In office December 2009 – December 2014
- President: Heinz Fischer
- Preceded by: Martin Vukovich
- Succeeded by: Emil Brix

Ambassador of Austria to the Czech Republic
- In office 2004–2009
- President: Heinz Fischer
- Preceded by: Klas Daublebsky
- Succeeded by: Ferdinand Trauttmansdorff

First Lady of Austria
- In role 23 December 1998 – 6 July 2004
- President: Thomas Klestil
- Preceded by: Edith Klestil
- Succeeded by: Margit Fischer

Personal details
- Born: Margot Löffler; 3 April 1954 (age 72) Dobersberg, Lower Austria
- Spouse: Thomas Klestil (m. 1998; died 2004)

Margot Klestil-Löffler (born 4 March 1954 in Dobersberg, Lower Austria) is an Austrian diplomat, former First Lady of Austria from 1998 to 2004, and the widow of Thomas Klestil, the former federal president of Austria. She served as the Austrian Ambassador to the Czech Republic from 2004 to 2009 and Ambassador to Russia 2009 to 2014. She has been serving as Russia envoy under Foreign Minister Karin Kneissl since 2018.

== Early life and career ==
Margot Löffler was born in Dobersberg, Lower Austria. Her parents, Karl and Gerda Löffler, were farmers. She speaks German, English, French, Russian and Czech.

After her diplomatic career in Moscow and Bangkok, Löffler joined Thomas Klestil's office, who was by that time general secretary in the Austrian ministry of foreign affairs. When Thomas Klestil ran for the presidency in 1992, she was managing his election campaign.

== First Lady of Austria ==
During his first term of office, it became public that Klestil and Löffler had a love affair. Klestil divorced his first wife Edith and married Margot Löffler on 23 December 1998. She became the country's first lady, but continued her job in the foreign ministry, which led to the strange situation that she was ranking higher than her former boss, Foreign Minister Benita Ferrero-Waldner, on state visits or other official occasions.

When Thomas Klestil died in office on 6 July 2004, both his wives attended the funeral service held in St. Stephen's Cathedral in Vienna. The Roman Catholic Archbishop of Vienna, Cardinal Christoph Schönborn, welcomed Edith Klestil first.

== Later career ==
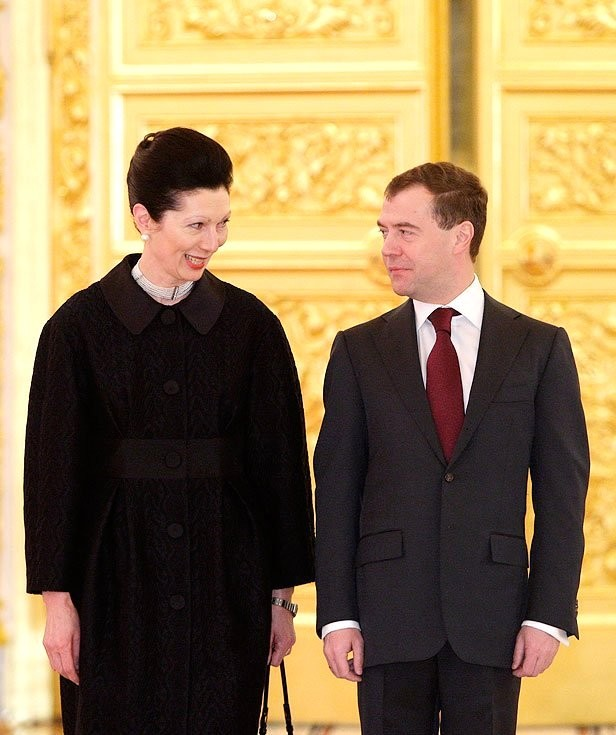
Klestil-Loffler with former President of Russia, Dmitry Medvedev, in 2010

After her husband's death on 6 July 2004, Klestil-Löffler was appointed Austrian ambassador to the Czech Republic. From December 2009 to December 2014, she was Austrian ambassador to the Russian Federation. From 2017 to 2018, Klestil-Löffler was Deputy Secretary General of the Central European Initiative (CEI) in Trieste, Italy, under Italian diplomat Giovanni Caracciolo di Vietri.

In 2018, Klestil-Löffler was appointed as special representative for Russia by Austrian Minister for Europe, Integration and Foreign Affairs Karin Kneissl. She acted as a mediator in dialogue between Moscow and Washington later in 2018.

Klestil-Löffler made headlines during the 2014 Winter Olympics in Sochi when she tried to take a family of puppies from America's silver medallist Gus Kenworthy.

== Honours ==
- Portugal: Grand Cross of the Order of Prince Henry (2003)

Honorary titles
Preceded by Edith Klestil	First Lady of Austria; 1998–2004	Succeeded by Margit Fischer
Diplomatic posts
Preceded by Klas Daublebsky	Austrian Ambassador to the Czech Republic; 2004–2009	Succeeded by Ferdinand Trauttmansdorff
Preceded by Martin Vukovich	Austrian Ambassador to Russia; 2009–2014	Succeeded by Emil Brix
