= Kirchschläger =

Kirchschläger, sometimes also spelled Kirchschlaeger or Kirchschlager, is a German surname. Notable people with this surname include:

- Angelika Kirchschlager (born 1965), Austrian mezzo-soprano
- Herma Kirchschläger (1916–2009), Austrian first lady
- Rudolf Kirchschläger (1915–2000), Austrian politician
