= First Lady of Austria =

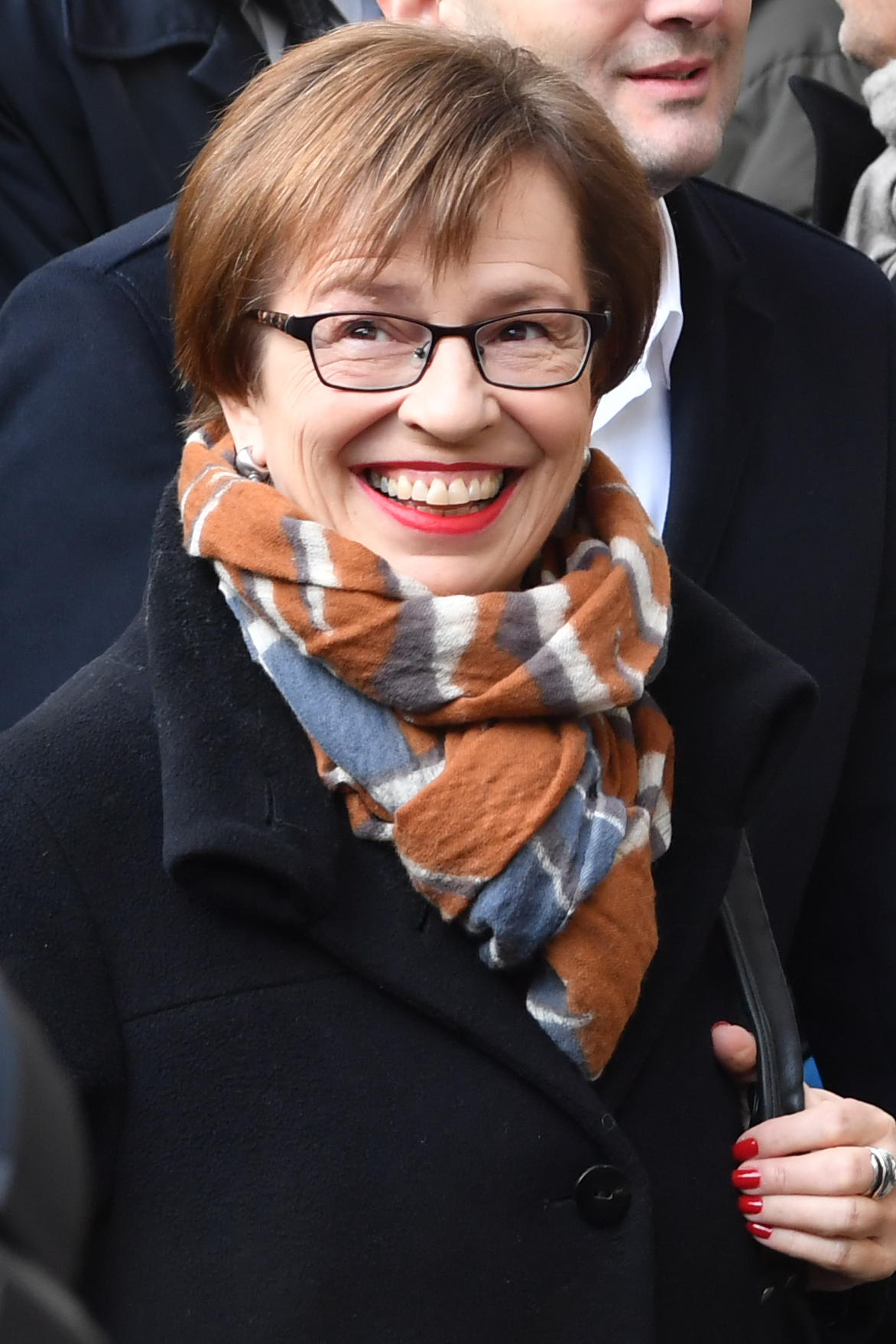
- Incumbent; Doris Schmidauer since 26 January 2017
- Inaugural holder: Luise Renner
- Formation: 20 December 1945

First Lady of Austria (German: Ehepartner des österreichischen Bundespräsidenten) is the title attributed to the wife (or, in place of a wife, a designee, such as a daughter) of the president of Austria. The current first lady is Doris Schmidauer, wife of President Alexander Van der Bellen, who has held the position since 26 January 2017.

== First ladies of the First Austrian Republic (1919–1934) ==
First Lady	Term begins	Term ends	President of Austria	Notes
Emilie Hainisch	9 December 1920	10 December 1928	Michael Hainisch	
Leopoldine Miklas	10 December 1928	13 March 1938	Wilhelm Miklas	

== First ladies of the Second Austrian Republic (1945–present) ==
First Lady	Term begins	Term ends	President of Austria	Notes
Luise Renner	20 December 1945	31 December 1950	Karl Renner	
Position vacant	21 June 1951	4 January 1957	Theodor Körner	Körner was a bachelor.
Martha Kyrle	22 May 1957	28 February 1965	Adolf Schärf	Schärf's wife, Hilda Schärf, died in 1956 before he became president. Their daughter, Martha Kyrle, served as First Lady during his tenure in office. President Schärf died in office.
Margarete Jonas	9 June 1965	24 April 1974	Franz Jonas	
Herma Kirchschläger	8 July 1974	8 July 1986	Rudolf Kirchschläger	
Elisabeth Waldheim	8 July 1986	8 July 1992	Kurt Waldheim	
Edith Klestil	8 July 1992	1994	Thomas Klestil	Edith Klestil left Thomas Klestil in January 1994 following revelations of his affair with his aide, Margot Löffler. Edith Klestil was voted Austria's "Woman of the Year" in March 1994. The Klestils divorced on 17 September 1998 after forty year of marriage and a four-year separation.
Margot Klestil-Löffler	23 December 1998 (marriage)	6 July 2004	Thomas Klestil	President Klestil and Margot Löffler initially agreed to separate in January 1994 following the revelations of their affair, but later reconnected. They married on 23 December 1998, just a few months after Klestil's divorce from Edith Klestil. President Klestil died in office on 6 July 2004. Klestil-Löffler, a diplomat, served as Ambassador to the Czech Republic (2004–2009) and Russia (2009–2014).
Margit Fischer	8 July 2004	8 July 2016	Heinz Fischer	
Doris Schmidauer	26 January 2017	Present	Alexander Van der Bellen	Schmidauer and Van der Bellen married in December 2015. Schmidauer, who is head of personnel and management of the Green Party Parliamentary Club as of January 2017, has expressed a desire to continue working for the Green Party while she serves as Austria's First Lady.
