= Russians in Austria =

There are 5,500 people of Russian origin living in Austria, mostly in Vienna and Salzburg.

There has been a Russian community in Vienna since the 17th century. The first Russians came in Austria for business and educational reasons. In the 1920s, the community grew after the Russian Civil War. Some more Russians came to Austria in the 1990s.

The Russian Embassy School in Vienna serves Russian families in the city.

== See also ==
- Demographics of Austria
- Russian diaspora
- Russians
- Austria–Russia relations
