= Viktor Lazarev =

Soviet art historian

- Born: Viktor Nikitich Lazarev; 3 September 1897 (22 August 1897 O.S.); Moscow, Soviet Union
- Died: 1 February 1976 (aged 78); Moscow, Soviet Union
- Resting place: Vagankovo Cemetery
- Education: Doctor of Arts
- Alma mater: Moscow State University
- Occupation: Art historian
- Employer: Moscow State University
- Parent: Nikita Lazarev
- Awards: USSR State Prize

Viktor Nikitich Lazarev (Russian: Ви́ктор Ники́тич Ла́зарев; 3 September [22 August O.S.] 1897 – 1 February 1976) was a Soviet and Russian art critic and historian who specialized in medieval Byzantine, Russian, and Armenian religious art. He was the son of Nikita Lazarev, a Moscow architect, and was related by blood to Wassily Kandinsky.

Viktor studied at the Moscow State University in 1917–1920, and graduated from the Faculty of History and Philology. From 1924 to 1936 he worked as a Chief Curator, head of the art gallery department, and deputy director for Research at the Pushkin Museum of Fine Arts. In 1945 he was flown into Berlin to supervise the looting of art treasures from the Zoo Tower, including the Pergamon Altar. He later taught at the Moscow State University, and since 1961 headed the faculty of History of Foreign Art. The faculty library was named "Lazarev cabinet" in his honour. He is buried at the Vagankovo Cemetery.

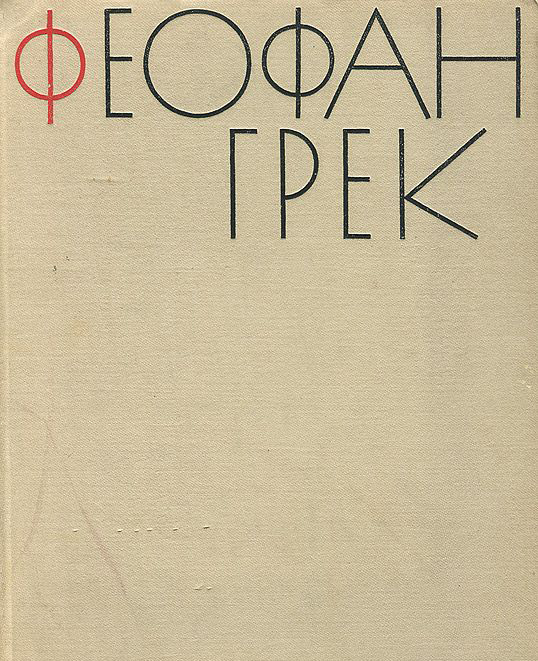
Theophanes the Greek and His School, 1961.

Lazarev was a member of the Academy of Sciences of the Soviet Union since 1943. The Art History Institute in Moscow owes its origin to Lazarev's efforts. His magnum opus is The History of Byzantine Painting, published in 2 volumes in 1947 and 1948. It was translated into Italian in an expanded and revised version as Storia della pittura bizantina (1967). Lazarev was also known for his many writings on the Italian Renaissance, its beginnings and the evolution of Western portrait painting.

== Works ==
- Portrait in European Art of the 17th Century (Russian: Портрет в европейском искусстве XVII века), 1937
- Origins of the Italian Renaissance (Russian: Происхождение итальянского Возрождения), 1956–1959
- Andrei Rublev and Rublev's School (Russian: Андрей Рублёв и его школа), 1966
- Old Italian Masters (Russian: Старые итальянские мастера), 1972
- Kievan Rus' Mosaics and Frescoes (Russian: Древнерусские мозаики и фрески), 1973
- Byzantine and Kievan Rus' Art (Russian: Византийское и древнерусское искусство), 1978
