= Elisabeth Waldheim =

Austrian political figure and first lady of Austria (1922-2017)

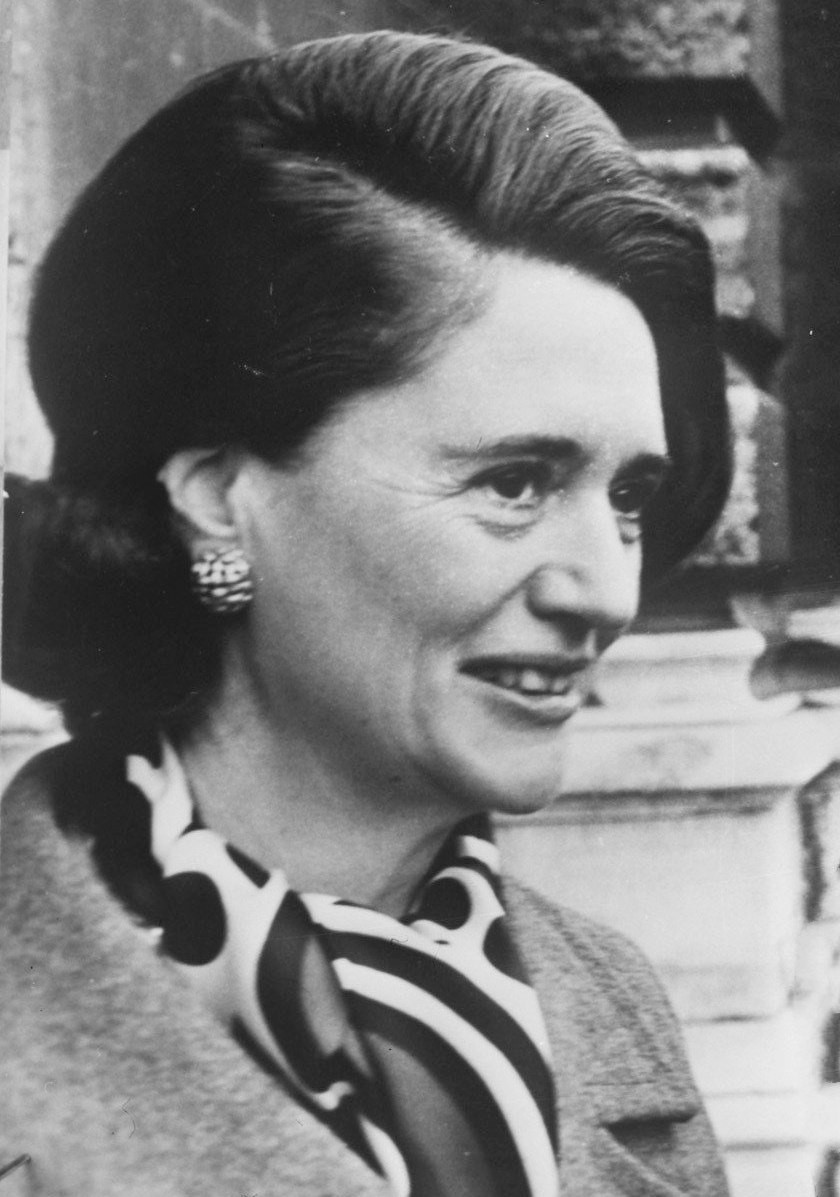

First Lady of Austria
- In role 8 July 1986 – 8 July 1992
- President: Kurt Waldheim
- Preceded by: Herma Kirchschläger
- Succeeded by: Edith Klestil

Personal details
- Born: Elisabeth Ritschel; 13 April 1922 Vienna, Austria
- Died: 28 February 2017 (aged 94) Vienna, Austria
- Spouse: Kurt Waldheim (m. 1944; died 2007)
- Children: Lieselotte; Gerhard; Christa

Elisabeth "Sissy" Waldheim (née Ritschel; 13 April 1922 – 28 February 2017) was an Austrian political figure and the wife of Kurt Waldheim, the UN Secretary-General and President of Austria. She was the First Lady of Austria from 1986 to 1992.

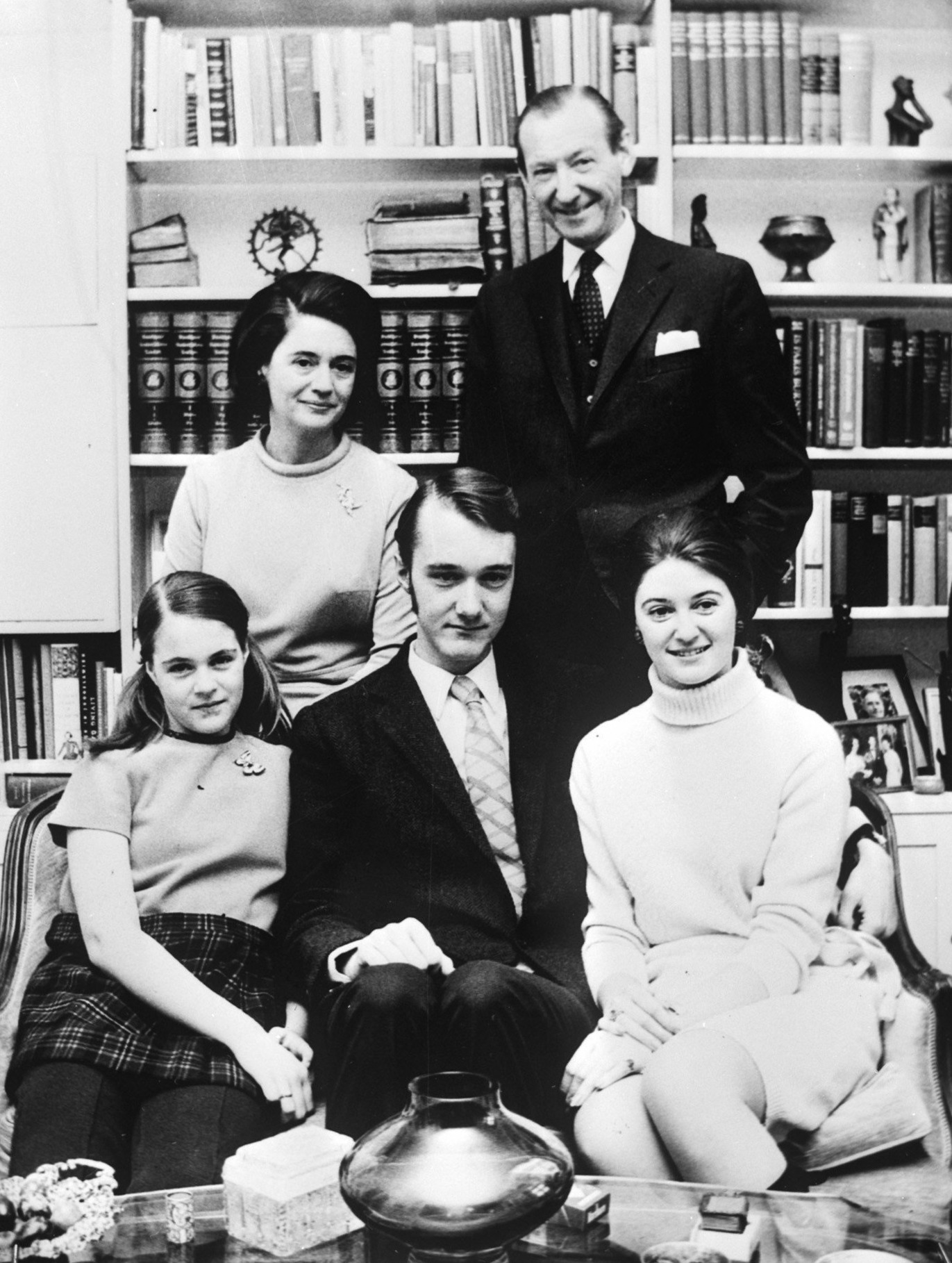
Waldheim with family c. 1971

She was born in Vienna as the eldest of three sisters to Wilhelm Ritschel and his wife Hildegard. Her paternal grandfather was a military official in the imperial army. After the fall of the Habsburg Empire, he became an entrepreneur. Elisabeth was named after the former Austrian empress of the same name and nicknamed "Sissy".

Waldheim decided to study law at University of Vienna, where she first met Kurt Waldheim. On August 19, 1944, in the midst of the Second World War, the couple married in Vienna. Their first daughter, Lieselotte, was born in 1945. According to her husband's New York Times obituary, "[s]he was an ardent Nazi who before the war had renounced her Roman Catholic faith and joined the League of German Maidens, the young women’s equivalent of the Hitler Youth. She applied for Nazi Party membership as soon as she was old enough, and was accepted in 1941".

She gave up her job in order to support her husband's long diplomatic and political career. He became the Foreign Minister of Austria from 1968 to 1970 and UN Secretary General from 1972 to 1981. In 1986, he was elected President of Austria, and she became Austria's first lady.

The couple had three children: daughter Lieselotte Waldheim-Natural works for the United Nations, daughter Christa Waldheim-Karas became an artist (she is married to Othmar Karas, Austrian Member of the European Parliament), and son Gerhard Waldheim is an investment banker. She spoke German, English, and French.. She died on 28 February 2017 at the age of 94. She left behind her three children and three grandchildren.
