= Alpine Peace Crossing =

Project commemorating the flight of Jews over the Austrian Krimmler Tauern

Alpine Peace Crossing (APC)
- Formation: 2007
- Headquarters: Krimml, Austria
- Website: alpinepeacecrossing.org

The Association for Active Remembrance Culture Alpine Peace Crossing (Der Verein für aktive Gedenk- und Erinnerungskultur APC) is an Austrian initiative based in Krimml (Salzburg), founded by Salzburg-born Ernst Löschner to commemorate the long-forgotten escape of Jews across the Austrian Alps in 1947. It is dedicated to active remembrance and commemoration work. Once a year, it organises a commemorative hike across the Krimml Tauern along the path of the thousands of Jews who had to flee this way in 1947. Since 2020, the initiative has also published the association's own magazine, Alpendistel.

== History ==
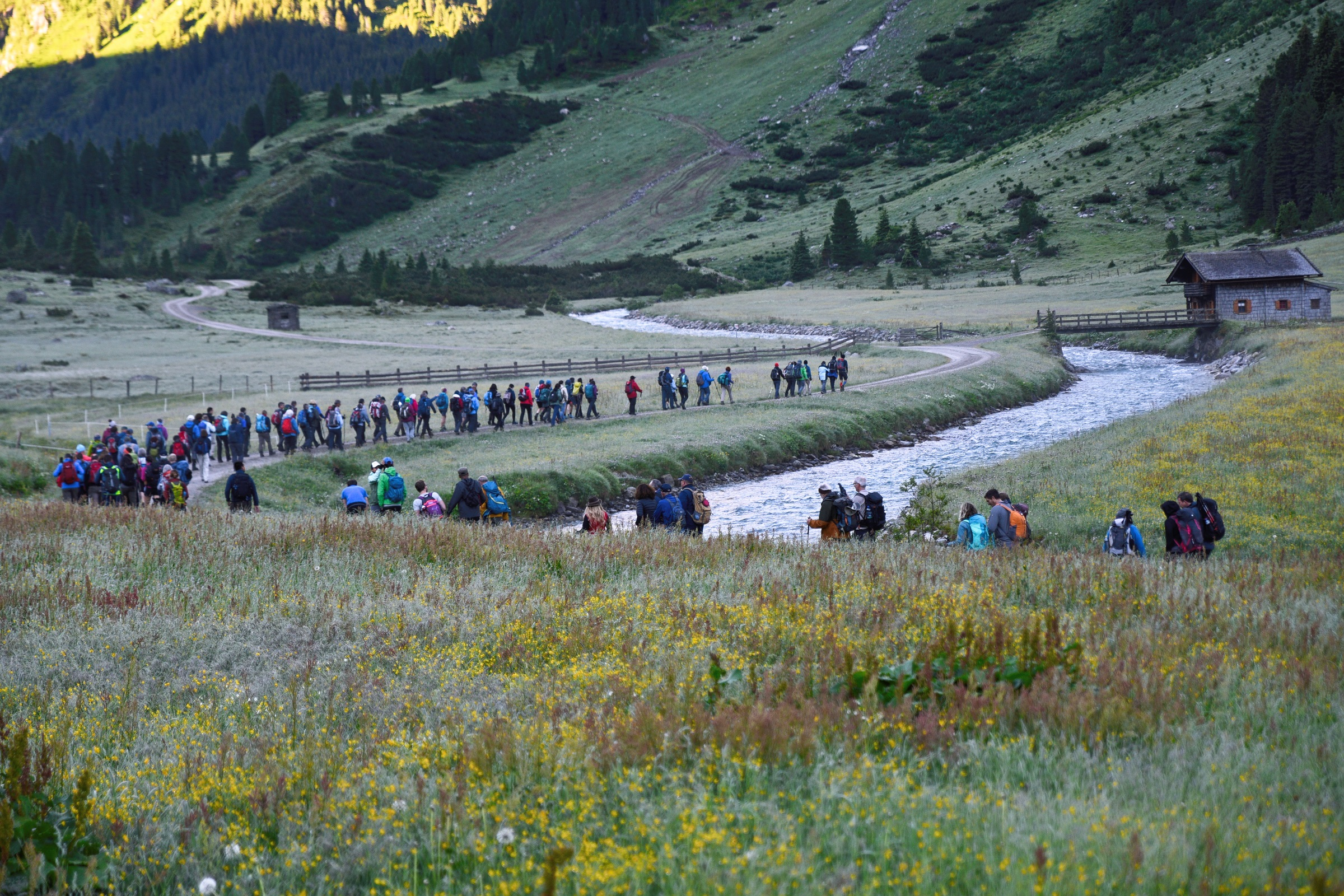
Hike of 2021

The initiative was founded in 2007 by Ernst Löschner, who organised the first commemorative hike across the Krimmler Tauern, from the Krimmler Tauernhaus to Kasern in South Tyrol/Alto Adige in the same year. Since then, the commemorative hike has taken place every year in the early summer; only in 2020 was the event cancelled due to Corona, but it was replaced by a virtual hike.

The event is complemented by an annual dialogue forum. Here, topics around remembrance culture and exodus are discussed with several invited guests. Since 2019, the association has been led by a board composed of historians, educators and students. The association is also supported in its work by an academic advisory board.

In 2019, the APC Peace Prize was awarded for the first time. This award honours people who have distinguished themselves in the area of the Krimml Dialogue Forum, refugee aid, remembrance culture or social welfare.

== Exodus of 1947 ==
Even after the end of the war in 1945, the situation for Jews in Europe was very difficult. Forced resettlements and expropriations, as well as the memory of the terrible war crimes, led many people to want an escape and a new beginning, also in the direction of Palestine (Eretz Israel). Above all, there was an increase in the flight of many Jews from Poland. One reason for this was the Kielce pogrom. The refugees found temporary accommodation in DP camps as so-called "Displaced Persons". There was such a displaced persons' camp in Saalfelden from 1946 until 1949: the Givat Avoda transit camp (now Anton Wallner Barracks) was the starting point for many refugees who chose the route over the Krimmler Tauern.

From Saalfelden, the escape route organised by the Jewish escape organisation Bricha continued over the 2,634-metre-high Krimmler Tauern directly to Italy in order to bypass the French occupation zone and from there to Genoa, from where ships took the refugees to Palestine. With the help of the Bricha, one of the largest organised escape operations in Europe was created between 1945 and 1948. More than half of these refugees took the route via Salzburg.

Two or three times a week, about 200 to 300 refugees passed over the Krimml Tauern. How many people actually fled to Italy along this route is difficult to determine today; estimates vary between 5,000 and 8,000.

== Remembrance ==
The annual commemorative events organised by APC consist of the dialogue forum and a commemorative walk.

In the annual dialogue forum, which takes place on the day before the hike, current and historical topics are presented in short lectures and discussed with invited guests. On the next day, the discussion is followed by the commemorative hike.

The first memorial hike over the Krimmler Tauern Pass to Kasern took place in 2007, and since then it has been held every spring to commemorate the exodus of the Jews in 1947. The starting point is the Krimmler Tauernhaus (1,631 m). On the first section of the trail up to the Windbachalm, participants pass the Exodus Grove. From there, the trail finally leads to the Krimml Tauern Pass, where the descent to Kasern (South Tyrol) follows. Prominent participants in the hike have included the Austrian Federal President Alexander Van der Bellen in 2017, as well as the Israeli ambassadors to Austria since 2007, most recently with Mordechai Rodgold, who also took part in the commemorative events in Saalfelden and Krimml in 2021. Holocaust survivor Marko Feingold, an honorary member of the Alpine Peace Crossing association since 2007, also regularly attended the commemoration events.

== Remembrance pyramids ==
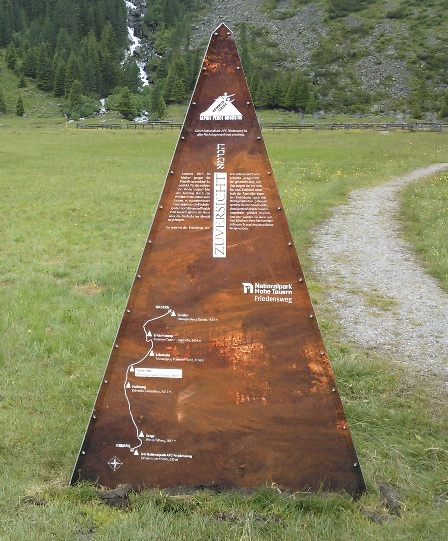
Remembrance pyramid.

To trace the escape route of the Jews, seven memorial pyramids were installed from 2013 in cooperation with the Hohe Tauern National Park along the route from Krimml over the Krimmler Tauern Pass to Kasern in the Ahrntal valley.

In 2021, an eighth memorial pyramid was also unveiled in Saalfelden in front of the former DP camp Givat Avoda. In addition, the Israeli artist Moshe Frumin, who had spent a year in the camp himself as a child, donated his design of a statue in the shape of a harp of David, which was unveiled in the same course.

On the first seven pyramids are descriptive texts with information about the escape in English, German and Italian, and on the eighth pyramid in Saalfelden in Hebrew instead of Italian.

== Alpendistel ==
Since 2020, the association has published its own magazine. Under the title Alpendistel. Magazin für antifaschistische Gedenkkultur (magazine for Anti-Fascist Memorial Culture), a print edition is published once a year with various text contributions on a current guiding theme, which also determines the focus of the annual memorial walk and dialogue forum.

Issues of Alpendistel:

| 25 June 2020 | "Im Schatten der Berge. Antisemitismus gestern und heute" |
| 15 April 2021 | "(K)eine Welt von gestern. Der herausfordernde Umgang mit Erinnerungen" |
| 15 April 2022 | "Kein ruhiges Hinterland. Widerstand in den Bergen" |

== Remembrance work ==
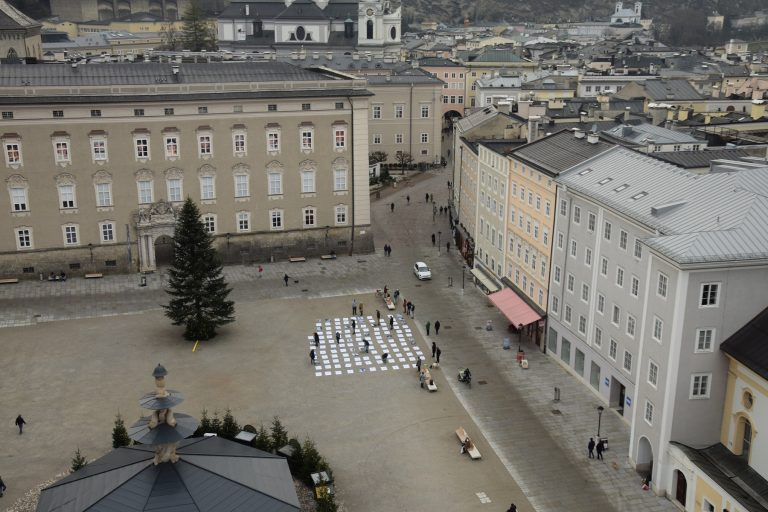
Memory in Salzburg, Austria.

Active remembrance work is also a central point in the work of the initiative.

In December 2020, for example, APC organised an action against Nazi-contaminated streets and squares in Salzburg. In the so-called "Memory against Forgetting", passers-by were invited to find out about streets and squares in the city that were still named after Nazis and to sort them in a memory game laid out on Residenzplatz. Since the beginning of 2021, an offensive street name has also been presented every week on the association's social media channels.

In particular, APC strongly criticises the honouring of the SS doctor Bodmann, who was also active in Auschwitz, at the cemetery of honour in Lend (Salzburg). The association demands an artistic and remembrance policy intervention, which could at least be implemented by putting up an explanatory plaque.

== Alpendistel On Air ==
Under the name "Alpendistel On Air. Gedenken – Erinnern – Handeln" the association broadcast a monthly program from the Radiofabrik for one year starting in October 2021. In the broadcast series, various aspects of commemoration and remembrance were taken up and illuminated – mainly in the context of conversations with changing interlocutors, but also in short reports on various commemorative projects in and outside Salzburg.

The selection of topics was based on content from the magazine Alpendistel.

== Grove of Flight ==
The Exodus Grove is a memorial site on the route of the memorial hike. It was installed in cooperation with the Hohe Tauern National Park on an alpine meadow in the Krimml Achen Valley to create a place of remembrance for all people who are still on the run today.

The trees planted on the grove are dedicated to those people whose fate is linked to the former Givat Avoda camp in Saalfelden, or to the Jewish exodus in 1947 across the Krimml Tauern. At the same time, the grove is also dedicated to all those who have shown exemplary commitment to the goals and development of APC. The Exodus Grove is a message of hope for all people who have to flee.

The inauguration of the grove took place on 17 October 2017, on the occasion of APC's 10th anniversary at the time, as part of a ceremony commemorating 70 years of the Jewish exodus in 1947.
