= Martha Kyrle =

Austrian physicist and philanthropist

Martha Kyrle (née Schärf; 17 April 1917 – 15 July 2017) was an Austrian physician and philanthropist.

== Biography ==
Kyrle was born in Vienna, 17 April 1917. She was the daughter of Adolf Schärf, the former federal president of Austria and his wife Hilda (22 April 1886 – 21 June 1956). As her mother died before her father was elected federal president, it was she who accompanied her father on state visits and other occasions. Although she was just the daughter of a head of state, she was the first Austrian First Lady who appeared as such in public. Due to her fashion sense and her youthful appearance she could compete with the glamour of Jackie Kennedy. She turned 100 in April 2017 and died on 15 July 2017, aged 100.
