= Margarete Jonas =

First Lady of Austria

First Lady of Austria
- In office 9 June 1965 – 24 April 1974
- President: Franz Jonas
- Preceded by: Hilda Schärf
- Succeeded by: Herma Kirchschläger

Personal details
- Born: Margarete Towarek; 13 June 1898 Vienna, Austria‑Hungary
- Died: 7 August 1976 (aged 78) Vienna, Austria
- Resting place: Presidential vault, Vienna Central Cemetery
- Spouse: Franz Jonas (died 1974)

Margarete "Grete" Jonas (née Towarek; 13 June 1898 – 7 August 1976) was an Austrian public figure who served as First Lady of Austria from 1965 to 1974 during the presidency of her husband, Franz Jonas. Fluent in German, English and Czech, she accompanied the president on numerous foreign trips, including the 1966 state visit to the United Kingdom - the first by an Austrian head of state.
