= Austria–Russia relations =

- Austria: Russia

Diplomatic mission
- Embassy of Austria, Moscow: Embassy of Russia, Vienna

Bilateral relations exist and existed between Austria and Russia and their predecessor states. Since October 1955, the Republic of Austria maintains the constitutionally-mandated status of neutrality; the country is a founding member of the Organisation for Economic Co-operation and Development (OECD). Austria joined the EU in 1995. Russia is a permanent member of the United Nations Security Council, a partner of ASEAN, a member of the Shanghai Cooperation Organisation (SCO), the G20, the Asia-Pacific Economic Cooperation (APEC), the Organization for Security and Co-operation in Europe (OSCE), as well as the leading member state of the Commonwealth of Independent States (CIS), the Collective Security Treaty Organization (CSTO), and the Eurasian Economic Union (EEU). Both countries are members of the Organization for Security and Co-operation in Europe and the World Trade Organization (WTO).

== History ==
=== Early history ===
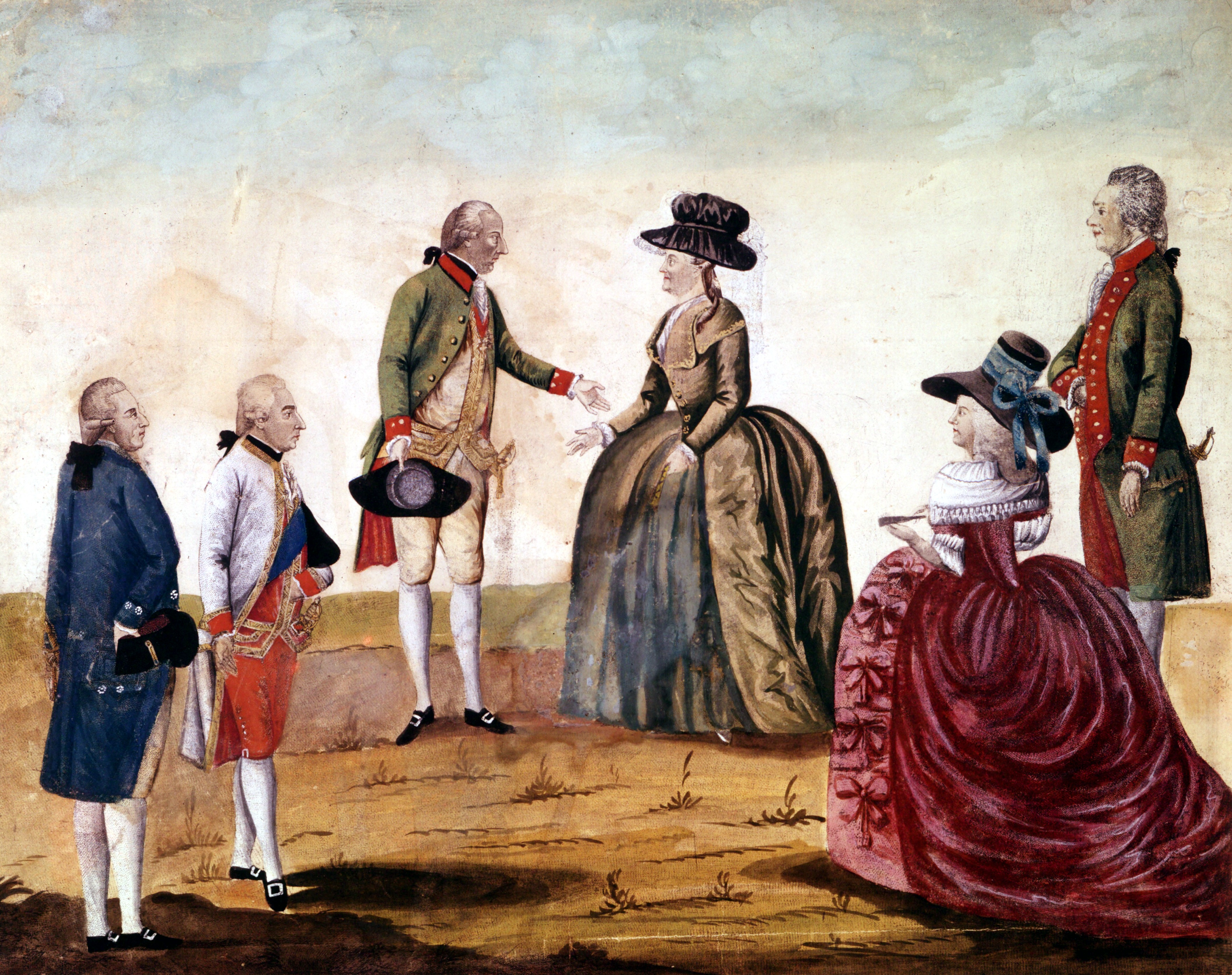
During the Crimean journey of Catherine the Great she met with the Austrian Emperor Joseph II, travelling incognito.

The lands now part of Austria were once simply a collection of fiefs of the House of Habsburg whose head was also the Holy Roman Emperor from the 15th Century on. The history of Austria in international relations during this time period was synonymous with the foreign policy of the Habsburgs. Russia was more or less uninterested in European affairs before Peter I (r. 1682–1725) but there were contacts between the Holy Roman Emperor and the Tsardom of Russia, the most known of all was the Embassy conducted by Sigismund von Herberstein in the 16th Century. Between these two vast monarchies lay the Polish–Lithuanian Commonwealth and the Ottoman Empire. However, as the Habsburgs expanded their domain (often shortened as "Austria" after its central province, the Archduchy of Austria) south and east and Russia south and west, relations between the two monarchies became vital to European security.

When Peter the Great was proclaimed emperor in 1721, his and his successors' recognition of the imperial title was delayed by the Habsburgs, the other claimant successors of the Roman Empire, until 1742, during the War of the Austrian Succession. Russia's entry into European affairs created a recurring alliance between Russia and Austria, often directed against the Ottomans and France. Russia and Austria were allies during the War of the Polish Succession (1733–1738), the War of the Austrian Succession (1740–1748), the Seven Years' War (1756–1763), and from 1787 to 1791. The monarchies both waged separates wars against the Ottomans (the Austro-Turkish War (1788-1791) and the Russo-Turkish War (1787–1792)). Both countries participated in the first and third Partitions of Poland.

The two countries did not border each other until the Second Partition of Poland. The coming of the French Revolution created ideological solidarity between the absolutist monarchies including Russia and Austria, which both fought against France during the French Revolutionary Wars and the Napoleonic Wars.

=== Austrian and Russian Empires ===
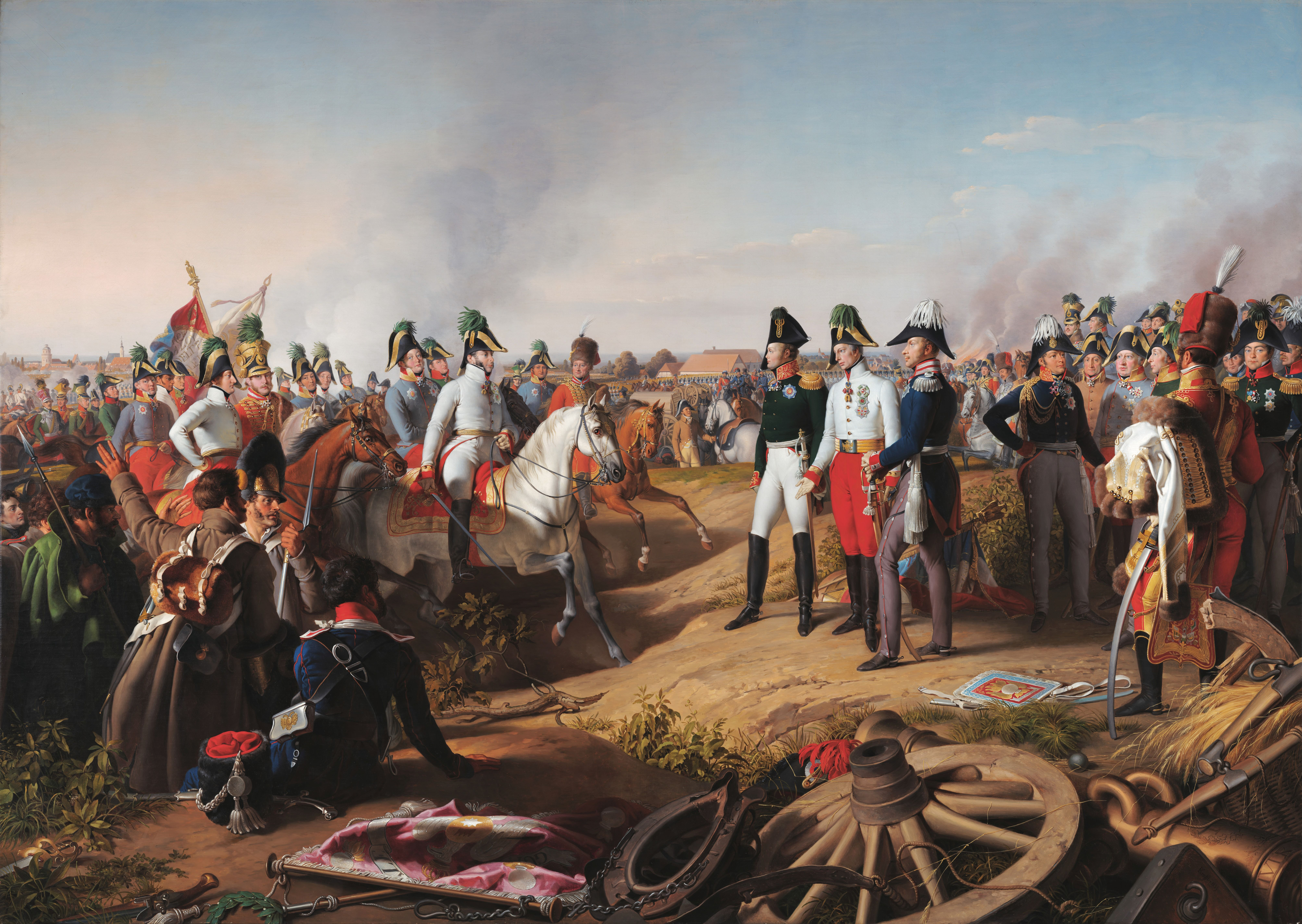
The Declaration of Victory After the Battle of Leipzig by Johann Peter Krafft. Alexander I of Russia, Francis I of Austria and Frederick William III of Prussia after the Battle of Leipzig in 1813

In 1804 Austria was proclaimed an Empire and after the Congress of Vienna the great reactionary powers of Europe pledged to work together to keep revolution at bay, and Austria and Russia were the greatest defenders of the Vienna settlement.

After 1815 Austria's policy as set by Klemens von Metternich was based on a realistic acceptance of Russia's political predominance in Moldavia and Wallachia. He obtained from Tsar Nicholas I some economic concessions during the 1830s. The two powers began to co-operate, with the mutual aim of preserving the status quo.

1833 Münchengrätz Convention held meeting was a pivotal moment in European diplomacy, where the Russian and Austrian empires agreed to cooperate in sustaining the Ottoman Empire against collapse. The treaty's first secret article explicitly stated that Russia and Austria would cooperate to prevent the "Pasha of Egypt" from any direct or indirect extension of authority over the Ottoman Empire's European provinces. The second secret article stipulated that, should the Ottoman Empire collapse, the two imperial courts would act in concert in all matters regarding the establishment of a new order. This agreement was a response to the recent events in Egypt and aimed to prevent further destabilization of the Ottoman Empire.

The Revolutions of 1848 shook the Habsburg lands, and the Hungarian lands declared their independence. Russia intervened by invading Hungary to suppress the revolutions and restore Habsburg sovereignty, under Prince Felix of Schwarzenberg.

During the Crimean War, Austria maintained a policy of hostile neutrality towards Russia, and, while not going to war, was supportive of the Anglo-French coalition. Count Buol’s policies were characterized by cautious diplomacy aimed at maintaining Austria’s strategic influence while avoiding direct military engagement in the Crimean War. He orchestrated the Austrian military occupation of the Danubian Principalities, while officially maintaining neutrality in the war, thereby preventing Austria from entering a conflict against Russia while simultaneously limiting Russian expansion in the Balkans. The Bruck-Buol dispute emerged during Austria’s handling of the Near Eastern crisis (1853–1855). While Bruck advocated bold, punitive measures to enhance Austrian prestige, emphasizing assertive influence over the Turks and territorial leverage in the Danubian Principalities, Buol favored careful negotiation and delayed confrontation with Russia. Bruck’s aggressive tactics occasionally embarrassed Austria internationally and were criticized as lacking a consistent diplomatic framework. This stance deeply angered Nicholas I of Russia and was a serious strain to Russo-Austrian relations thereafter. Although it was Russia that was punished by the Treaty of Paris, in the long run it was Austria that lost the most from the Crimean War despite having barely taken part in it. Having abandoned its alliance with Russia, Austria was diplomatically isolated following the war. Russia subsequently stood aside as Austria was evicted from the Italian and German states. That Russian neutrality towards its former ally clearly contributed to Austrian defeat in the 1866 Austro-Prussian War and its loss of influence in most German-speaking lands. The Habsburgs therefore gave in to Hungarian demands for autonomy and refounded their state as the Austro-Hungarian Empire.

France, after the Franco-Prussian War and the loss of Alsace-Lorraine, was fervently hostile to Germany, and made an alliance with Russia. The great Slavic empire competed with the newly renamed Austria-Hungary for an increased role in the Balkans at the expense of the Ottoman Empire, and the foundations were in place for creating the diplomatic alliances that would lead to World War I.

=== Austria-Hungary and Russian Empire ===
Austrian officials worried that Russia was adopting a pan-Slavist policy designed to unite all Slavonic-speaking peoples under the Tsar's leadership. This led them to pursue an anti-Slavic policy domestically and abroad. The major source of tension between Austria-Hungary and Russia was the so-called Eastern Question: what to do about the weakening Ottoman Empire and its rebellious Christian subjects.

From 1873 to 1887, at least nominally, Austria-Hungary and Russia were again allies with the German Empire in the League of Three Emperors. The 1878 Treaty of Berlin concluded in the aftermath of Russia's victory against the Ottoman Empire in the Russo-Turkish War (1877–1878), allowed Austria-Hungary to occupy the Bosnia Vilayet. The Reichstadt Agreement was a secret verbal pact between Austria-Hungary and Russia in July 1876, Present were the foreign ministers, Prince Alexander Gorchakov and Count Gyula Andrássy, that outlined non-intervention while also establishing a preliminary division of influence in case of war with the Ottoman Empire and the division of influence in the region, setting the stage for future policy in the Congress of Berlin.

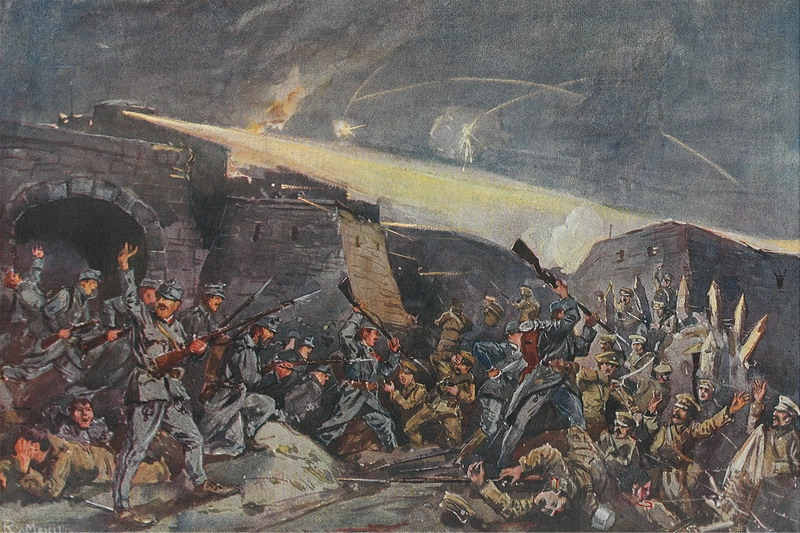
Siege of Przemyśl in 1915

The visit to Saint Petersburg of Austrian Emperor Franz Joseph and his conference with Nicholas II of Russia in 1897 heralded a secret agreement between the two empires to honor and seek to maintain the status quo in the Balkans, which was in line with Vienna's attempts to forestall an emergence of a large Slavic state in the region. In 1903 the pro-Austrian King Alexander I of Serbia was assassinated in a coup. The new King Peter I of Serbia was pro-Russian and relations between Serbia and Austria-Hungary and therefore also with Russia, deteriorated.

The Vienna Program also involved the appointment of one Russian and one Austro-Hungarian civil agent to oversee the reform of the administration, judiciary, and local gendarmerie in the Macedonian vilayets. Each Great Power appointed an advisory official to the Ottoman official in charge of reforming the gendarmerie in each province. This agreement represented an innovative approach in the policy of the great powers based on emerging concepts such as negotiation, collective action, and dialogue in a recognized international mandate.

Austria-Hungary's formal annexation of the Bosnia Vilayet in 1908 dismayed Russia as well as all the other Great Powers and Austria-Hungary's Balkan neighbours, who viewed the action as a violation of the Treaty of Berlin. While Russia eventually backed down, relations between the two empires were permanently damaged. The lasting result was bitter enmity between Austria-Hungary on one side and Serbia and Russia on the other.

Following the assassination of Archduke Franz Ferdinand of Austria by Serb nationalists of the Black Hand secret society on 28 June 1914, Austria delivered the July Ultimatum to Serbia demanding the right for Austrian police and military to enter Serbia. Serbia rejected the ultimatum and on 28 July 1914, Austria-Hungary declared war on Serbia. On August 6, the Emperor Franz Joseph signed the Austro-Hungarian declaration of war on Russia, who had since 1 August been at war with Germany, the ally of Austria-Hungary. Russia and Austria-Hungary would fight to the point of exhaustion on the bloody Eastern Front. The war ended with the overthrow of monarchy in both countries, as well as in Germany, and the dissolution of their empires.

Archduke Ferdinand’s primary foreign-policy objective was to foster rapprochement with Tsarist Russia. Both Austria-Hungary and Russia shared a strategic interest in containing radical nationalism in Southeast Europe, as both empires faced threats from movements aiming to dismantle their multiethnic monarchies. He posited that cooperation between Vienna and St. Petersburg could prevent Balkan crises from escalating into major-power conflicts as many historians argue that his survival might have slowed or altered the path toward the First World War. Despite long-standing historical tensions, he viewed Russia as a potential partner in maintaining regional stability rather than as a geopolitical rival.

=== Austria and the Soviet Union ===
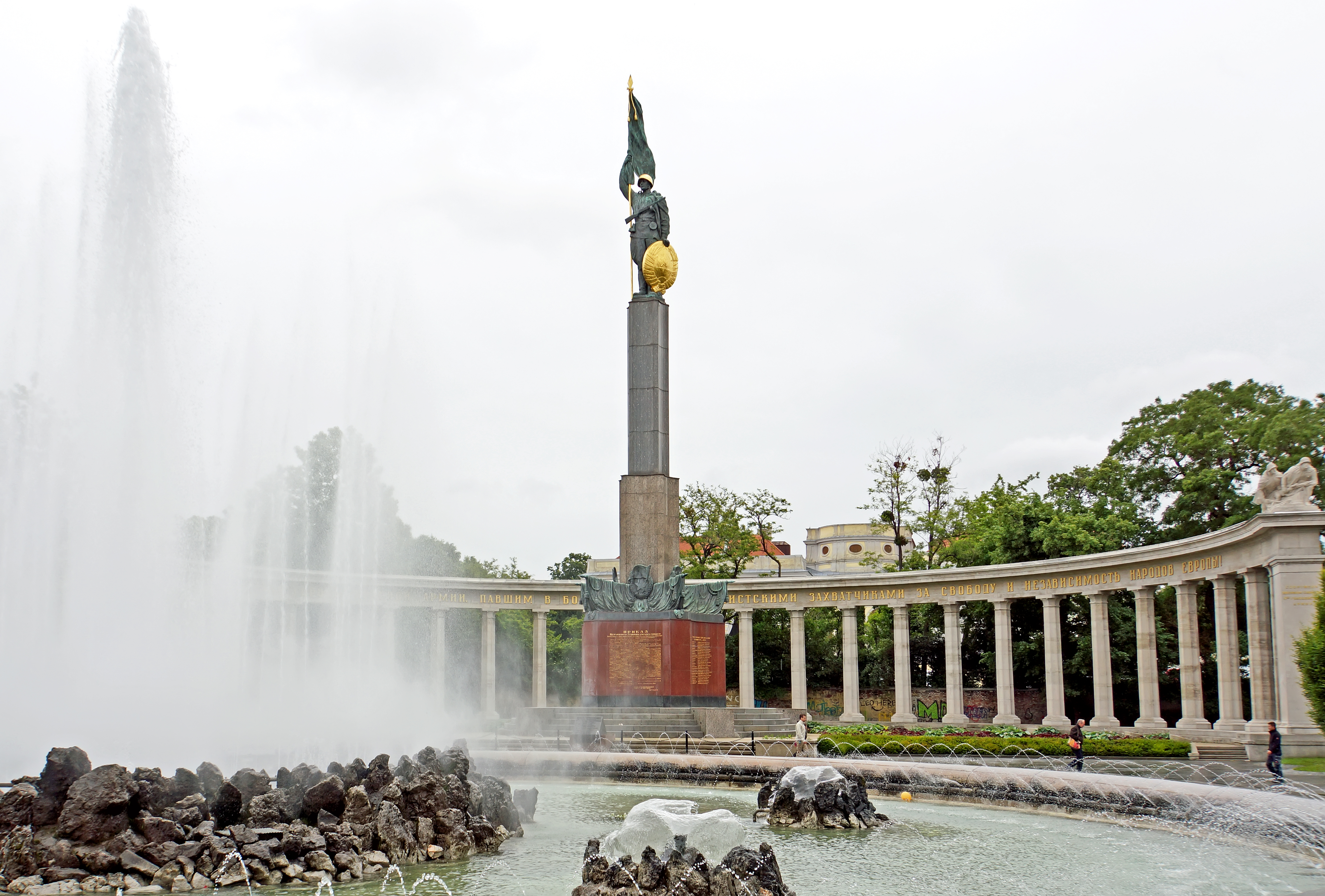
Soviet War Memorial in Vienna

Following the Bolshevik revolution in November 1917, the new Russian government began diplomatic efforts to terminate the war with the Central Powers, including Austria-Hungary. These efforts led to the conclusion of the Treaty of Brest-Litovsk on March 3, 1918. Diplomatic relations between Austria and the Soviet Union were established on February 21, 1924 and the former Russian Imperial embassy′s building was handed over to the Soviets.

The rump Austrian state left after the war eventually joined with Nazi Germany in the Anschluss, and was therefore part of the German invasion of the Soviet Union.

After the war Austria was occupied by the allied armies, separated from Germany, and divided into four zones of occupation. The Soviets did not create a separate socialist government in their zone as they did in East Germany. Instead, Austria was required to sign the Austrian State Treaty of 1955 under which it pledged total neutrality in the Cold War confrontation between the Soviet Union and the U.S.-led West. The treaty also mandates that Austria never seek to unify with other German-speaking nations, and perpetual maintenance of the Soviet War Memorial in Vienna.

In 1968, Austria became the first Western European country to begin imports of natural gas from the Soviet Union. Subsequently, Europe's main gas hub was set up at Baumgarten an der March on Austria's eastern border with Czechoslovakia, now Slovakia.

=== Republic of Austria and Russian Federation (since 1991) ===
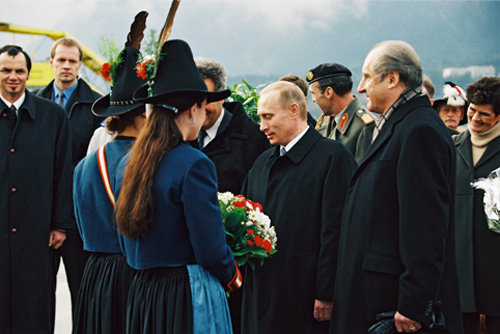
Russian President Vladimir Putin with Austrian President Thomas Klestil in Innsbruck, Austria in February 2001

Following the dissolution of the USSR in 1991, the Russian Federation, the successor state to the Soviet Union, went on maintaining a close relationship with Austria.

According to the report Gazprom's European Web, Austria has long been a favorite country for Soviet (now Russian) commerce, banking, and espionage activities. Austrian police sources have in the 2000s stated that the Russian Foreign Intelligence Service (SVR) maintained its largest European station in Vienna.

In 2003, SVR agent Vladimir Alganov was caught in Vienna discussing bribes Russian spies had paid to senior Polish officials.

The former bodyguard of Chechen President Ramzan Kadyrov and prominent critic of the Chechen government, Umar Israilov, who had filed a complaint with the European Court of Human Rights and was about to tell his story to The New York Times, was assassinated in a street of Vienna in January 2009. Oleg Orlov, the director of Moscow's Memorial Human Rights Centre, said "We are deeply alarmed about what appears to be another politically motivated killing of a critic of high-level Russian government officials. [...] In light of the brutal retaliation inflicted on those who speak out on abuses in Chechnya, Israilov's actions were particularly courageous, and his killers and those behind them need to be promptly held to account". Related to the case might be murders of human rights lawyer Stanislav Markelov and journalist Anastasia Baburova - both were interested in Israilov's case.

Thanks to its neutral status, Austria continued to be the venue for spy exchanges as was the case in 2010, when the U.S. and Russia swapped four imprisoned U.S. and UK intelligence assets, who had been convicted in Russia, for 10 Russian agents caught and convicted in the U.S., on the tarmac of Vienna International Airport.

Austria has sought to maintain good relations and close economic cooperation with Russia even after the drastic deterioration of Russia's relationship with the West following the 2014 Ukraine crisis. In December 2016, the FPÖ leader, Heinz-Christian Strache, announced that his party had signed what he called a cooperation agreement with United Russia, Russian president Vladimir Putin’s party. Following the national election in October 2017, the FPÖ entered government as a junior partner of the winner ÖVP headed by Sebastian Kurz. In June 2018, in Vienna at a joint press conference, the Chancellor of Austria Sebastian Kurz stated that he hoped for a gradual rapprochement between the European Union and Russia. However, he mentioned that Austria supports the decisions of Brussels on sanctions against Russia.

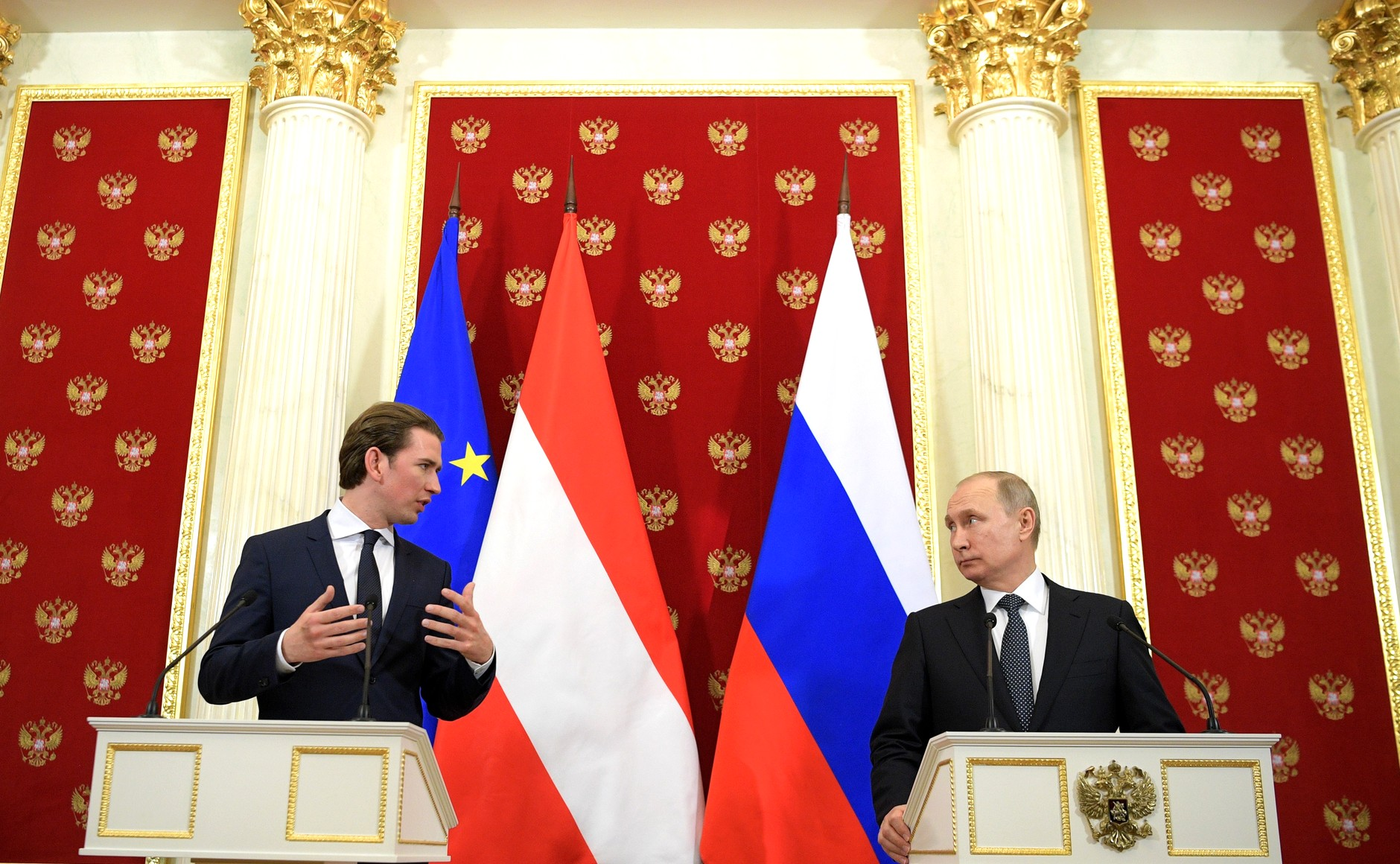
Russian President Putin and Austrian Chancellor Sebastian Kurz in Moscow in February 2018

Austria was the only major EU country not to expel Russian diplomats in the course of the retaliatory measures undertaken by the West in the aftermath of the poisoning case in Salisbury in March 2018.

Austria was the first foreign country that Russian president Vladimir Putin visited officially in June 2018 following his reelection for the fourth term as president of Russia. In the course of Putin's visit, the CEOs of OMV and Gazprom signed an agreement to extend Russian gas supplies to Austria until 2040, with both Putin and Austrian Chancellor Sebastian Kurz in attendance. The signing occurred at a time when the two countries were marking 50 years of Soviet/Russian gas supplies to Austria.

On 9 November 2018, Austrian Chancellor Sebastian Kurz said that a 70-year-old retired army colonel was believed to have spied for Russia for about thirty years. The officer in question, who was exposed thanks to a tip-off from the UK government, was said to have been engaged in disclosing state secrets to Russia's GRU from 1992 until September 2018. Two days later, Kronen Zeitung reported that for more than a year, Austria's State Prosecution Office Against White Collar Crime and Corruption (Korruptionsstaatsanwaltschaft) had been investigating an employee of the Office for the Protection of the Constitution and Counterterrorism (BVT) who was suspected of spying for Russia. As a result, Austrian foreign minister Karin Kneissl cancelled her visit to Russia that had been slated for early December. Nevertheless, Chancellor Kurz, citing Austria's neutrality, said no "unilateral action" would be taken against Russia. Professor Gerhard Mangott of University of Innsbruck commented for the BBC by saying he was surprised the incident had been made public as it is business as usual and a long-standing tradition for Austrian citizens to spy for foreign powers. In early July 2019, an Austrian court extended pre-trial detention of the suspected retired army colonel until 26 August. On 25 July 2019, Austria's Ministry of the Interior said that the suspected colonel's handler had been a Moscow-born GRU officer Igor Egorovich Zaytsev, a Russian national, for whom an international arrest warrant had been issued. In June 2020, the colonel, still unnamed, was freed upon being convicted of spying for GRU for more than 25 years.

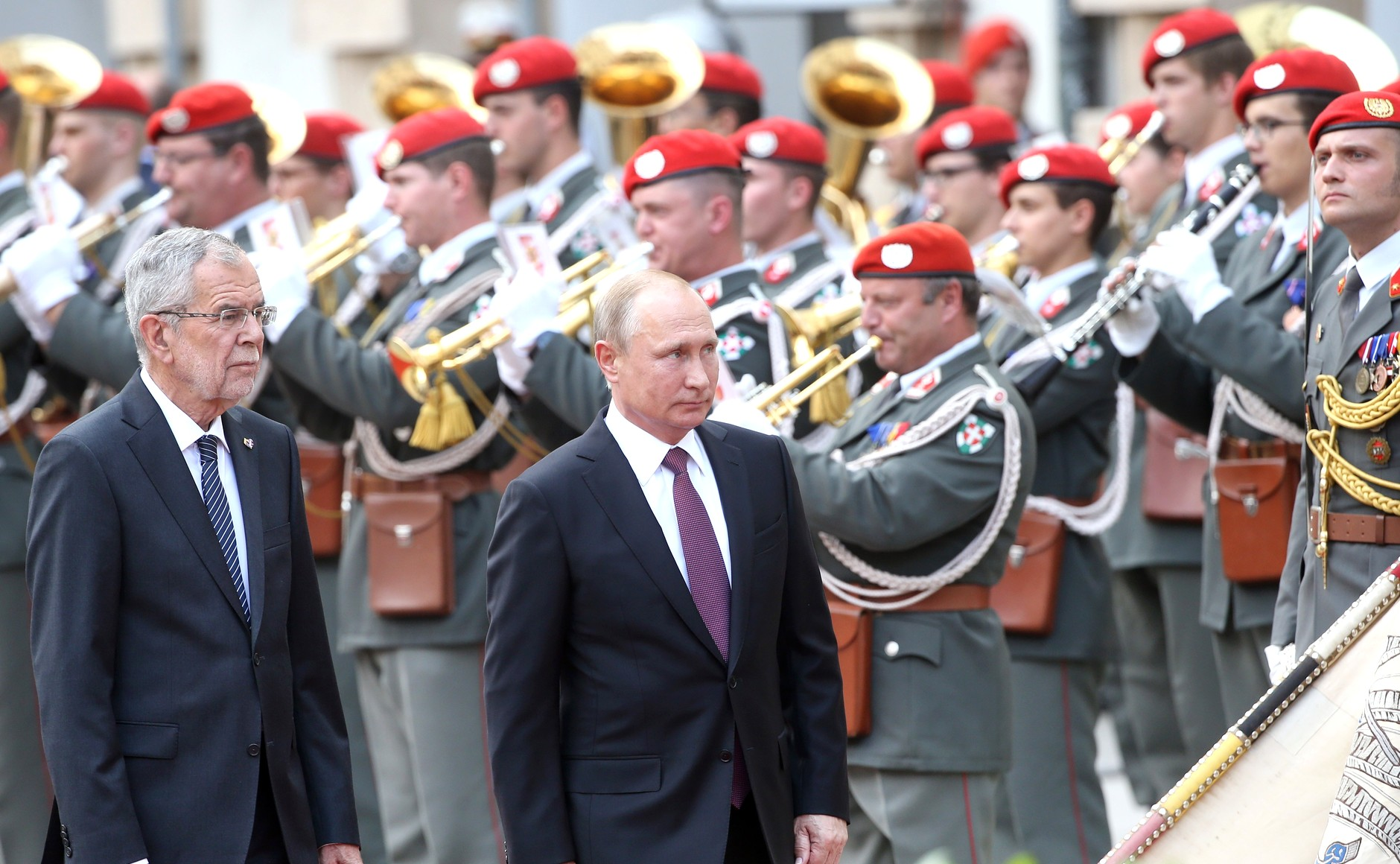
Vladimir Putin and Austrian President Alexander Van der Bellen in Vienna in June 2018

In May 2019, Vladimir Putin and Alexander Van der Bellen, the President of Austria, on an official visit to Russia, addressed the constituent meeting of the Sochi Dialogue Civil Society Forum. Following the talks with his Russian counterpart, Alexander Van der Bellen told the press conference that Austria had no intention to quit the Nord Stream 2 project, the mounting U.S. sanctions notwithstanding.

In August 2020, Austria expelled a Russian diplomat following a report accusing him of being involved in industrial espionage. The expulsion was said to be a first in Austria's relations with Russia. The Austrian newspaper Kronen Zeitung reported that the diplomat's illicit activities were exposed after an Austrian who worked in a technology company confessed he had carried out espionage for years on behalf of the Russian, who was his intelligence handler.

In February and March 2022, during the 2022 Russian invasion of Ukraine, Austria supported EU sanctions against Russia, despite still being a militarily neutral country. On 7 March 2022, Putin put Austria on the list of "enemy countries" along with all other countries who supported sanctions against Russia. Austria joined other countries in spring 2022 in declaring a number of Russian diplomats Persona non grata.

On 11 April 2022, Austrian Chancellor Nehammer was the first European leader to visit Vladimir Putin since the invasion to discuss an end of the war.

Also in April 2022, Austria expelled four Russian diplomats for behaviour incompatible with their diplomatic status – a reason often invoked in spying cases –, joining a group of European Union countries that took similar action the same week; unlike those other EU countries, Austria's government did not say the move was because of Russia's invasion of Ukraine. In February 2023, Austria expelled another four Russian diplomats for behaving in a manner inconsistent with international agreements; this brought to nine the number of Russian diplomats Austria has expelled since 2020.

Whilst Austria has publicly criticised the Russian actions in Ukraine, commercial ties in 2023, between the two countries, remain fairly intact, especially in the energy and finance sectors, with two thirds of Austrian companies operating in Russia, such as Raiffeisenbank (Russia) and Red Bull, planning on staying there and OMV continuing to import gas from Russia.

== Trade ==
In 2021 Russia exported $631m of goods to Austria with crude oil being the main item. Austria exported $2.28 billion of goods with medical products being the top item. Between 1995 and 2021 Russian exports have risen by an average of 1.57% p.a. with Austrian exports rising at 4.07% p.a. on average.

In 2023 the import value sank by 50.4% and the export value fell by 29.4%. Compared to 2023 the import value dropped by 40.7% and export value fell by 23.5%.

== Education ==
The Russian Embassy School in Vienna serves Russian children living in the city.

== Resident diplomatic missions ==
- Austria has an embassy in Moscow.
- Russia has an embassy in Vienna and a consulate-general in Salzburg.
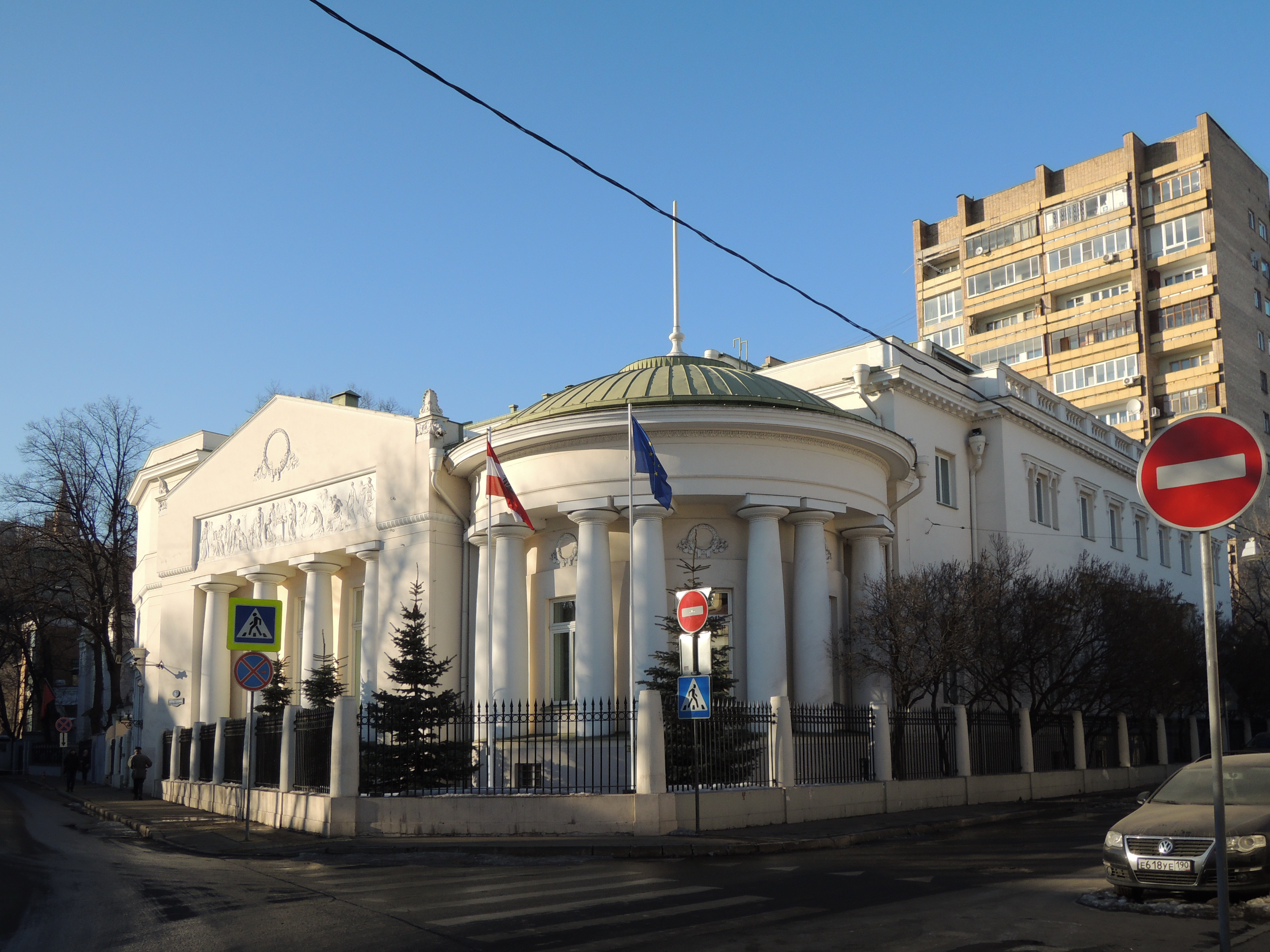
Embassy of Austria in Moscow

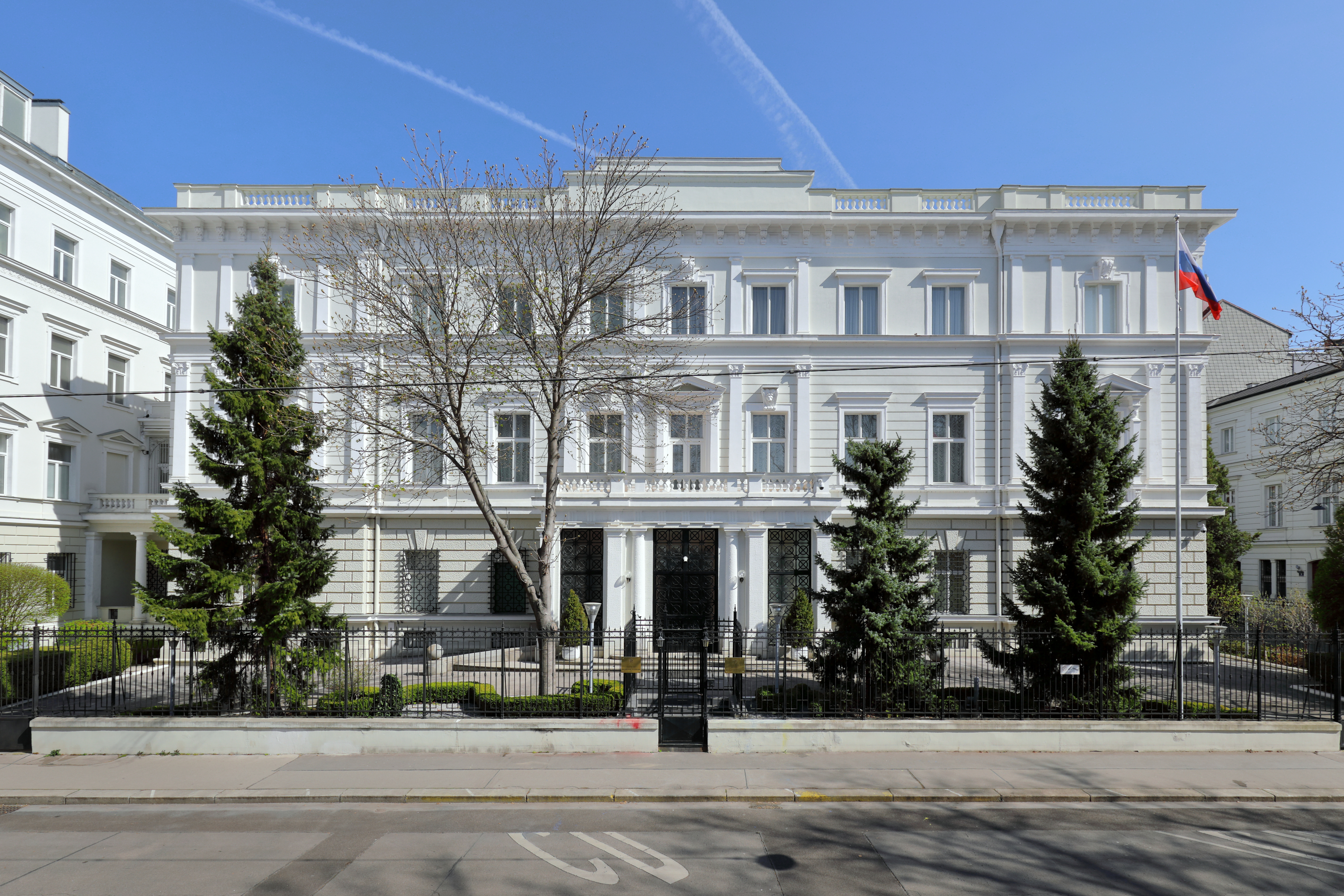
Embassy of Russia in Vienna

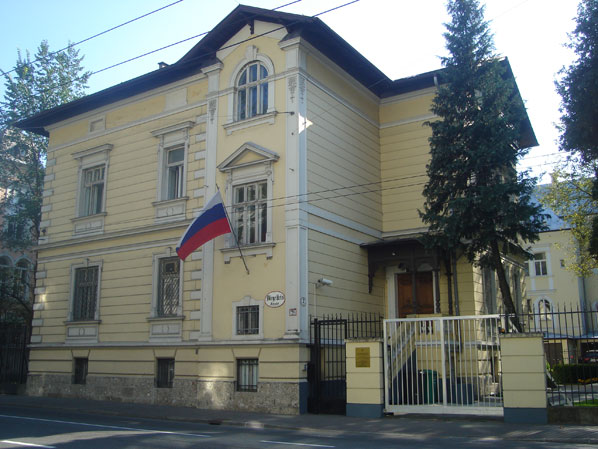
Consulate-General of Russia in Salzburg

== See also ==
- Austria and Russian intelligence
- Foreign relations of Austria
- Foreign relations of Russia
- Embassy of Austria, Moscow
- Embassy of Russia, Vienna
- Ambassadors of Russia to Austria
- Russians in Austria
- Austria–NATO relations
- Austria–Soviet Union relations
- Internationalization of the Danube River
- Austria–Ukraine relations

== Sources ==
- Enciklopedija Jugoslavije (1968). Enciklopedija Jugoslavije, Vol. 7 // Sovjetsko-jugoslovenski odnosi (in Serbo-Croatian). Zagreb, Socialist Federal Republic of Yugoslavia: Jugoslovenski leksikografski zavod.
