= Doris Schmidauer =

Austrian environmentalist and politician

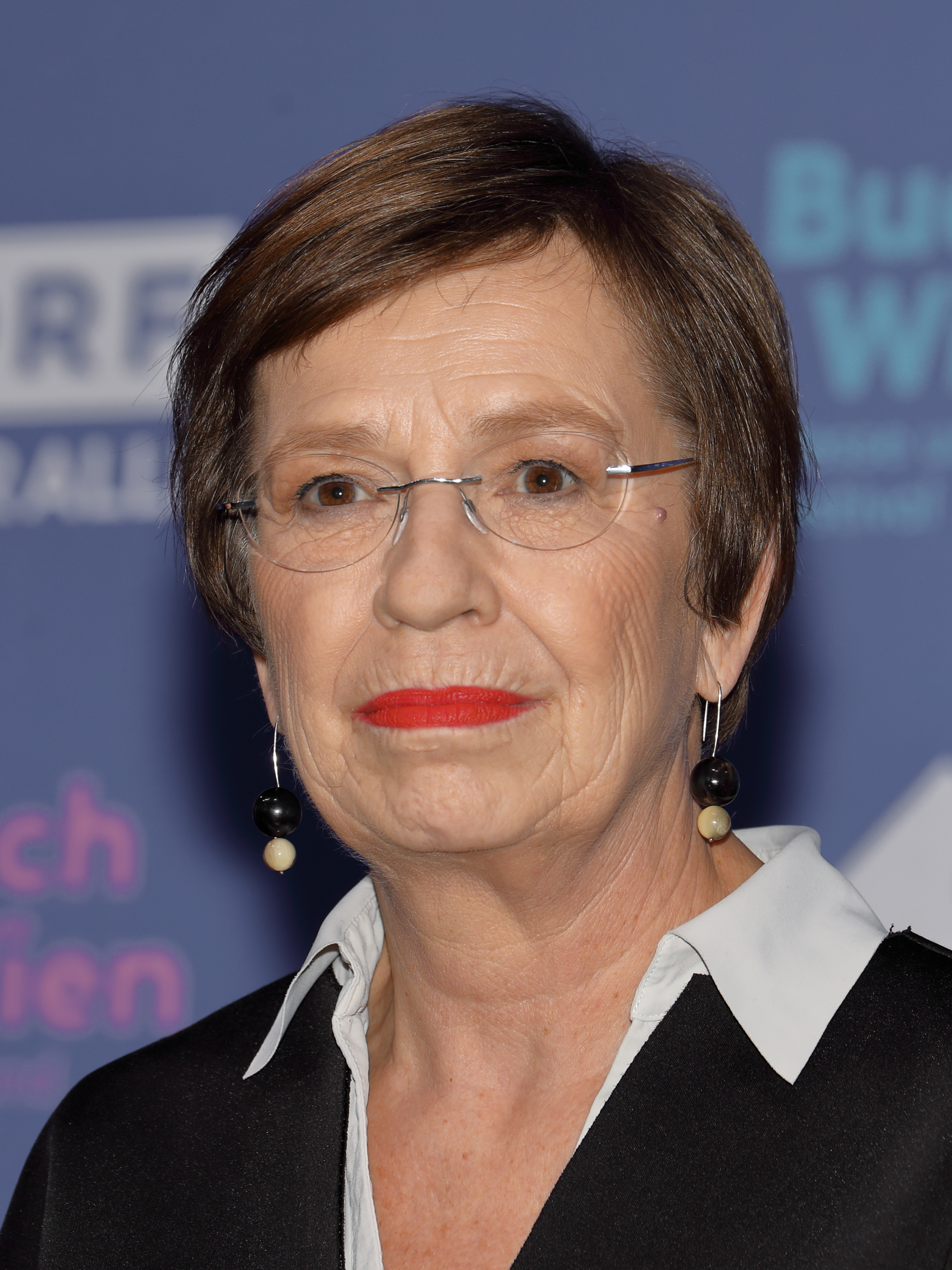
- Schmidauer in November 2025

First Lady of Austria
- Current
- Assumed role 26 January 2017
- President: Alexander Van der Bellen
- Preceded by: Margit Fischer

Personal details
- Born: 21 September 1963 (age 63) Grieskirchen, Upper Austria, Austria
- Party: Green Party
- Spouse: Alexander Van der Bellen (m. 2015)
- Education: University of Vienna

Doris Schmidauer (born 21 September 1963) is an Austrian environmentalist and party official for the Green Party. Schmidauer has served as the First Lady of Austria since January 2017 as the wife of Austrian President Alexander Van der Bellen.

== Biography ==
Doris Schmidauer was born in Grieskirchen, Upper Austria, on 21 September 1963, to Doris and Ernst Schmidauer. Her father, Ernst Schmidauer (1934–2018), was a school director at Johann Eisterer State School and a brass band conductor. Schmidauer was raised in Peuerbach, a small town in Grieskirchen District. She attended primary school in Peuerbach and graduated from a girls' high school in the city of Wels in June 1982.

Schmidauer moved to Vienna, where she graduated with a degree in political science from the University of Vienna in 1988. Her thesis dealt with the history of the Österreichischen Nitrogenwerke AG. As a student, Schmidauer participated in the 1984 Occupation of the Hainburger Au, to help preserve a large flood plain and wetlands area near Vienna. She credits the campaign to save the Hainburger Au as the beginning of her work in ecology and environmentalism. The Hainburger Au was saved from development and became part of the Danube-Auen National Park in 1996.

Schmidauer, who described her political views as "left-liberal," has worked for the Austrian Green Party for nearly 30 years. She began working for the Green Party as a new hire in December 1989. Schmidauer worked as the personal assistant and political aide to Alexander Van der Bellen, a prominent Green Party politician (and her future husband) from 1996 until 1999. She then served as the Managing Director of the Green Party Parliamentary Club from October 1999 until January 2018.

In December 2015, Doris Schmidauer married Alexander Van der Bellen following a longtime relationship. Doris Schmidauer has no children, while Van der Bellen has two sons from his first marriage.

Schmidauer became First Lady in January 2017 when Van der Bellen assumed the presidency of Austria. She expressed a desire to continue working within the Green Party's leadership while fulfilling her obligations as first lady and wife of the president. She left her position as manager of the Greens Parliamentary Club in January 2018 to focus on the duties of the first lady. In a speech on International Women's Day 2019, Schmidauer criticized the lack of women on the boards of directors of domestic Austrian companies. She noted that, out 186 total board members, only nine were women.

== Honours ==
=== Foreign honours ===
- Estonia: 1st Class of the Order of the Cross of Terra Mariana (21 May 2021)
- Germany: Grand Cross, 1st class of the Order of Merit of the Federal Republic of Germany (21 October 2025)
- Italy: Knight Grand Cross of the Order of Merit of the Italian Republic (27 June 2019)
- Netherlands: Dame Grand Cross of the Order of the Crown (27 June 2022)
- Portugal: Grand Cross of the Order of Merit (18 June 2019)
- South Korea: Grand Gwanghwa Medal of the Order of Diplomatic Service Merit (14 June 2021)

Honorary titles
Preceded by Margit Fischer	First Lady of Austria; 2017–present	Incumbent
