= Luise Renner =

Wife and Former First Lady of Austrian President Karl Renner

Luise Renner (née Stoisits; 25 June 1872 – 30 June 1963) was the wife of Karl Renner, the former President of Austria. She was the first First Lady of the Second Austrian Republic.

Luise Stoisits was born in St. Nikolaus, a small village near Güssing. At 16 years old, she moved to Vienna, where she lived with relatives and worked at an inn. She met Karl Renner in 1890, while he was completing his military service, and their daughter Leopoldine was born a year later. They married in 1897. Karl Renner was elected the first President of the Second Austrian Republic in December 1945, making Luise the First Lady of Austria. They remained in those positions until Karl's death on 31 December 1950. Luise Renner was also a political activist and socialist in her own right: after the establishment of the welfare charity Volkshilfe Österreich in 1947, she was elected its inaugural president.
