= Nikita Lazarev =

Russian architect

Nikita Gerasimovich Lazarev
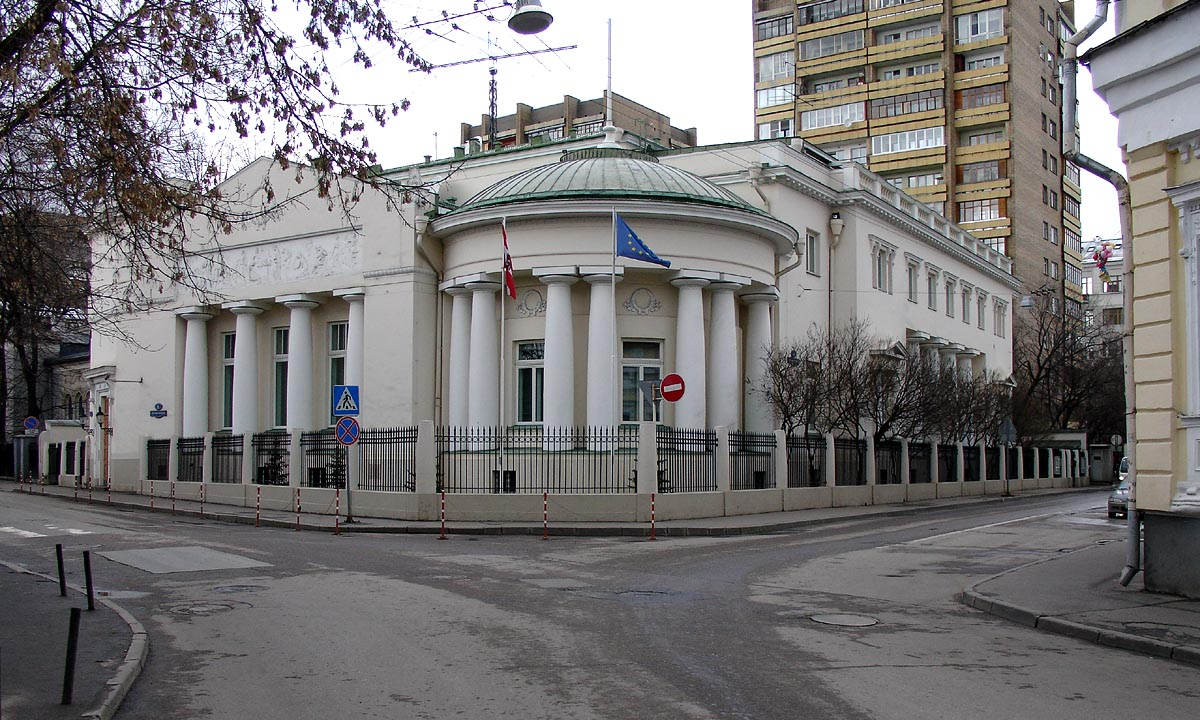
- Mindovsky House (Embassy of Austria), 1906
- Born: 1866; Moscow
- Died: 1932 (aged 65–66); Moscow
- Occupation: Architect
- Practice: own practice
- Buildings: Mindovsky House
- Projects: Arbat and Prechistenka apartment buildings

Nikita Gerasimovich Lazarev (Russian: Никита Герасимович Лазарев; 1866–1932) was a Russian civil engineer, contractor, real estate developer and Neoclassical architect, notable for his 1906 Mindovsky House in Khamovniki District of Moscow (now Embassy of Austria). According to Igor Grabar, Lazarev "led Arbat and Prechistenka neighborhoods into the new century" - his 1900s buildings concentrated in these upper-class areas.

== Biography ==
=== Lazarev practice ===
Nikita Lazarev was born into an old wealthy family of Armenian descent; his ancestor, Ovakim Lazarev, founded the historical Lazarev Institute of Oriental Languages (its building currently houses Embassy of Armenia) according to the will of his brother Ivan Lazarevich Lazarev. Nikita graduated from the Institute of Civil Engineers and operated as a partner in Lazarev and Strotter construction company.

Buildings of his own design prior to 1906 were typical Moscow Moderne version of Art Nouveau - never reaching the level of Lev Kekushev or Fyodor Schechtel. However, his turn to Neoclassicism produced a landmark, Mindovsky House.

=== Mindovsky House ===
Mindovsky family originated in Kineshma, where serf Ivan Ivanovich Mindovsky (1781–1853) launched his own textile mill. His grandson, Ivan Alexandrovich, commissioned the first historical Mindovsky House to Lev Kekushev (44, Povarskaya Street). Next of kin, Nikolay Ivanovich, commissioned the second Mindovsky House to Nikita Lazarev. Various members of the clan also owned apartment blocks in the city (including 9, Vspolny Lane by Fyodor Schechtel). Lazarev's Mindovsky House became a statement of neoclassical reaction against "decadent art". It stands next to two William Walcot's Art Nouveau mansions, on a strategic corner lot visible from Prechictenka Street.

In 1927-1938 the building housed Embassy of Austria. After the Anschluss of 1938, it was used as an exclusive hotel, housing guests like Joachim von Ribbentrop (August 1939) and Winston Churchill (October 1944). However, the rumour that Molotov–Ribbentrop Pact was signed there is an urban legend . In April, 1955 the building became Austrian Embassy again. Mindovsky House is also known as the site of a fictional shooting in Doctor Zhivago by Boris Pasternak.

=== Private life ===
Nikita Lazarev's niece was married to Ivan Zholtovsky, however, two architects didn't get along too well (Belyutin). Lazarev, a member of an old a prolific family, was also related to Wassily Kandinsky and other artists. A sportsman and driving enthusiast, he was the active member of upper-class Moscow Automobile Society before 1917. He was also a member of Valery Bryusov's Literary Arts Circle (as well as Fyodor Schechtel). Lazarev's life after 1917 is scarcely documented; he remained in Soviet Moscow, lost his practice but retained a decent standard of living (Belyutin).

His son, professor Viktor Nikitich Lazarev, was a prominent historian of Byzantium. He was admitted to the Soviet Academy of Sciences together with Igor Grabar, a long-time friend of Lazarevs; neither Lazarev, nor Grabar ever were in the Communist Party.

== Selected buildings ==
- 1902-1903 - Yechkin Hotel, 23 Arbat Street
- 1904 - 7, Volkhonka Street
- 1904-1906 - Tolstoy Hotel, 29 Arbat Street
- 1905-1906 - 43 Bolshaya Ordynka
- 1906 - Mindovsky House, 6 Prechistensky Lane
- 1906 - 10, Tverskoy Boulevard
- 1910 - 8, Tverskoy Boulevard
- 1911 - 68, Bolshaya Ordynka Street
- 1911-1912 17, Vspolny Lane
