= Margit Fischer =

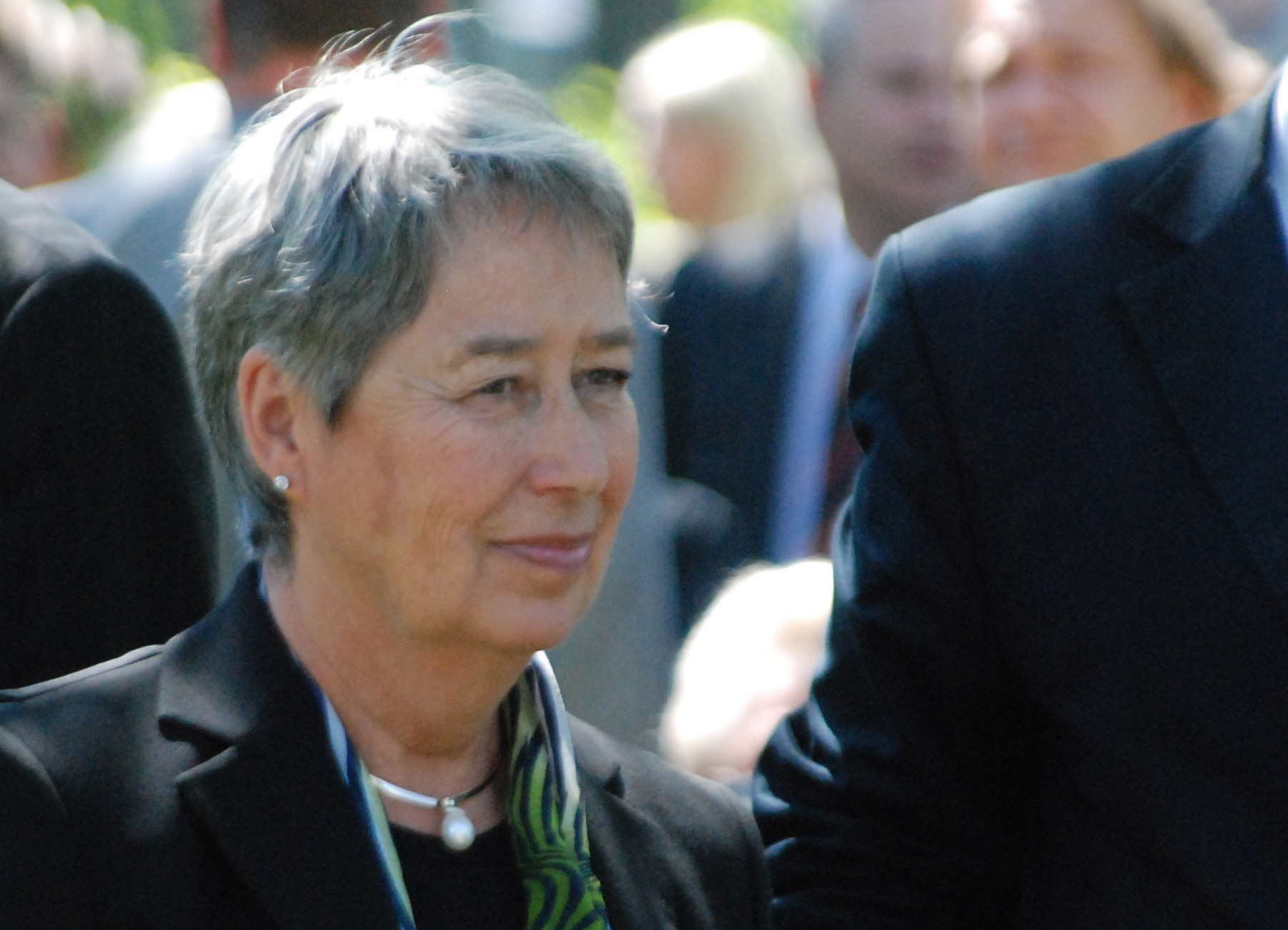
- Fischer in 2012

First Lady of Austria
- In office 9 July 2004 – 8 July 2016
- President: Heinz Fischer
- Preceded by: Margot Klestil-Löffler
- Succeeded by: Doris Schmidauer

Personal details
- Born: Margit Binder; 28 June 1943 (age 82) Stockholm, Sweden
- Spouse: Heinz Fischer (m. 1968)
- Children: 2

Margit Fischer (née Binder; born 28 June 1943) is an Austrian former fabric designer and First Lady of Austria from 2006 until 2016 as the wife of former president Heinz Fischer.

== Biography ==
Fischer was born in Stockholm, Sweden. Her parents, Otto and Anna Binder, were social democrats and Jews who fled to Sweden during the Nazi regime. Mrs Fischer speaks Swedish fluently. In 1949, her family returned to Austria. She attended grammar school in Vienna and began studying arts at the University of Vienna. In 1968, she married Heinz Fischer, a social democratic politician. In 2004, her husband was elected Austrian president and she became the First Lady of Austria. The couple have two children: Philip (born 1972) and Lisa (born 1975).

== Functions in Austria ==
- Former Vice-President of Rettet das Kind Österreich (Save the Children Austria) (1992-1998)
- Former President of Verein zur Gründung und zum Betrieb einer Erlebnisausstellung zu den Naturwissenschaften (Association for the creation and operation of an interactive exhibition about the natural sciences) (1993-2000)
- Chairperson of Österreichischer Frauenrat (Austrian Women's Council) (since 1995)
- Chairperson of Science Center Netzwerk (Science Center Network Society) (since 2005)

== Awards ==
- 2006 - SMOM — Grand Cross of Merit Order pro merito Melitensi of the Sovereign Military Order of Malta
- 2007 - Italy - Knight Grand Cross of the Order of Merit of the Italian Republic
- 2007 - Sweden — Commander Grand Cross of the Order of the Polar Star
- 2009 - Portugal — Grand Cross of the Order of Saint James of the Sword
- 2013 - Luxembourg — Grand Cross of the Order of Adolphe of Nassau
