= Russian Embassy School in Vienna =

Russian Embassy School in Austria
- Школа при Посольстве России в Австрии
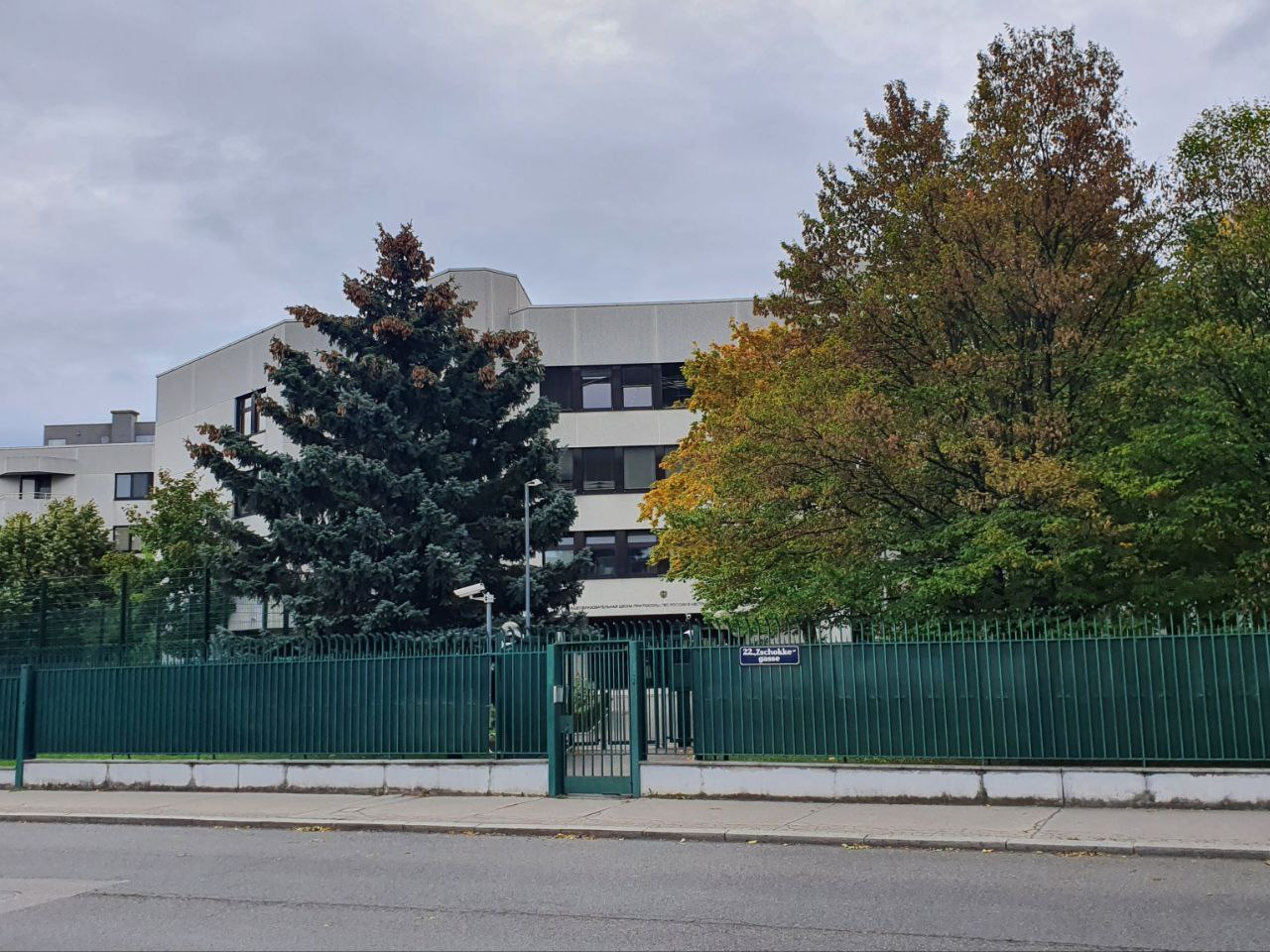

Location
- Erzherzog-Karl-Strasse, 182; Vienna, A-1220; Austria; 48.222610°N 16.468012°E

Information
- Former name: Secondary school under the Embassy of the USSR in Austria
- Opened: 1954
- Language: Russian
- Newspaper: На школьной волне
- Website: https://austria.mid.ru/de/botschaft/schule/

Russian Embassy School in Vienna (official full name: Secondary school with extended foreign language teaching under the Embassy of Russia in Austria, Russian: Средняя общеобразовательная школа с углубленным изучением иностранного языка при Посольстве России в Австрии) is a Russian international school in Vienna, Austria. It is a part of the Embassy of Russia in Vienna.

The school was established in 1953 as a primary school at the Embassy of the USSR for the children of the Soviet personnel in what was then Allied-occupied Austria. In 1975, the school was transformed into an eight-year school with German language teaching starting from the second grade. In the 1980s, the school moved to its present building located in the Russian diplomatic compound in the 22nd district of Vienna.

During Soviet times, the school had a local branch of the Soviet Pioneer organization which was named after general Dmitry Karbyshev, a Soviet prisoner of World War II murdered by the Nazis in the Mauthausen-Gusen concentration camp complex.

After the dissolution of the Soviet Union, the school was transferred to the Ministry of Foreign Affairs of the Russian Federation, along with other former Soviet property abroad. It is now located at the residential complex of the permanent mission of Russia to the International Organizations in Vienna.

As of 2016 it had 300 students and 32 teachers. It teaches up to the secondary level and is operated by the Russian Ministry of Foreign Affairs.

== See also ==
- Russians in Austria
- Austria–Russia relations
