= Herma Kirchschläger =

Herma Kirchschläger GCIH
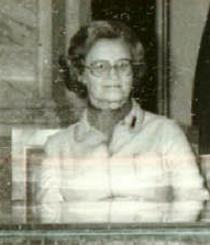
- Kirchschläger in 1978

First Lady of Austria
- In role 8 July 1974 – 8 July 1986
- President: Rudolf Kirchschläger
- Preceded by: Margarete Jonas
- Succeeded by: Elisabeth Waldheim

Personal details
- Born: Hermine Katharina Anna Sorger; 15 May 1916 Vienna, Austria-Hungary
- Died: 30 May 2009 (aged 93) Vienna, Austria
- Spouse: Rudolf Kirchschläger (m. 1940; died 2000)
- Children: Christa; Walter

Herma Katharina Anna Kirchschläger, GCIH (née Sorger; 15 May 1916 – 30 May 2009), was the wife of Rudolf Kirchschläger, the former Minister of Foreign Affairs and later Federal President of Austria. She served as Austria's First Lady from 1974 to 1986 during her husband's presidency.

== Early life and education ==
Born in Vienna's 5th district, Margareten, Herma was the daughter of a restaurateur. She had two brothers; her elder brother died on the Eastern Front during World War II, while her younger brother later took over the family restaurant. Due to food and heating shortages in Vienna during and after World War I, the family relocated to Kamegg, a suburb of Gars am Kamp, where they ran a guesthouse. Herma attended the local Bürgerschule in Gars am Kamp and later enrolled at the Piaristengymnasium in Horn, where she met her future husband, Rudolf Kirchschläger, at the age of 17. She graduated with her Matura in June 1935.

== Marriage and family ==
After working as a private tutor in Vienna, Herma married law student Rudolf Kirchschläger in August 1940; their civil ceremony took place in Rosenburg am Kamp, followed by a church ceremony in Gars am Kamp. The couple had two children: Christa (born 1944) and Walter (born 1947), who later became the founding rector of the University of Lucerne.

== Role as First Lady ==
As First Lady of Austria from 1974 to 1986, Herma Kirchschläger undertook numerous representational duties. She learned foreign languages and familiarized herself with diplomatic protocols to support her husband's official functions. Herma was actively involved in various charitable, humanitarian, and social projects. She collaborated with the International Committee for Voluntary Social Services, eventually becoming its honorary president, and supported the Mother and Child division of Caritas Socialis in Vienna. Additionally, she regularly participated in meetings of the ASEAN Ladies Circle of Vienna and was a member of the international women's organization Beta Sigma Phi.

== Later life and death ==
Following her husband's presidency, the Kirchschlägers resided in a townhouse in Vienna-Dornbach and spent summers at their villa in Rosenburg am Kamp. In 1998, they attended the celebrations marking the 80th anniversary of the founding of the Austrian Republic. Herma Kirchschläger died on 30 May 2009 in Vienna and was interred alongside her husband in the Presidential Crypt at Vienna's Central Cemetery.

== Honour ==
- Grand-Cross of the Order of Prince Henry, Portugal (1984)
