= Embassy of Austria, Moscow =

Embassy of Austria in Moscow Посольство Австрии в Москве Botschaft von Österreich in Moskau
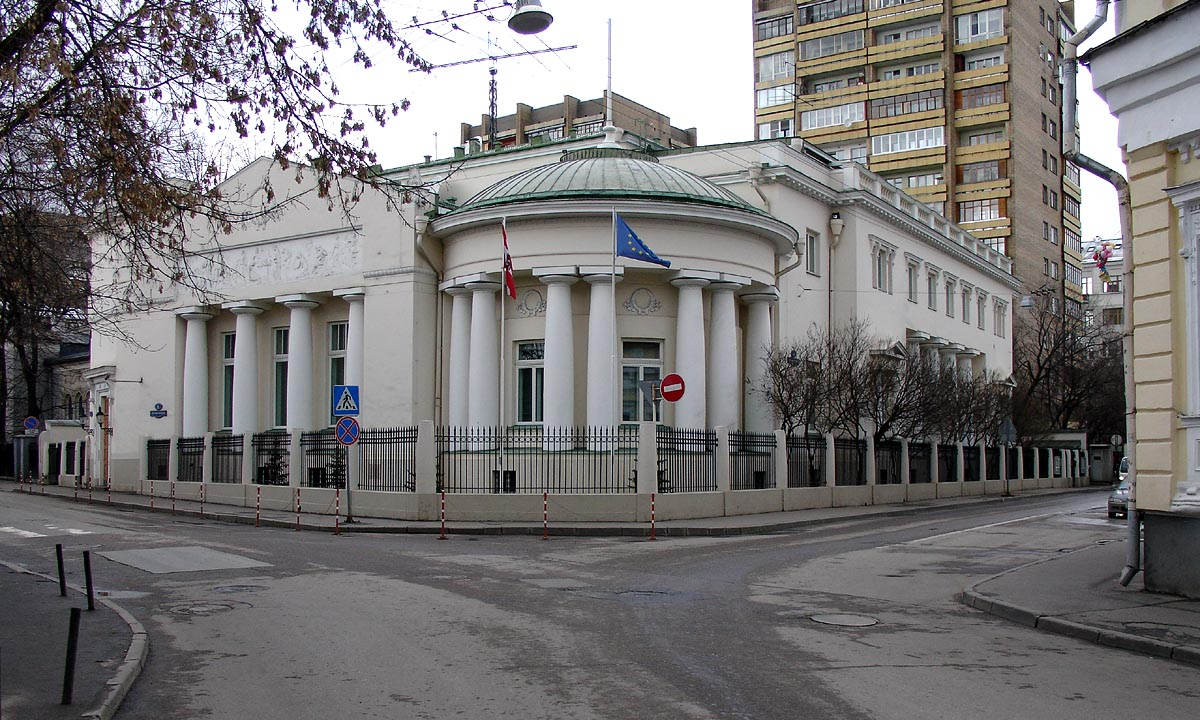
- Location: Moscow
- Address: Starokonyushenny Lane
- Coordinates: 55°44′37″N 37°35′42″E
- Ambassador: Martin Vukovich

The Embassy of Austria in Moscow is the diplomatic mission of the Republic of Austria to the Russian Federation. It is located at 1 Starokonyushenny Lane (Russian: Староконюшенный переулок, 1) in the Khamovniki District of Moscow. The consulate, located in the same building until 2007, now operates from a new nearby building at 7 Bolshoy Levshinsky Lane.

== The building ==
The Embassy occupies a listed neoclassical revival building, the Nikolay Mindovsky House, designed and built by Nikita Lazarev in 1906. Mindovsky family originated in Kineshma, where serf Ivan Ivanovich Mindovsky (1781–1853) launched his own textile mill. His grandson, Ivan Alexandrovich, commissioned the first historical Mindovsky House to Lev Kekushev (44, Povarskaya Street, present-day Embassy of New Zealand in Moscow). Next of kin, Nikolay Ivanovich, commissioned the second Mindovsky House to Nikita Lazarev. Various other members of the clan also owned mansions and apartment blocks in the city so as of 2008 there are six extant Mindovsky houses.

Mindovsky House that became Embassy of Austria stands on a strategic corner lot visible from Prechictenka Street. In the 18th century the area was occupied by a spacious Gagarin family estate, destroyed by the fire of 1812, then by wooden Mukhanov estate. In 1899 the dilapidated Mukhanov property was purchased by real estate developers and split into three lots; the first two buildings were built to William Walcot's design in 1900–1902, the third was purchased by Mindovsky.

Lazarev's Mindovsky House became a statement of neoclassical reaction against "Decadent art". The L-shaped structure extends over 32×44 meters. Its two main parts intersect at 90 degrees, while the streets actually cross at a sharper angle – this allowed placing a small garden in front of the corner rotunda hall, but the western facade with main entrance had to be tapered to fit into street boundary. Originally all the building was single story; in 1913 the owners rebuilt the eastern living wing into two stories. Eastern wing, which housed the consulate until 2007, was regularly remodelled later while the single-story formal halls of the western wing, facing Prechistensky Lane retain the original 1906 interiors.

The Embassy of Austria moved into Mindovsky House in 1927. After the anschluss of 1938, it was used as an exclusive villa for foreign dignitaries, housing guests like Joachim von Ribbentrop (August 1939, see Molotov–Ribbentrop Pact) and Winston Churchill (October 1944). However, the rumour that Molotov–Ribbentrop Pact was signed in Mindovsky House is, most likely, an urban legend. In April 1955 the building was the site of Austrian–Soviet talks on the Austrian State Treaty and then became an embassy of independent Austria for a second time.

Mindovsky House, specifically its corner hall, is also known as the site of a fictional shooting in the 1957 novel Doctor Zhivago by Boris Pasternak.

== See also ==
- Austria–Russia relations
- Diplomatic missions in Russia
