= Martin Vukovich =

Austrian diplomat

Martin Vukovich (born October 20, 1944, in Eisenstadt) is a former Austrian diplomat.

After obtaining a Baccalauréat from Lycée Francais de Vienne in 1962 and a PhD in law from University of Vienna in 1967 Vukovich entered into the Austrian Foreign Service in 1969. Soon afterwards he was transferred to the Austrian embassy in Moscow where he served as the Press and Political Officer from 1971 to 1976. In 1976 he became the first secretary of the Austrian embassy in Copenhagen. Two years later he returned to Austria where he became a Deputy Head of the Department for European Economic Integration at the Ministry for Foreign Affairs. In 1982 he was appointed Minister Counsellor at the Austrian embassy in Washington, D.C.

Vukovich returned to Moscow in 1985 where he served as a Minister Plenipotentiary and a Deputy Chief of Mission until 1989.

From 1989 to 1995 he headed the Department for the Conference on Security and Cooperation in Europe (CSCE) simultaneously becoming a Permanent Representative of Austria to the CSCE with the title of Ambassador.

From 1995 to 1999 Vukovich served as Austrian ambassador to Japan.

From 1999 to 2003 he was the Director for International Security Affairs and concurrently Deputy Political Director at the Austrian Foreign Ministry, being a member of the Austrian National Security Council from 2001 to 2003.

In 2003, Vukovich returned to Russia, serving as Austria's ambassador to the Russian Federation from 2003 to 2009.

Martin Vukovich retired in December 2009 and is since active for the think tank "Dialog-Europe-Russia".

Besides his native German Vukovich is fluent in English, French and Russian.
