= Edith Klestil =

Edith Klestil (née Wielander; 13 November 1932 – 29 March 2011) was an Austrian political figure, former First Lady of Austria, and the first wife of Thomas Klestil, the tenth President of Austria.

Edith Klestil was born in Vienna, the only child of a post office worker, Leopold Wielander, and his wife, Rosa. On 8 June 1957 she married Thomas Klestil, whom she met when they were both 17. She gave up her job in order to support her husband's career as a diplomat and accompanied him to Paris and Los Angeles. When her husband was elected federal president in 1992, she became Austria's first lady. Two years later, Thomas made public that he had a love affair with the much younger diplomat Margot Löffler. Edith left her husband in February 1994, and they were divorced in September 1998; Thomas married Löffler three months later.

When Thomas died in office on 6 July 2004, Klestil and their children attended the funeral service held in St. Stephen's Cathedral in Vienna.

It was announced on 4 April 2011 that Klestil had died of cancer, a few days earlier, in Vienna.

Honorary titles
Preceded by Elisabeth Waldheim	First Lady of Austria; 1992–1994	Vacant Title next held by Margot Klestil-Löffler
