= Embassy of Russia, Vienna =

Building in Vienna, Austria

Embassy of the Russian Federation in Vienna Посольство Российской Федерации в Вене Botschaft der Russischen Föderation in Wien
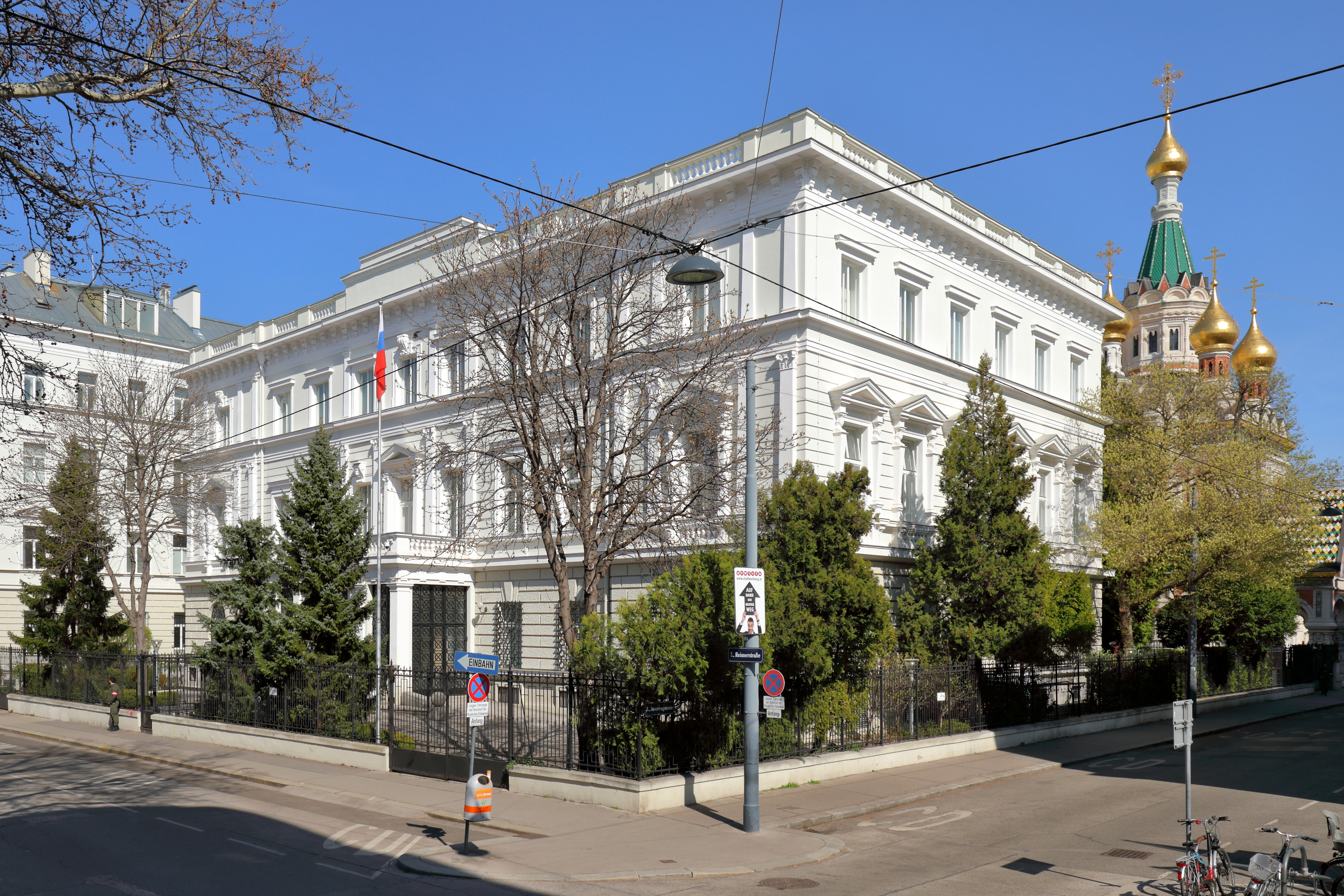
- Location: Vienna, Austria
- Address: Reisnerstraße 45-47
- Coordinates: 48°11′50.84″N 16°23′3.17″E
- Ambassador: Stanislav Osadchiy

The Embassy of Russia in Vienna is the diplomatic mission of the Russian Federation to the Republic of Austria. The chancery is located at Reisnerstraße 45–47 in the Landstraße district of Vienna.

== History of the chancery ==
The building which is now the embassy chancery was built in 1872–73 based upon the designs of architect Alois Wurm-Arnkreuz in Viennese Neo-Renaissance style. The façade of the building features an open balcony and a balustrade. The colonnade, stairs and interior are made of granite and marble.

In 1874 the palace was handed over to the deposed Duke of Nassau, Adolphe, who later became the Grand Duke of Luxembourg. In 1891 the building was acquired by Prince Aleksey Lobanov-Rostovsky, who was the ambassador of the Russian Empire in Vienna at the time, for use by the Russian mission. The palace later housed diplomatic representatives of the Soviet Union.

During the Vienna Offensive in 1945, the building suffered damage and was restored during 1947 and 1950. The chancery hosted a meeting between Nikita Khrushchev and John F. Kennedy in 1961 and was the site of meetings between Leonid Brezhnev and Jimmy Carter which led to the signing on 18 June 1979 of the historic SALT II agreement.

In the 1980s, a multifunctional diplomatic building complex was built at Erzherzog Karl-Straße 182, Vienna 22, which today houses an embassy school and various embassy departments, as well as spy facilities and corresponding apartments, in addition to apartments for secret service personnel at Sternwartestrasse 74.

As of 2022 embassy building is being used by diplomatic mission of the Russian Federation, but its legal ownership is disputed between Russia and Ukraine.

== Russian SIGINT ==
Russia uses its foreign missions for SIGINT espionage and sabotage. After the invasion of Ukraine, all European states ordered the closure of Russian missions - except Austria - Vienna is the most important location for Russian telecommunications reconnaissance in Europe. In 2022, there were still a total of 290 people living in Vienna who were accredited by the Russian embassy, the missions to the UN and the Organization for Security and Cooperation in Europe (OSCE). 75 of them are designated as administrative-technical staff. Austria expelled four embassy members after the Russian invasion of Ukraine.

Satellite reception systems are located on the roof of the main building, but even more so on the building on Erzherzog Karl-Straße. Austrian counterintelligence assumes that they are operated by SWR. Austrian DSN claimed in 2023: “Vienna acts as a hub for Russia in the signals intelligence (SIGINT) of NATO states.”

There is a remote satellite spy station on the roof of the Russian Mission to the United Nations. The expansion of this station began after 2014, with five satellit dishes. In 2022 there were 13 Sat dishes.

Russia is skimming the data transponders from Western satellites. In particular, communications via geostationary satellites near the equator, such as the Eutelsat network, are intercepted.

== Education ==
The Russian Embassy School in Vienna is a part of the institution.

== See also ==
- Austria–Russia relations
- List of Ambassadors of Russia to Austria
