= Ferdinand Trauttmansdorff =

Austrian diplomat (born 1950)

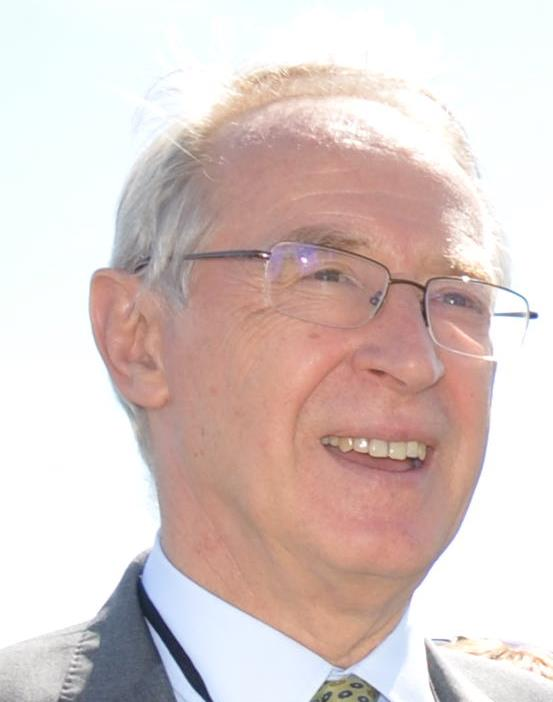
Ferdinand Trauttmansdorff (2015)

Ferdinand Trauttmansdorff (born 28 July 1950) was the Austrian ambassador in Prague from 2010-2015.

== Background ==
He belongs to the aristocratic Austrian-Moravian mediatised noble family Trauttmansdorff. He is also referred to by the courtesy style and title, "His Illustrious Highness Count Ferdinand von und zu Trauttmansdorff-Weinsberg" (unlawful in Austria since the abolition of noble titles and particles).

== Training and career ==
From 1970 to 1971 Trauttmansdorff completed the one-year voluntary military service in Austria.

After this he began to study law at the University of Graz. After graduation he served a one-year military service with the UN Forces in Cyprus. From 1975-1979 he worked as a study and research assistant and later as an assistant professor at the Institute for International Law and International Relations at the University of Graz.

Then he studied European Law at the Collège d'Europe in Bruges (1977/78) With his education and previous professional career, he succeeded in entering the Austrian foreign service in 1981. In his first years in the Austrian Foreign Service, he worked as a lecturer at the Austrian Mission in Geneva. In 1985, he was working at the Austrian Embassy in Bucharest. From 1985 to 1986, he took for his political activities the presidential campaign leave.

In the following years he was Arts Council at the Austrian Embassy in Washington, D.C. and then worked at the embassy in Budapest. Since 1999, he has been ambassador in Cairo, Khartoum and Lisbon.

From January 2010 to December 2015, Ferdinand Trauttmansdorff served as Austria’s ambassador to Prague.
