= Thomas Klestil =

President of Austria from 1992 to 2004

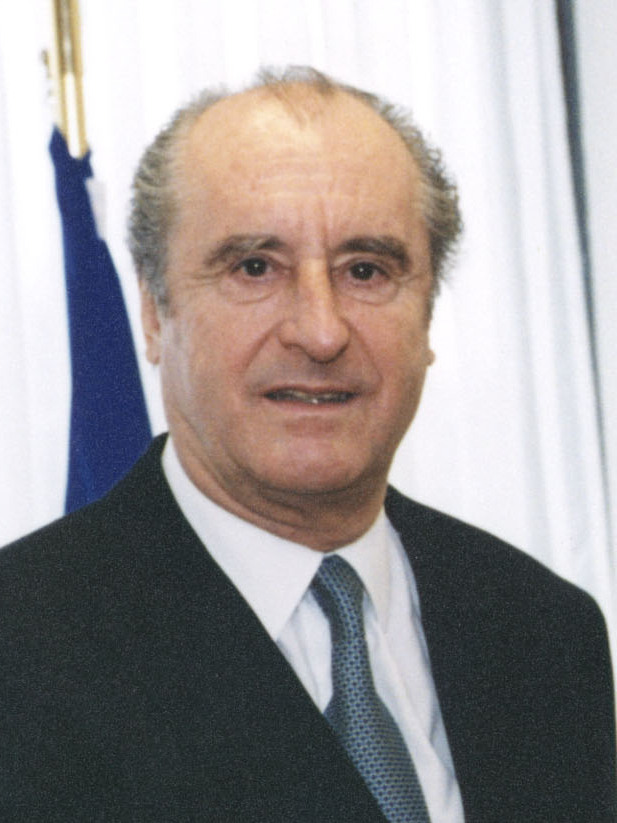
- Klestil in 2000

President of Austria
- In office 8 July 1992 – 6 July 2004
- Chancellor: Franz Vranitzky; Viktor Klima; Wolfgang Schüssel
- Preceded by: Kurt Waldheim
- Succeeded by: Heinz Fischer

Personal details
- Born: 4 November 1932 Vienna, Austria
- Died: 6 July 2004 (aged 71) Vienna, Austria
- Cause of death: Multiple organ failure
- Party: People's Party
- Spouses: Edith Klestil (m. 1957; div. 1998) Margot Klestil-Löffler (m. 1998)
- Education: Vienna University of Economics and Business

Thomas Klestil (German pronunciation: [ˈtoːmas ˈklɛstɪl]; 4 November 1932 – 6 July 2004) was an Austrian diplomat and politician who served as the president of Austria from 1992 until his death in 2004. He was elected in 1992 and re-elected in 1998.

== Early life and career ==
Born in Vienna to a working class family — his father was a tramway employee — Klestil went to school in Landstraße where he made friends with Joe Zawinul. He studied at the Vienna University of Economics and Business Administration and received his doctorate in 1957. After entering the civil service he worked in Austria as well as abroad, e.g. for OECD. In 1969, he established the Austrian consulate-general in Los Angeles, where he befriended Arnold Schwarzenegger. Fluent in English, Klestil served as the Permanent Representative of Austria to the United Nations (1978–1982) and Ambassador to the United States (1982–1987) prior to his election as president.

== Presidency ==
After being nominated by the conservative Austrian People's Party to run for president, he succeeded Kurt Waldheim on 8 July 1992. However, in the course of his two terms of office, Klestil's alienation from his own party became increasingly obvious, so much so that there was open antagonism between Federal Chancellor Wolfgang Schüssel and Klestil when, in 2000, the latter had to swear in the newly formed coalition government with Jörg Haider's Austrian Freedom Party. Klestil, who during his election campaign had vowed to be an "active" president, repeatedly criticized the Austrian government and, in an interview with a Swiss daily given in 2003, stated that, theoretically speaking, it was in his power to dismiss the government any time he found it necessary to do so. As a matter of fact, the Austrian constitution gives far-reaching powers to the president, but these had never been exercised by any of Klestil's predecessors.

=== Support of Kiryat Mattersdorf ===
Klestil gave his support to the development of Kiryat Mattersdorf, a Haredi Jewish neighborhood in northern Jerusalem founded by the Mattersdorfer Rav, Rabbi Shmuel Ehrenfeld, in 1959 in memory of the Siebengemeinden (Seven Communities) of Burgenland that were destroyed in the Holocaust, Mattersdorf being one of them. Ehrenfeld's son, Rabbi Akiva Ehrenfeld, who served as president of the neighborhood, established close ties with the Austrian government to obtain funding for several institutions, including a kindergarten and the Neveh Simcha nursing home. Following Klestil's official state visit to Israel in 1994, which included a side tour of Kiryat Mattersdorf, Klestil hosted Ehrenfeld at an official reception at the Hofburg Palace in Vienna on 24 January 1995.

== Personal life ==
Klestil met his future wife Edith Wielander (1932–2011) at the age of 17 in 1949. The marriage took place in 1957 and until the election as Austrian president in 1992, the couple had three children together. The couple separated in 1994, when Klestil made public that he had a love affair with diplomat Margot Löffler, twelve years his junior. The couple divorced in September 1998, and Klestil married Löffler three months later. When Thomas Klestil died in 2004, Wielander attended the funeral service.

Klestil suffered from health issues related to his lungs, including a serious illness in 1996.

== Death and burial ==
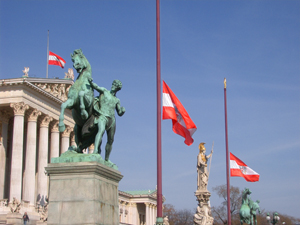
The Austrian flag flying at half-staff before the Austrian Parliament Building due to the death of Klestil on 7 July 2004

Klestil's arms as knight of the Order of the Seraphim

On 5 July 2004, three days before he was to leave office, he suffered a heart attack or heart failure, probably caused by his long-term lung problems, and was left in critical condition. He died on 6 July at 23:33 local time at the Vienna General Hospital from multiple organ failure.

On 10 July 2004, his state funeral service was held in St. Stephen's Cathedral in Vienna, and he was interred in the presidential crypt at Vienna's Central Cemetery (Zentralfriedhof). Among the notable dignitaries who attended his funeral were Russian president Vladimir Putin, former Austrian president and UN secretary-general Kurt Waldheim, and Austrian-born Governor of California Arnold Schwarzenegger. Klestil was the fifth president of Austria to die in office since 1950.

== Honours and awards ==
- Austria : Great Star of Honour for Services to the Republic of Austria (20 December 1992)
- Italy : Grand Cross with Collar of the Order of Merit of the Italian Republic (27 January 1993)
- Netherlands : Grand Cross of the Order of the Netherlands Lion (22 February 1994)
- Argentina : Grand Collar of the Order of the Liberator General San Martín (1995)
- United Kingdom : Knight Grand Cross of the Order of St. Michael and St. George
- Peru : Grand Cross of the Order of the Sun of Peru (1996)
- Norway : Grand Cross of the Order of St. Olav (8 April 1996)
- Sweden : Knight of the Royal Order of the Seraphim (5 February 1997)
- Spain : Knight of the Collar of the Order of Isabella the Catholic (8 July 1997)
- France : Grand Cross of the Legion of Honour (21 August 1998)
- Poland : Order of the White Eagle (23 September 1998)
- Ukraine : Grand Collar of the Order of Prince Yaroslav the Wise (13 October 1998)
- Slovakia : Grand Cross (or 1st Class) of the Order of the White Double Cross (1 November 1998)
- Romania : Collar of the Order of the Star of Romania (22 January 1999)
- Croatia : Grand Cross of the Grand Order of King Tomislav (2 March 2001)
- Thailand : Knight Grand Cordon (Special Class) of the Order of the White Elephant (MPCh) (2002)
- Grand Gold Medal with Star for services to the city of Vienna (3 October 2002)
- Algeria : Order of the Athir (13 March 2003)
- Portugal : Collar of the Order of Prince Henry

Diplomatic posts
Preceded by Peter Jankowitsch	Ambassador of Austria to the United Nations; 1978–1982	Succeeded by Karl Fischer
Preceded by Karl Herbert Schober	Ambassador of Austria to the United States; 1982–1987	Succeeded by Friedrich Hoess
Political offices
Preceded by Kurt Waldheim	President of Austria; 1992–2004	Succeeded by Heinz Fischer
