= Austria–Kosovo relations =

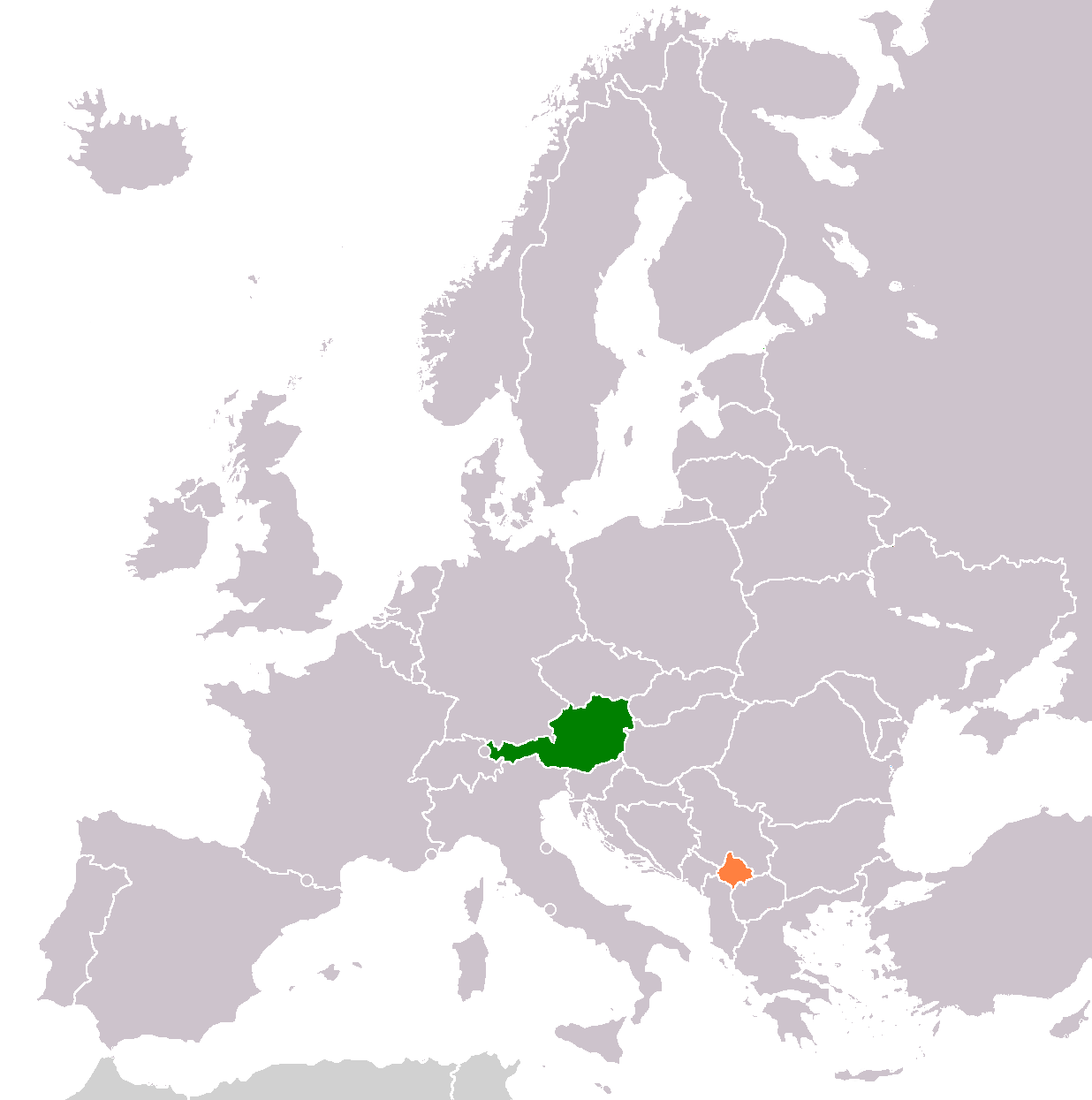
- Austria: Kosovo

Diplomatic mission
- Embassy of Austria, Pristina: Embassy of Kosovo, Vienna

Envoy
- Ambassador Christoph Weidinger: Ambassador Lulzim Pllana

Austria–Kosovo relations refer to the bilateral relations of Austria and Kosovo. Kosovo has an embassy in Vienna and Austria has an embassy in Pristina.

Austria was one of the first countries to recognise Kosovo's independence on 28 February 2008. As a European Union (EU) member, Austria supports Kosovo in its euro-integration path.

== Historical context of Austria-Kosovo relations ==
The historical relationship between Austria-Hungary and the Vilayet of Kosovo provides a foundation for understanding modern Austria-Kosovo relations. During the late Ottoman period, Kosovo, part of the Ottoman Empire, became an area of interest for Austro-Hungarian diplomacy and strategic planning, particularly between the late 19th and early 20th centuries.

Diplomatic and Strategic Engagements

The Vilayet of Kosovo, established in 1877, was a large administrative division of the Ottoman Empire that encompassed not only the territory of modern Kosovo but also parts of present-day Serbia, Montenegro, and North Macedonia. This broader geographical scope underscores its strategic importance to Austria-Hungary, as it served as a buffer zone between the Ottoman Empire and other Balkan states.

Austria-Hungary established consular offices in key towns of the Vilayet of Kosovo, including Prizren and Skopje, starting in the 1870s. These consulates were instrumental in gathering intelligence on the region's political dynamics and ethnographic diversity. Austrian officials observed Kosovo's multi-ethnic population, documenting interactions between Albanian, Serbian, and Ottoman communities, alongside growing tensions over administrative policies and resistance to Ottoman rule. The consulates also monitored Albanian national movements, which increasingly sought autonomy within the Ottoman framework.

Following the Treaty of Berlin in 1878, Austria-Hungary expanded its influence in the region by establishing a military presence in Bosnia and Herzegovina and extending diplomatic outreach into Kosovo. Recognizing the threat of Serbian expansionism, Austria-Hungary supported the Albanian national movement as a counterbalance, particularly after Serbia's annexation of neighboring territories.

== Diplomatic relations ==
Austria has been a steadfast supporter of Kosovo's sovereignty and its aspirations for European integration. Since Kosovo's declaration of independence in 2008, Austria has consistently advocated for Kosovo's recognition within the EU, while urging the country to meet necessary criteria, including minority protection. On 25 March 2011 Austrian Foreign Minister Michael Spindelegger stated that "Austria intends to increase its efforts to gain recognition for Kosovo's independence by all of the EU countries,... [and that] Kosovo needs to show the sceptical countries within the EU that it is doing what is necessary to protect its minorities".

In an exclusive interview, Christoph Weidinger, the Austrian Ambassador to Kosovo, affirmed that relations between the two countries are excellent across multiple sectors, including political, economic, cultural, and humanitarian. He remarked, “Austria is a strong supporter of Kosovo's membership in the European Union and supports the liberalization of visas, as set out in the program of the Austrian government.” In 2022, the European Parliament and the Council of the European Union agreed to lift the visa requirement for Kosovo citizens, a milestone for Kosovo's integration into European structures, which came into effect on 1 January 2024.

== Economic and development assistance ==
Austria has been an active partner in supporting Kosovo's post-independence development, focusing on fostering economic growth, governance reform, and Kosovo's integration into European structures. Austria's development cooperation with Kosovo is framed within the broader context of its foreign policy toward the Western Balkans, aiming to promote stability, democratic governance, and sustainable economic development. This cooperation is guided by Austria's Country Strategy for Kosovo (2013–2020), extended until 2021, and aligns with Kosovo's EU integration aspirations.

Austria's development assistance is structured around several core priorities, focusing on improving governance and public administration, strengthening the rule of law, and enhancing public services. Through the Austrian Development Agency (ADA), Austria has worked closely with Kosovo's government to promote institutional reform, transparency, and accountability. These efforts are aimed at aligning Kosovo's institutions with EU standards and fostering democratic governance. Public sector reform has been a key area of cooperation, as it is considered critical for Kosovo's progress toward EU membership.

Austria's contributions extend to key infrastructure projects, including energy and transportation, which are essential for connecting Kosovo to broader regional and European markets. Austrian ambassador Christoph Weidinger noted that Austria is the fourth-largest investor in Kosovo, with Austrian companies creating approximately 2,500 jobs. Additionally, Austria is a major donor in higher education and the UNICEF youth program in Kosovo through the ADA.

Austria has also played a vital role in Kosovo's economic transformation by supporting private sector development, diversifying the economy, and fostering foreign direct investment. According to the OECD, these efforts have helped Kosovo reduce its dependence on remittances and build a more competitive economic landscape. Austria's financial and technical support in the energy sector, aimed at integrating Kosovo into regional and EU energy markets, reflects its commitment to Kosovo's long-term stability.

Austria's assistance has not been limited to governance and infrastructure. In 2021, Austria coordinated the delivery of 95,000 doses of the Pfizer COVID-19 vaccine to Kosovo through the EU vaccine-sharing mechanism. This initiative bolstered Kosovo's pandemic response and highlighted Austria's commitment to healthcare challenges in the region.

While Kosovo remains one of the highest recipients of Official Development Assistance (ODA) per capita globally, Austria's contributions have been significant. In 2017, Kosovo's net ODA totaled US$392 million, with Austria providing US$8 million. This underlines Austria's long-term commitment to Kosovo's development and its integration into European structures.

== Military ==
Austria has maintained a significant military presence in Kosovo through its participation in the NATO-led Kosovo Force (KFOR) since July 2, 1999, as mandated by UN Resolution 1244. Austria's involvement underscores its commitment to international peacekeeping and stability in the Balkans. As of 2023, Austria had 273 troops in Kosovo.

By April 2024, Austria deployed its 50th contingent to Kosovo, consisting of approximately 190 soldiers under the leadership of Colonel Bernhard Gruber. Austria's forces are tasked with ensuring the security and freedom of movement for all communities in Kosovo, as well as supporting the maintenance of public order.

Protests of 2023

In May 2023, violent protests erupted in northern Kosovo, particularly in Zvecan, where Serbian demonstrators attempted to storm a municipal building. Italian and Hungarian KFOR soldiers faced attacks involving stones, bottles, and incendiary devices, resulting in 60 injuries among the international troops. Austrian KFOR soldiers, however, sustained no injuries during these events.

In response to the unrest, NATO reinforced KFOR, and Austria increased troop protection measures, deploying armored vehicles and personal protective equipment to ensure the safety of its contingent. Austrian defense minister Klaudia Tanner emphasized the importance of de-escalation and Austria's strategic interest in fostering peace and stability in the Balkans due to the region's geographical proximity and political significance.

These events highlighted the ongoing tensions in the region and reinforced the necessity of Austria's continued involvement in KFOR as a stabilizing force.

== See also ==
- Foreign relations of Austria
- Foreign relations of Kosovo
- Accession of Kosovo to the EU
- Austria–Serbia relations
- Austria–Yugoslavia relations
