= Embassy of Serbia, Vienna =

Building in Vienna, Austria

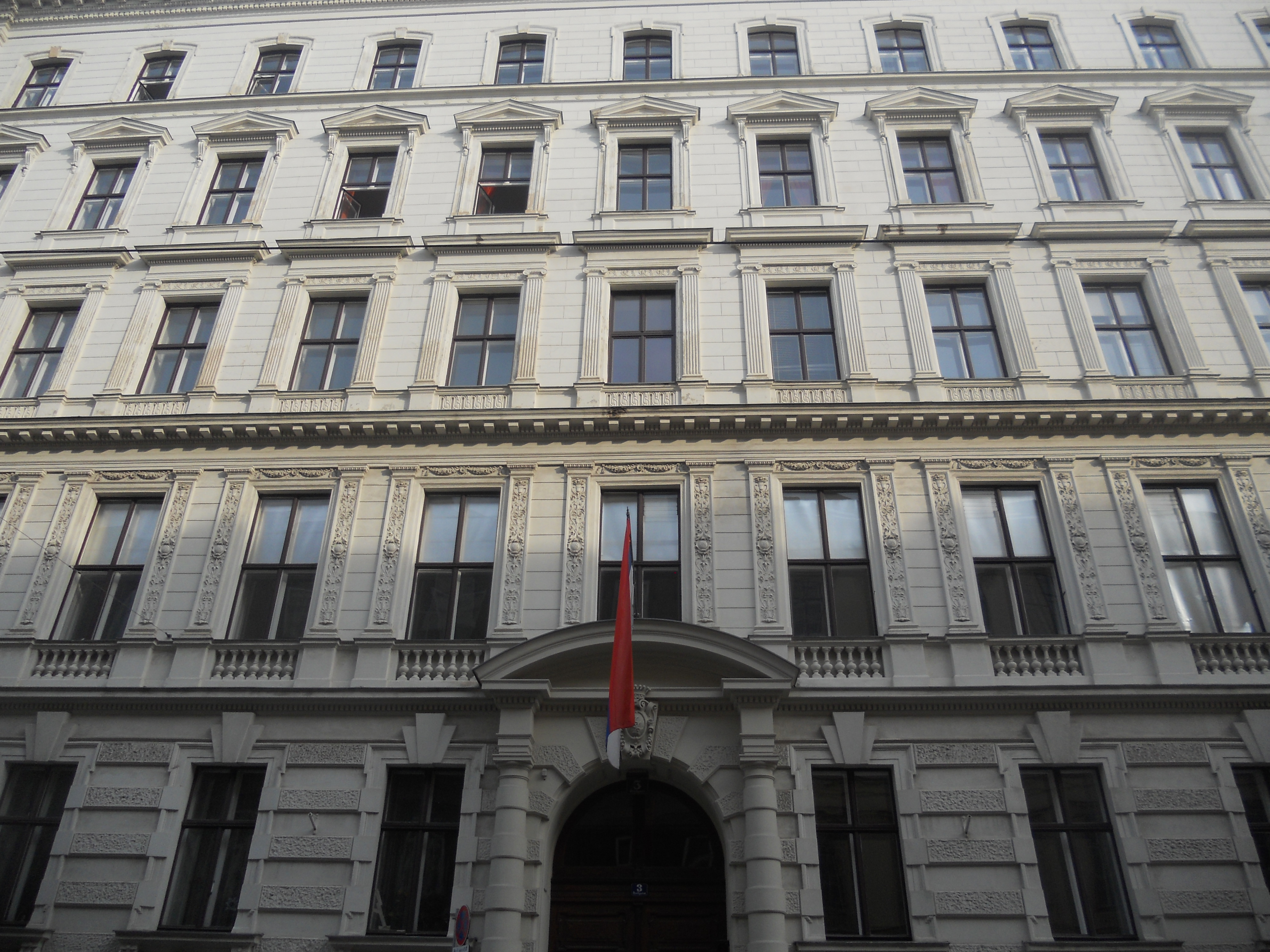
- Location: Vienna, Austria
- Address: Ölzeltgasse 3
- Coordinates: 48°11′52.8″N 16°22′41.79″E
- Ambassador: Marko Blagojević

The Embassy of Serbia in Vienna (German: Botschaft von Serbien in Wien, Serbian: Амбасада Србије у Бечу) is a diplomatic mission of Serbia in Austria. It is located at Ölzeltgasse 3.

== Consulates ==
Serbia also maintains a Consulate General in Salzburg and the Permanent Mission to the Organization for Security and Co-operation in Europe and United Nations in Vienna. Serbia closed its Consulate General in Graz which was inherited from Yugoslavia.

== History ==
Embassy of Serbia in Vienna was housed in the historic Palais Hoyos until 2011, when the building was handed over to Croatia as part of the Yugoslav succession. The palace was built at the end of the 19th century by Otto Wagner, together with two outbuildings. The palace was built in the style of the Historicism, with a Rococo façade and Jugendstil. In 1957, the palace of Hoyos in Rennweg was sold by the Hoyos family to Yugoslavia, which used it for the Embassy of Yugoslavia in Austria. After the dissolution of Yugoslavia, the building became a possession of Serbia. In 2009 the palace was thoroughly restored.

== See also ==
- Embassy of Austria, Belgrade
- Foreign relations of Serbia
- Austria–Serbia relations
- List of diplomatic missions of Serbia
