= Austria–Bosnia and Herzegovina relations =

- Austria: Bosnia and Herzegovina

Austria–Bosnia and Herzegovina relations are interstate relations between Austria and Bosnia and Herzegovina. Austria has an embassy in Sarajevo. Bosnia and Herzegovina has an embassy in Vienna. Both countries are full members of the Council of Europe. Austria is an EU member and Bosnia and Herzegovina is an EU candidate. For centuries, Bosnia was a disputed border region between the Habsburg Empire and the Ottoman Empire. After the Congress of Berlin in 1878, Bosnia and Herzegovina was taken over by Austria-Hungary and administered as the Condominium of Bosnia and Herzegovina. It was finally annexed in 1908, which led to the Bosnian crisis. The Serbian-Habsburg dispute over Bosnia led to the assassination of Archduke Franz Ferdinand of Austria in Sarajevo in 1914 by Bosnian Serb nationalist Gavrilo Princip, which triggered World War I and led to the collapse of the Habsburg Monarchy. Bosnia and Herzegovina then remained part of Yugoslavia until the 1990s. With the collapse of Yugoslavia, Austria recognized the independence of Bosnia and Herzegovina on April 7, 1992, and took in tens of thousands of Bosnian war refugees during the Bosnian War. Following the Dayton Agreement of 1995, Austria has become an important ally of Bosnia and has supported its rapprochement with the European Union. The importance of mutual relations is also underscored by close economic ties and the presence of numerous Bosnians in Austria.

== History ==
=== Early relations ===
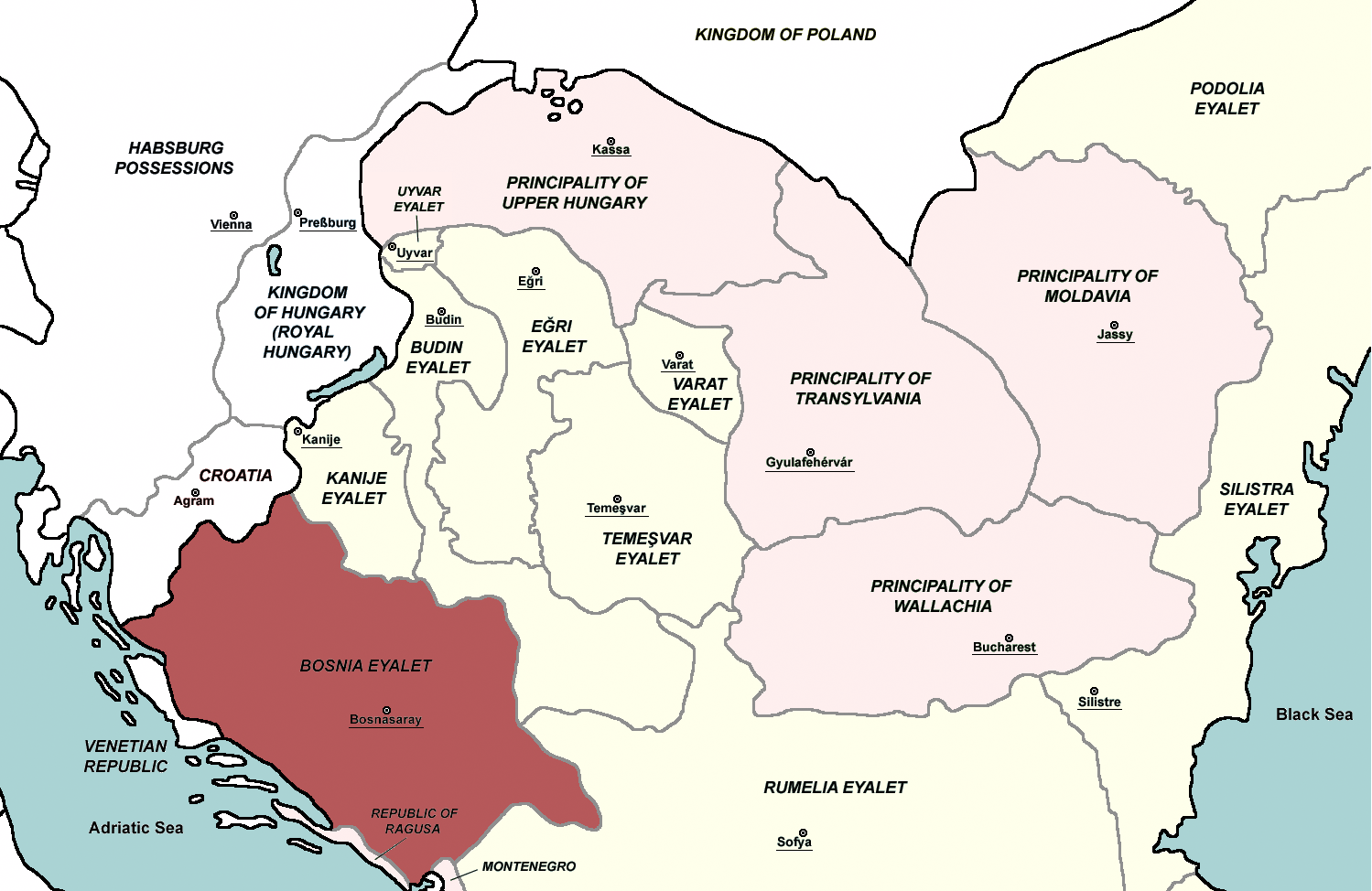
Location of the Ottoman Eyâlet Bosnia in 1683

The relationship between the territory of present-day Bosnia and Herzegovina and the Habsburg lands can be traced back to the early modern period. After the medieval Kingdom of Bosnia was conquered by the Ottoman Empire in the 15th century, Bosnia fell under the direct influence of the Ottomans and formed an outpost for their expansion towards Central Europe. In the centuries that followed, there were repeated military confrontations between the Habsburg Monarchy and the Ottoman Empire, which were also fought on Bosnian soil. Bosnia was the scene of fierce fighting during the Turkish Wars of the 17th and 18th centuries; among other things, imperial troops under Prince Eugene advanced as far as Sarajevo in 1697 and devastated the city., while a Habsburg attempt at conquest in 1737 (Battle of Banja Luka) failed. At the same time, there were occasional diplomatic contacts: the Habsburgs maintained their official contacts with the Ottoman province of Bosnia initially through the legation at the Sublime Porte in Istanbul. In the 19th century, Vienna's interest in Bosnia grew as Ottoman rule over the region became more fragile. Austrian consulates were established in important cities (such as Sarajevo), and Vienna sought to exert greater influence on the Christians of Bosnia, partly by granting protection to Catholic communities. However, these early contacts were generally marked by rivalry between the great powers and remained largely conflict-ridden until the end of the Ottoman period.

=== Bosnia under Austro-Hungarian rule ===
Coat of arms of Bosnia and Herzegovina under Austro-Hungarian rule from 1889

The Ottoman central government was only able to maintain order in Bosnia to a limited extent, and the major European powers exploited the situation to further their own interests. After the Russian-Ottoman War of 1877/78, it was finally decided at the Congress of Berlin in 1878 to place Bosnia and Herzegovina under Austro-Hungarian administration. Although the Sultan's formal sovereignty over Bosnia remained in name, Austro-Hungarian troops marched into Bosnia in the summer of 1878, effectively ending more than four hundred years of Ottoman rule. The occupation initially met with considerable armed resistance from the local population – in several regions of Bosnia, uprisings and skirmishes against the Austro-Hungarian troops broke out in 1878. After the occupation had been enforced militarily, Vienna effectively regarded the area as a colonial administrative territory within its own sphere of influence in the Balkans.

The Habsburgs largely replaced the Ottoman administrative and legal system with their own structures: all senior positions in the judiciary and administration were filled with officials from all parts of Austria-Hungary, while only the lowest offices (such as local mayors) remained in office. At the same time, Austria-Hungary invested heavily in the modernization of Bosnia—roads and railways were built, cities were expanded, and a modern school system was introduced. However, these infrastructure measures were not entirely altruistic: they also served to better exploit Bosnia's natural resources (wood, ore, agricultural products) and generate economic gains for the dual monarchy. To ensure stability, the k. u. k. administration involved local elites in the administration and largely respected religious freedom. As a result, the position of Muslim landowners remained untouched, and in 1912 Austria-Hungary officially recognized Islam as a religious community – a first in Europe.

In 1908, Bosnia and Herzegovina were formally annexed by Austria-Hungary, triggering a serious international crisis (the “Bosnian Crisis”) and increasing tensions with Serbia and Russia. As a result, Serbian nationalist resistance to the Habsburg presence grew; on June 28, 1914, the Bosnian Serb assassin Gavrilo Princip killed the Austrian heir to the throne, Archduke Franz Ferdinand, in Sarajevo, an event that went down in history as the trigger for World War I. The collapse of Austria-Hungary in 1918 ended Habsburg rule in Bosnia. The country became part of the newly founded Kingdom of Serbs, Croats, and Slovenes (later Yugoslavia) and thus left the Austrian state.

=== Relations after 1918 ===
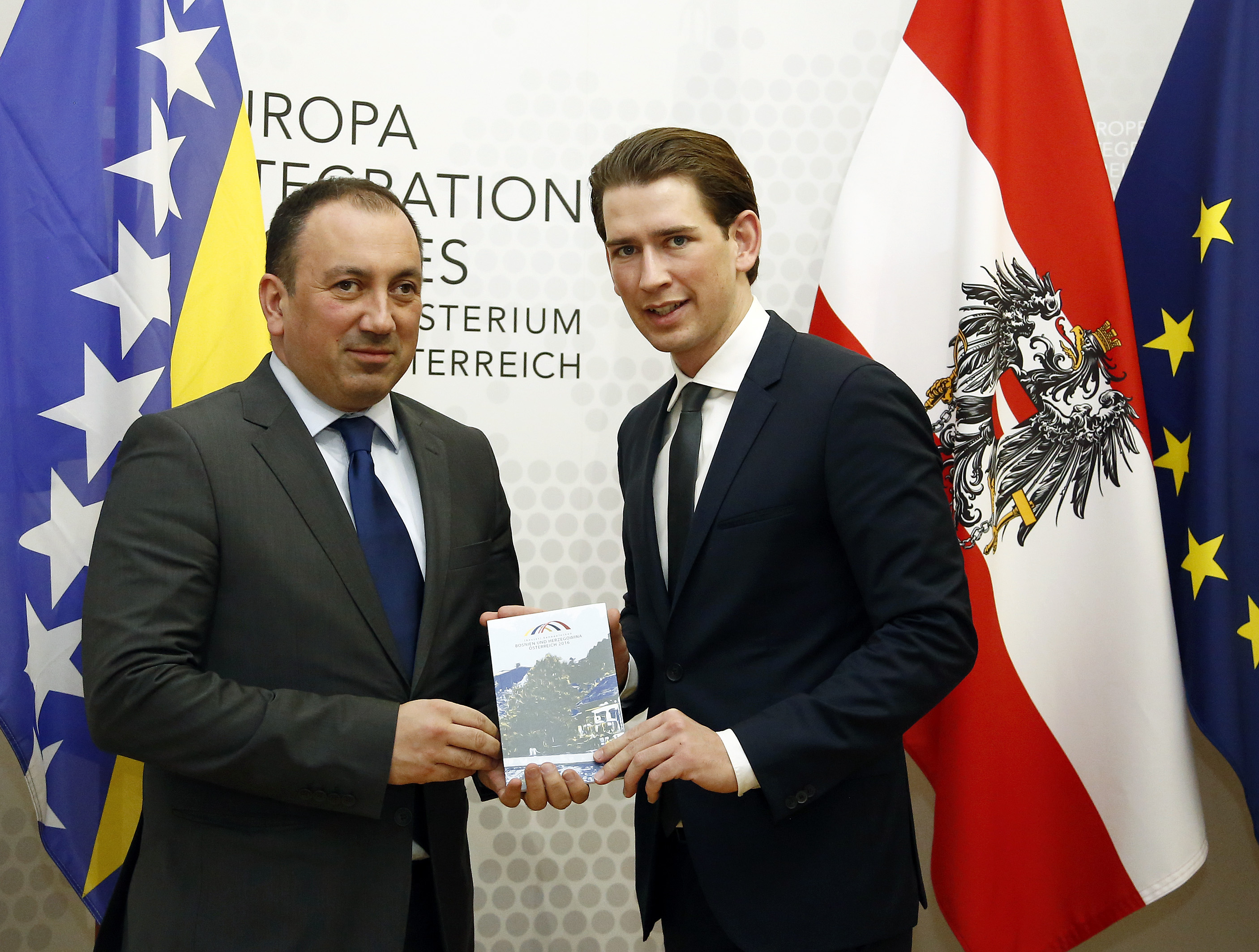
Bosnian Foreign Minister Igor Crnadak with Sebastian Kurz (2016)

After the collapse of the Habsburg Monarchy in 1918, there were initially no direct diplomatic relations, as Bosnia and Herzegovina, as part of Yugoslavia, did not pursue an independent foreign policy. However, during the socialist era of Yugoslavia (1945–1992), Austria maintained constructive contacts with Belgrade, which also benefited the Bosnian republic, for example through trade relations and cultural exchange. From the 1960s onwards, Austria became an attractive destination for many Bosnian migrant workers; in the wake of Yugoslav guest worker migration, tens of thousands of Bosnians (including Bosniaks and Bosnian Serbs) settled permanently in Austria. Austria recognized Bosnia and Herzegovina's declaration of independence from Yugoslavia on April 7, 1992, and diplomatic relations were established one day later. During the Bosnian War from 1992 to 1995, Austria provided extensive humanitarian aid and offered protection to a total of around 90,000 Bosnian war refugees. Most refugees returned after the conclusion of the Dayton Agreement, which federalized the country.

After the end of the war, Vienna played a key role in international efforts to stabilize Bosnia. Austria contributed troops to the peace missions (UNPROFOR, IFOR/SFOR, and, since 2004, EUFOR Althea) and provides contingents as part of the EU-led operation in Bosnia and Herzegovina. In addition, Austrian diplomats played key roles in the civilian implementation of the Dayton Peace Agreement: Austrian SPÖ politician Wolfgang Petritsch served as High Representative for Bosnia and Herzegovina from 1999 to 2002, followed by Carinthian diplomat Valentin Inzko from 2009 to 2021. Both exercised extensive supervisory and veto powers in Bosnia on behalf of the international community. In the years that followed, Austria consistently positioned itself as an advocate for Bosnia and Herzegovina at the EU level. Vienna successfully pushed for Bosnia and Herzegovina to be granted EU candidate status, which was officially granted in December 2022. Bilateral relations are considered extremely friendly and intensive – the Austrian government describes the relationship as “excellent.”. One expression of this close relationship is that an Austrian diplomat (Johann Sattler) served as EU Special Representative and Head of the EU Delegation in Sarajevo between 2019 and 2024.

== Economic relations ==
Bosnia and Herzegovina and Austria have traditionally enjoyed very close economic ties. Austria has been one of the largest investors in Bosnia and Herzegovina since the 1990s: by the end of 2022, Austrian direct investment there totaled around 1.2 billion euros. Around 200 Austrian companies and branches operate in Bosnia, mainly in contract manufacturing and the financial sector (banks and insurance companies), but also in construction, logistics, and retail (e.g., food and drugstore chains). Austria is also an important trading partner for Bosnia, but unusually has a trade deficit: In 2023, bilateral trade volume amounted to just under 1.6 billion euros, with Bosnia and Herzegovina exporting around 344 million euros more to Austria than vice versa. This deficit is due to the fact that many Austrian companies based in Bosnia supply a large part of their production to their parent companies in Austria. Trade relations are embedded in the broader context of EU integration: a Stabilization and Association Agreement has been in force since 2008 between Bosnia and Herzegovina and the EU, the country's most important trading partner (around 73% of Bosnian exports go to the EU). In addition, Bosnia and Herzegovina has free trade agreements with the EFTA, the CEFTA group of countries, Turkey, and other countries, which also creates favorable conditions for Austrian investors and exporters. Austria also supports Bosnia in development cooperation and through the transfer of expertise in order to promote convergence with EU standards.

== Culture and migration ==
Migration forms an important bridge in relations between the two countries. Today, there is a large Bosnian-Herzegovinian diaspora living in Austria, which can be traced back to various waves of immigration. Many Bosnian workers came to Austria as so-called “guest workers” in the 1970s, and an even larger influx was triggered by the war in the 1990s, when tens of thousands of Bosnians arrived in the country as refugees. The Bosnian community in Austria is estimated to number around 168,000, making it one of the largest migrant groups in the country. This community is internally diverse and reflects Bosnia's multi-ethnic origins: Bosniak Muslim, Croatian Catholic, and Serbian Orthodox associations and cultural centers exist side by side, each maintaining their own traditions.

At the state level, both countries promote cultural exchange through institutions and programs. Since 2018, there has been an Austrian Cultural Forum in Sarajevo, which is part of the Austrian Embassy and supports a wide range of cultural projects in the arts, music, literature, and science. Educational cooperation—for example, through the Austrian Exchange Service (OeAD) and scholarship programs—also gives many Bosnian students the opportunity to study in Austria, which strengthens academic exchange. In addition, there are city partnerships and regular events that promote mutual understanding.

== Diplomatic missions ==
- Bosnia and Herzegovina has an embassy in Vienna.
- Austria has an embassy in Sarajevo.
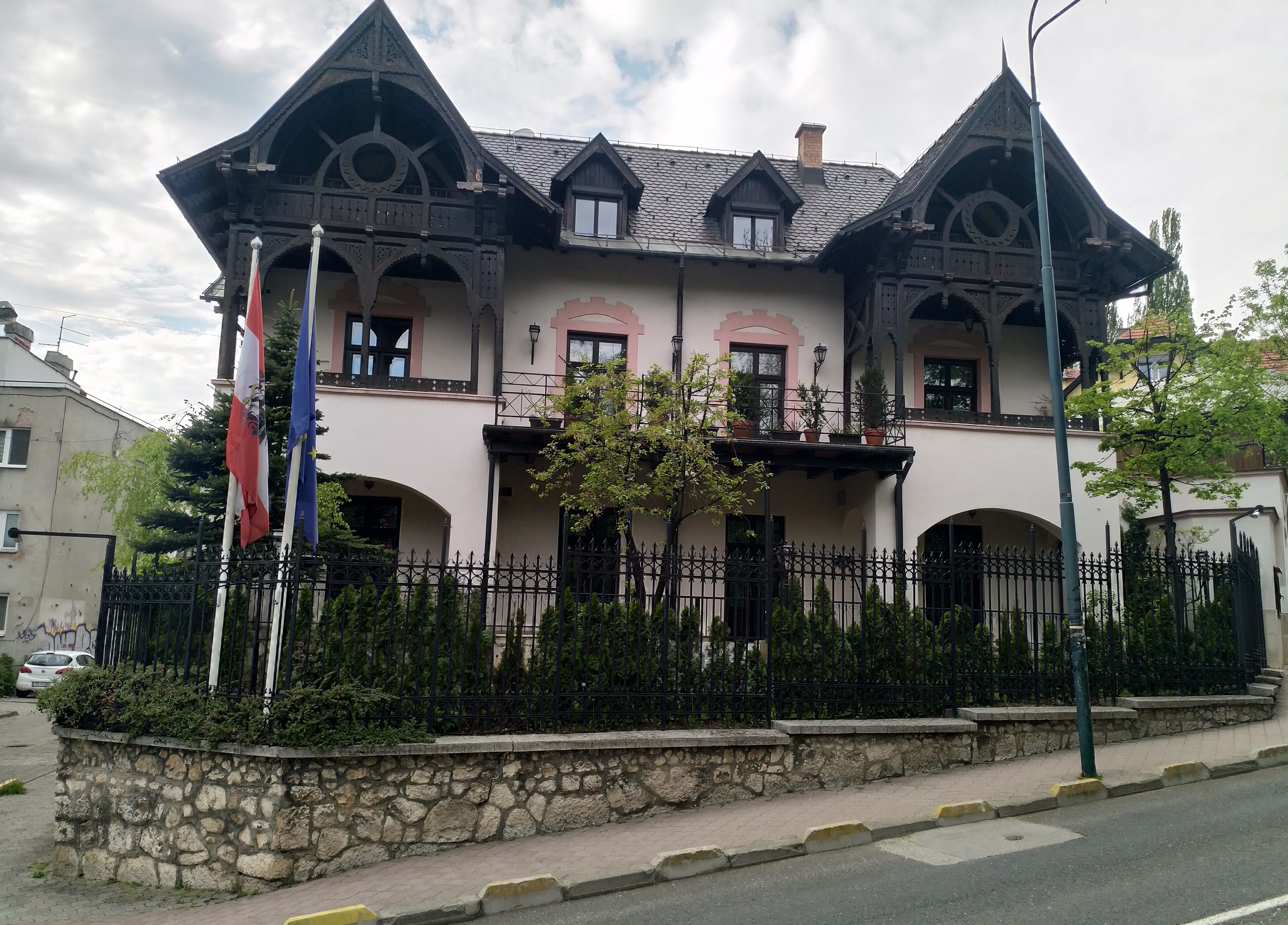
Austrian Embassy in Sarajevo

== See also ==
- Foreign relations of Austria
- Foreign relations of Bosnia and Herzegovina
- Accession of Bosnia and Herzegovina to the European Union
- Austria–Yugoslavia relations
