= Embassy of Austria, Belgrade =

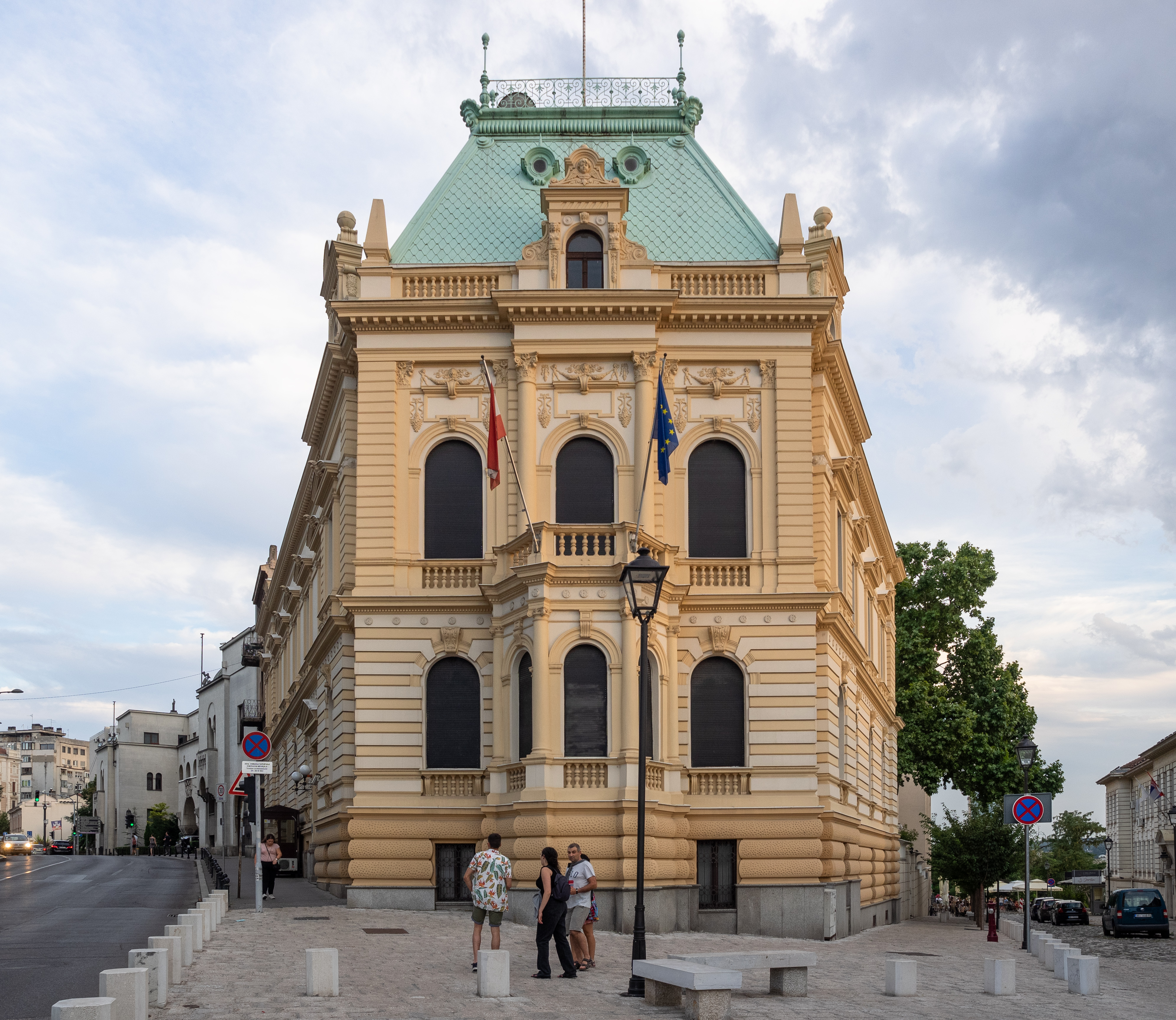
- Location: Belgrade, Serbia
- Address: Kneza Sime Markovića 2
- Coordinates: 44°49′06″N 20°27′05″E
- Ambassador: Christian Ebner

The Embassy of Austria in Belgrade (German: Österreichische Botschaft Belgrad, Serbian: Амбасада Аустрије у Београду, romanized: Ambasada Austrije u Beogradu) is the diplomatic mission of Austria in the Serbia. Since 1955 the embassy is housed in representative building in the city centre of Belgrade designed by Milorad Ruvidić and built between 1898 and 1899.

== History ==
Formal diplomatic relations between Austria-Hungary and Principality of Serbia were established in 1874.

After the end of World War II in Yugoslavia rapprochement between SFR Yugoslavia and Allied-occupied Austria was marked by the visit of Austrian Foreign Minister Karl Gruber to Yugoslavia in 1952. This was the first time a Western foreign minister had visited the country. The following year, Yugoslav Foreign Minister Koča Popović visited Austria, and during his visit, the diplomatic missions of Austria in Belgrade and Yugoslavia in Vienna were elevated to the status of embassies.

In 2021 exhibition was organised at the Belgrade Fortress commemorating 185 years since the establishment of bilateral relations between Austria and Serbia and 20 years of work of the Austrian Cultural Forum in Serbia.

== See also ==
- Embassy of Serbia, Vienna
- Austria–Serbia relations
- Serbs in Austria
- Austria–Yugoslavia relations
- July Crisis
- Bosnian Crisis
- Austro-Hungarian occupation of Serbia
- Great Migrations of the Serbs
