= Milorad Ruvidić =

Serbian architect

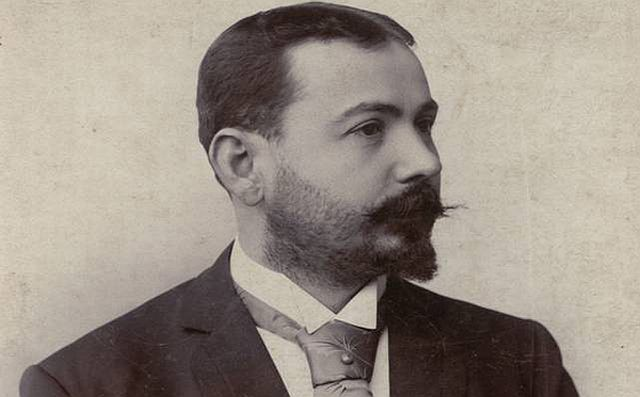
Milorad Ruvidic

Milorad Ruvidić (in Cyrillic Serbian: Милорад Рувидић; Lipolist, Principality of Serbia, 5 April 1863 - Belgrade, Kingdom of Serbia, 4 January 1914) was a Serbian architect who lived and worked in the formative period of the Belle Époque that swept the continent and changed the landscape of all major European capitals, including Belgrade.

== Biography ==
Milorad Ruvidić was born on 5 April 1863 in the village of Lipolist in Šabac, Serbia. As the son of Marija and Very Reverend Rajko Ruvidić, he attended the Gymnasium in Belgrade (better known as Realka High School), opting to pursue further studies in technical sciences. Milorad Ruvidić graduated in September 1884 from the Technical Faculty of the Belgrade's Velika škola, with twelve other colleagues who received government scholarships to study abroad. In 1884 he moved to Berlin and received his technical and artistic education in architecture at a Polytechnic Institute, better known as Königlich Technische Hochschule Charlottenburg ("TH Charlottenburg"). In 1893 he returned to Serbia where he entered the Royal Serbian government's Ministry of Public Works, where he was concerned with building construction. Later, he also taught architecture at the Velika škola, his alma mater.

== Works ==
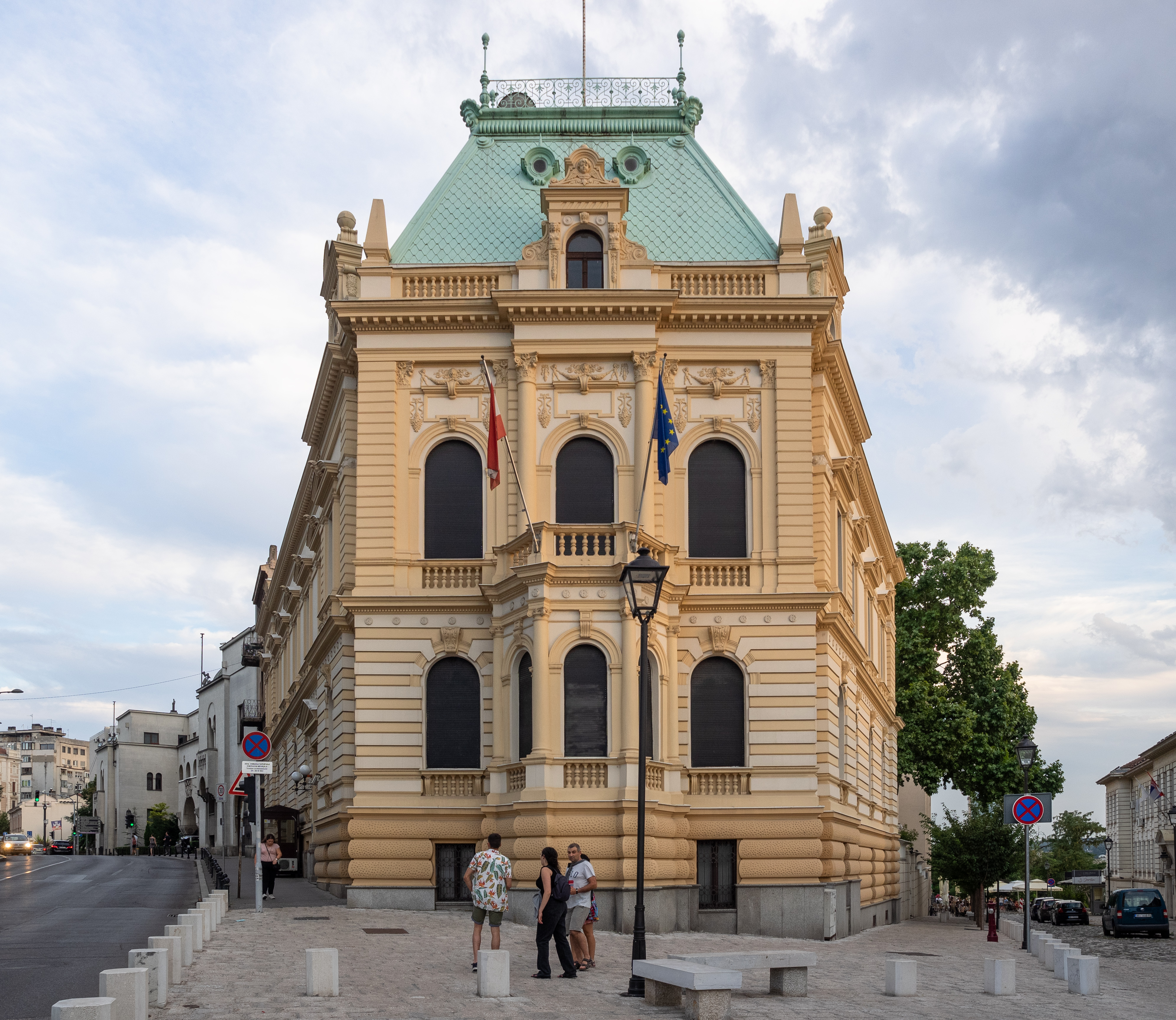
Embassy of Austria in Belgrade

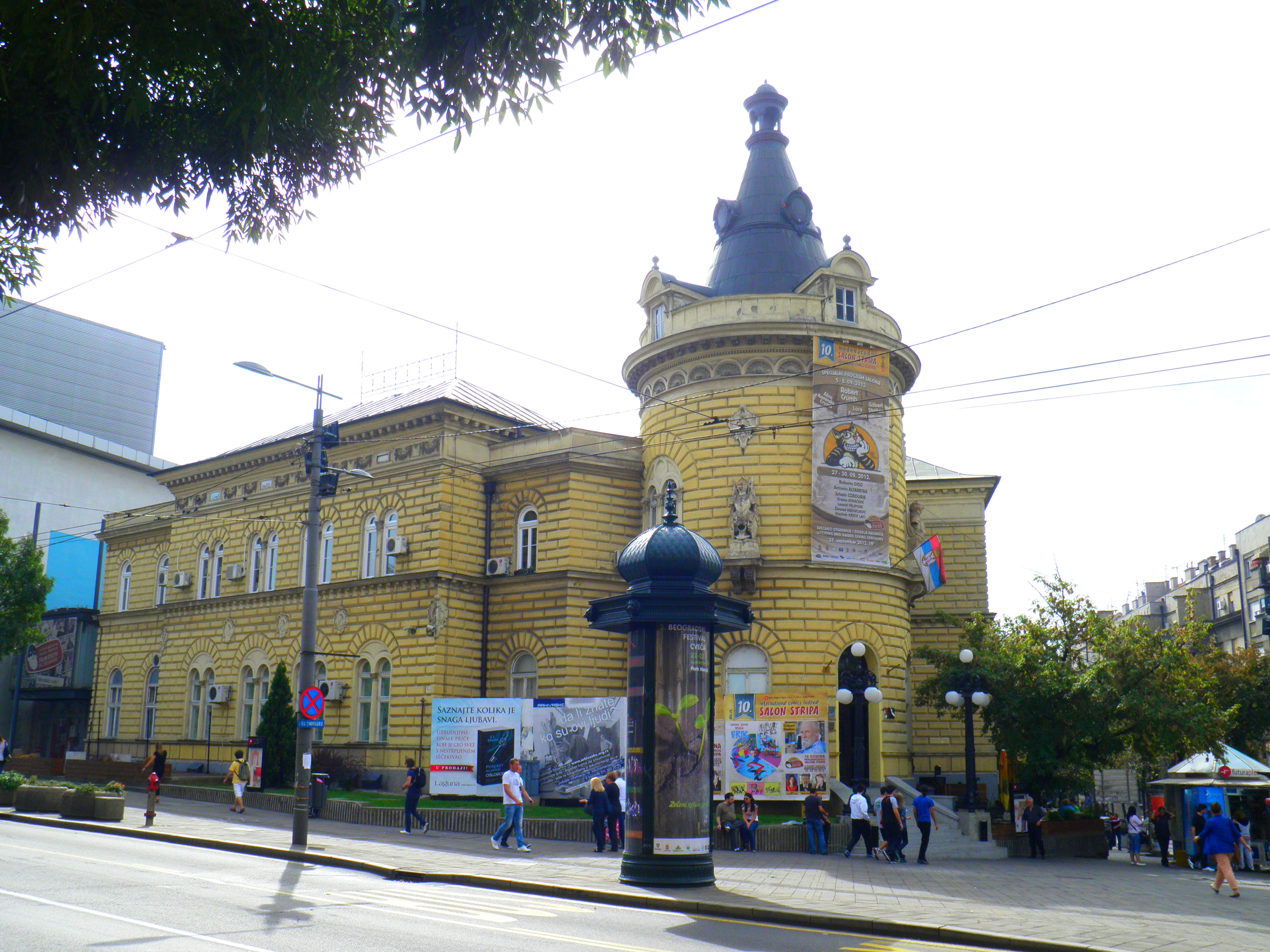
Officer's mess in Belgrade

In collaboration with Jovan Ilkić, he built the building of the officers' mess in Belgrade in 1895, inscribed on the list of cultural treasures of the city of Belgrade. In 1898-1899 Milorad Ruvidić built the house of Dimitrije Krsmanović in Belgrade; due to its architectural importance, this building appears on the list of protected cultural monuments of the Republic of Serbia, and on the list of protected cultural treasures of the City of Belgrade; it now houses the Austrian Embassy in Belgrade.

Milorad Rudivić and Milan Kapetanović collaborated on the plan and design of the Serbian Pavilion in Paris in 1900 for the Exposition Universelle. Serbia's church-like pavilion not only presented a fully-fledged statement of state-sponsored notions of national identity but also functioned as a direct ideological challenge to empires and countries alike that it was more than fit to enter into the comity of nations.

The Smederevo Bank building in Belgrade, built between 1910 and 1912 and characteristic of Art Nouveau and in pure Secession style, is on the list of cultural monuments of great importance of the Republic of Serbia, and on the list of protected cultural treasures of the City of Belgrade.

In 1911, Milorad Ruvidić and Branko Tanazević built the iconostasis of the Church of the Holy Transfiguration (Crkva Preobrazenje) of Pančevo; this church, constructed on plans by Svetozar Ivačković, is also on the list of cultural monuments of exceptional importance in the Republic of Serbia.
