= Austria–Slovenia border =

International border

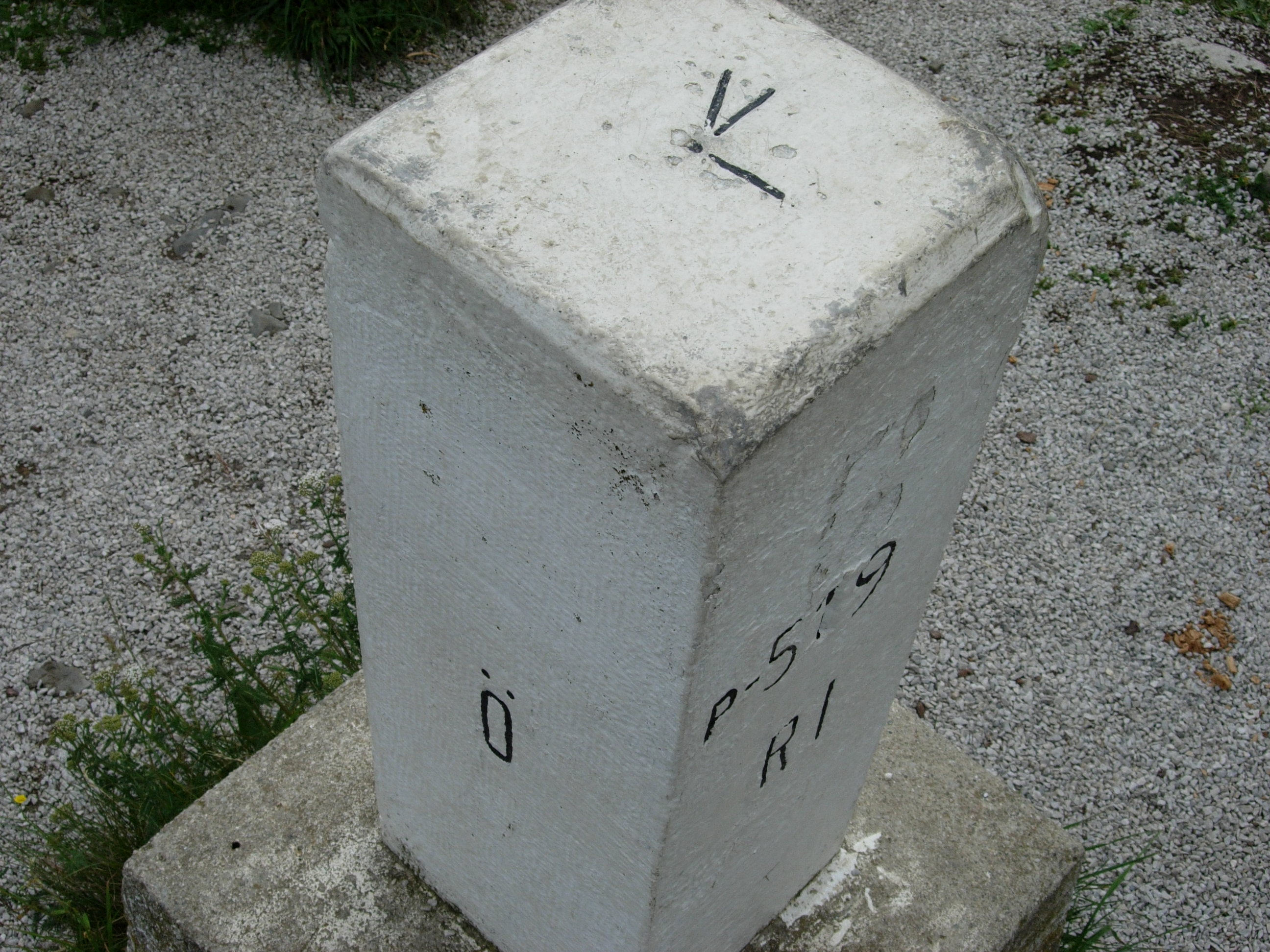
Border tripoint between Italy, Slovenia and Austria, at an altitude of 1,500 metres (4,900 ft)

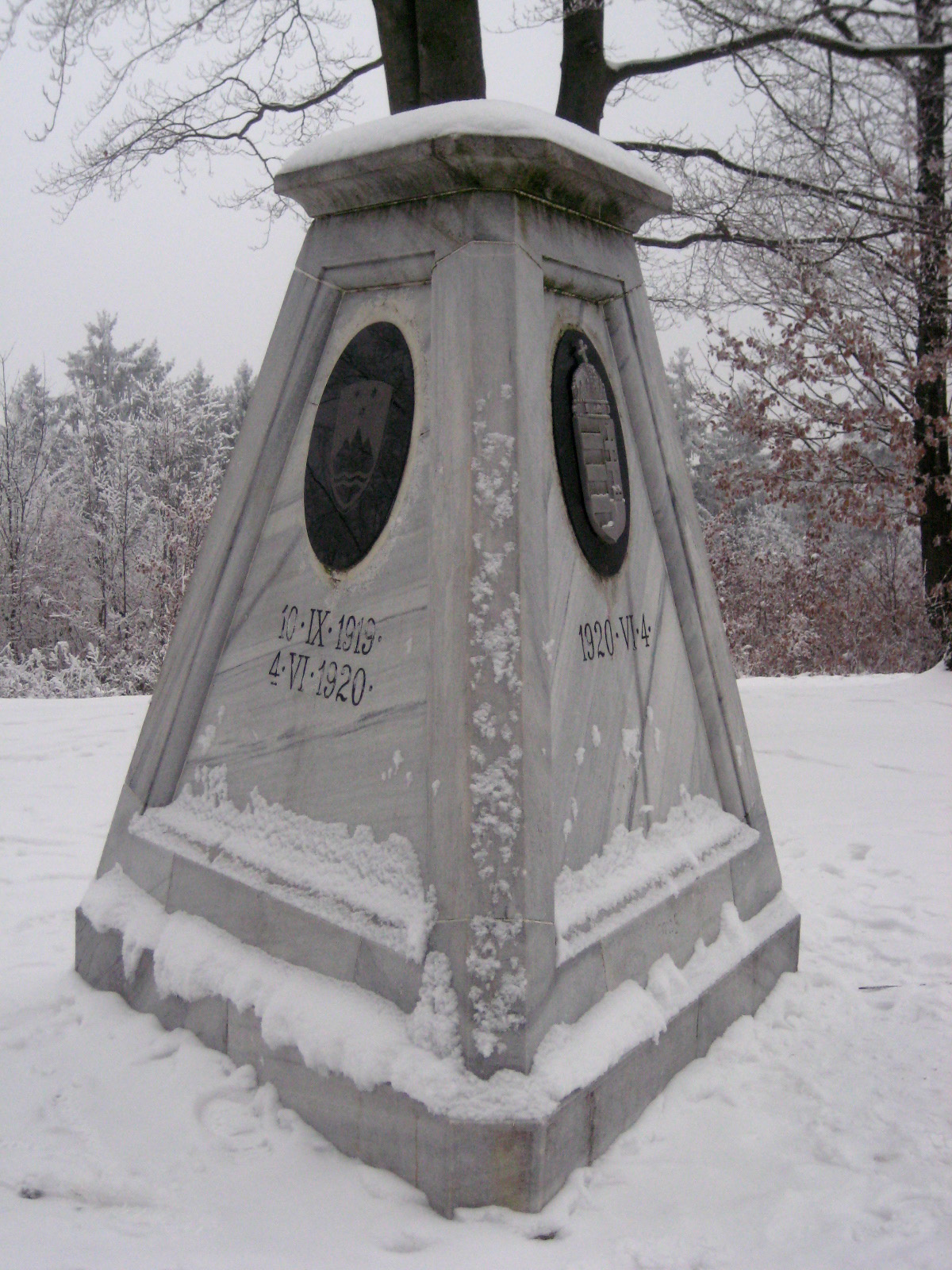
Border tripoint between Austria, Hungary, and Slovenia

The Austrian–Slovenian border is a 330-kilometre (210 mi) land border between the Republic of Austria and the Republic of Slovenia.

Until 1991, it was the border between Austria and Yugoslavia; when Slovenia gained independence in 1991, it became the Austrian–Slovenian border.

== See also ==
- Austria–Slovenia relations
