= Austria–Montenegro relations =

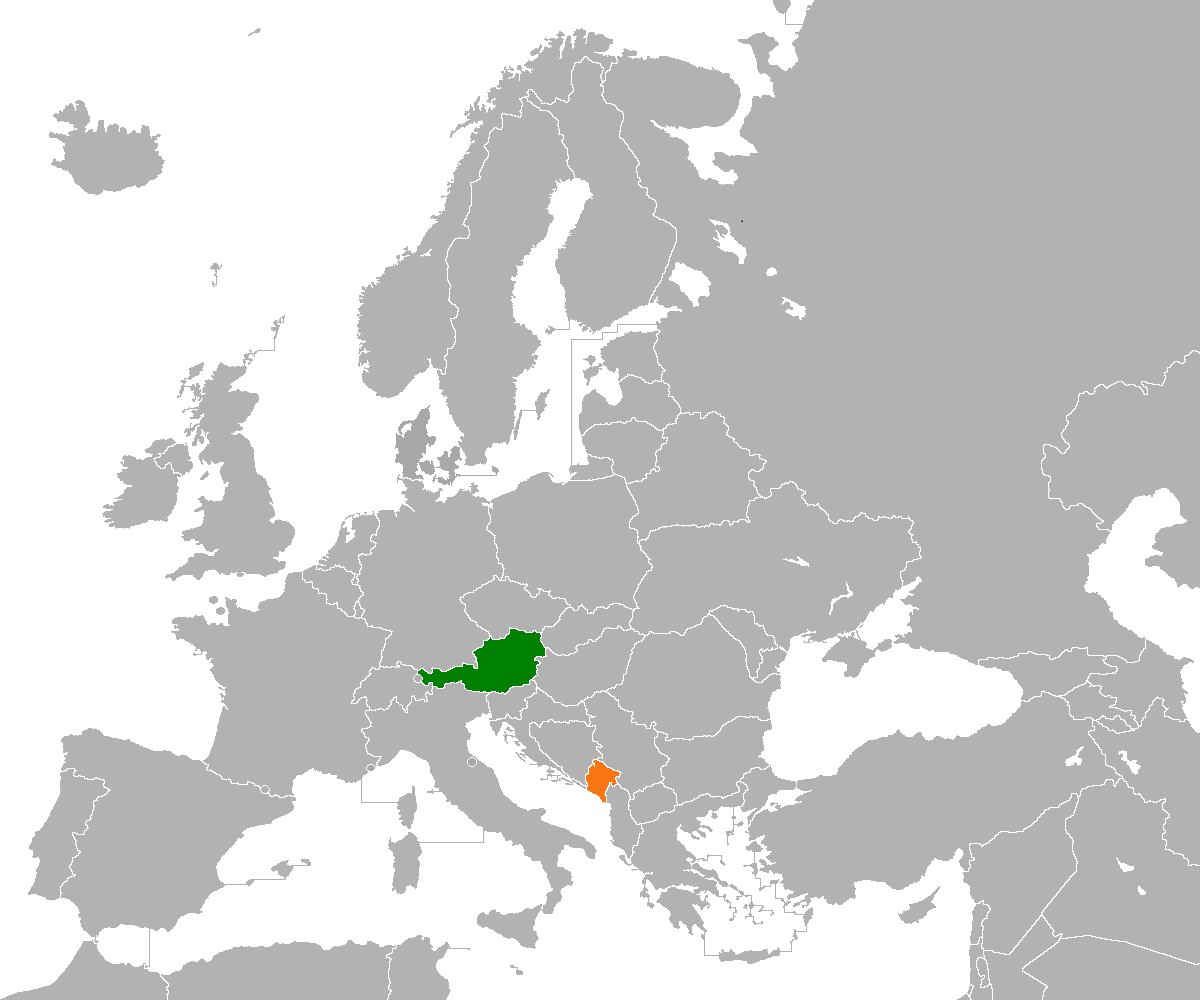

- Austria: Montenegro

Foreign relations exist between Austria and Montenegro. Austria recognized Montenegro on 12 June 2006. Both countries established diplomatic relations with each other on the same day. Austria has an embassy in Podgorica and an honorary consulate in Budva. Montenegro has an embassy in Vienna. Austria is an EU member and Montenegro is an EU candidate. Austria supports Montenegro's EU membership.

== Resident diplomatic missions ==
- Austria has an embassy in Podgorica.
- Montenegro has an embassy in Vienna.
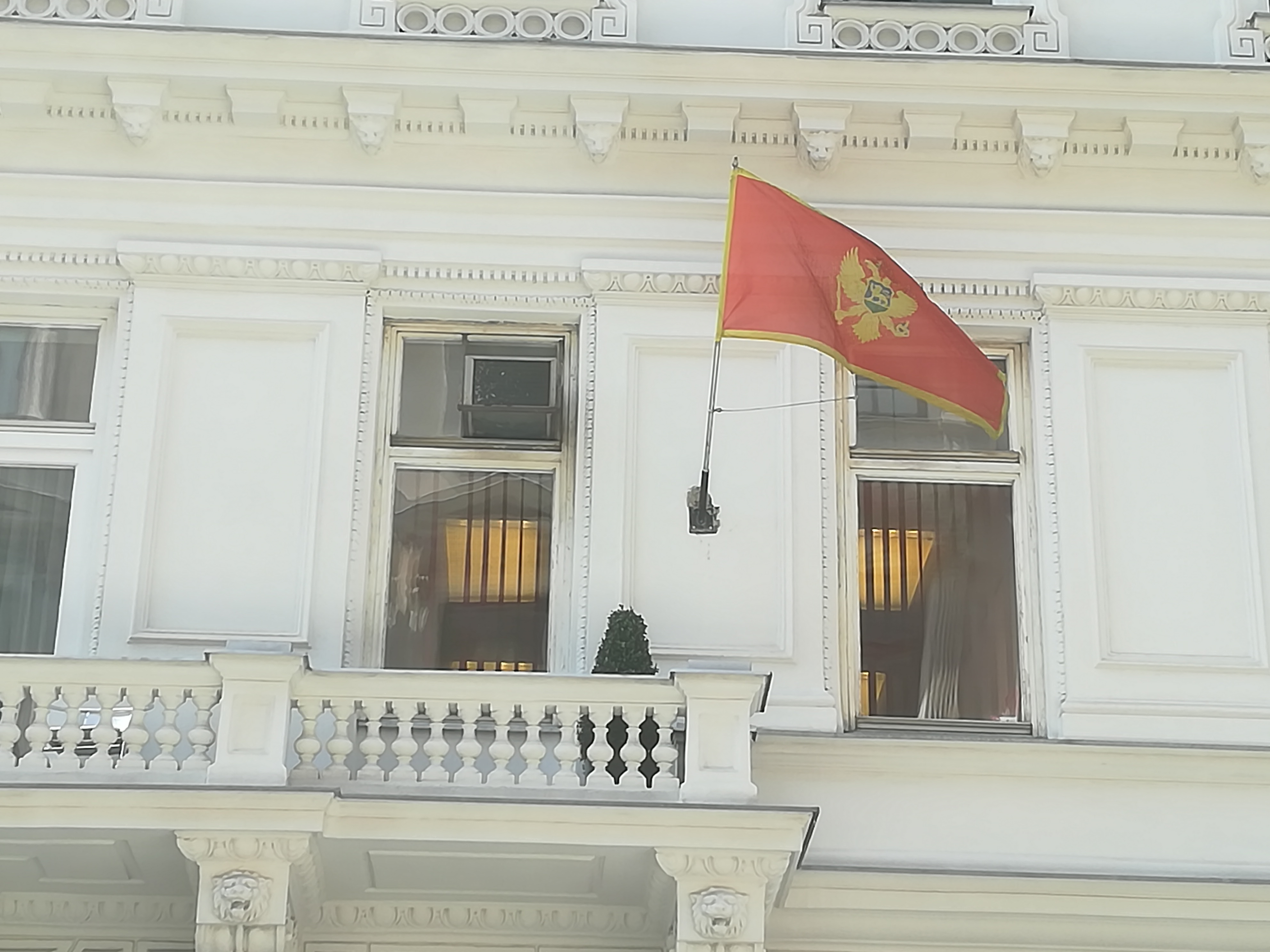
Embassy of Montenegro in Vienna

== See also ==
- Foreign relations of Austria
- Foreign relations of Montenegro
- Austria-NATO relations
- Accession of Montenegro to the EU
- NATO-EU relations
- Austria–Yugoslavia relations
