= Austria–North Macedonia relations =

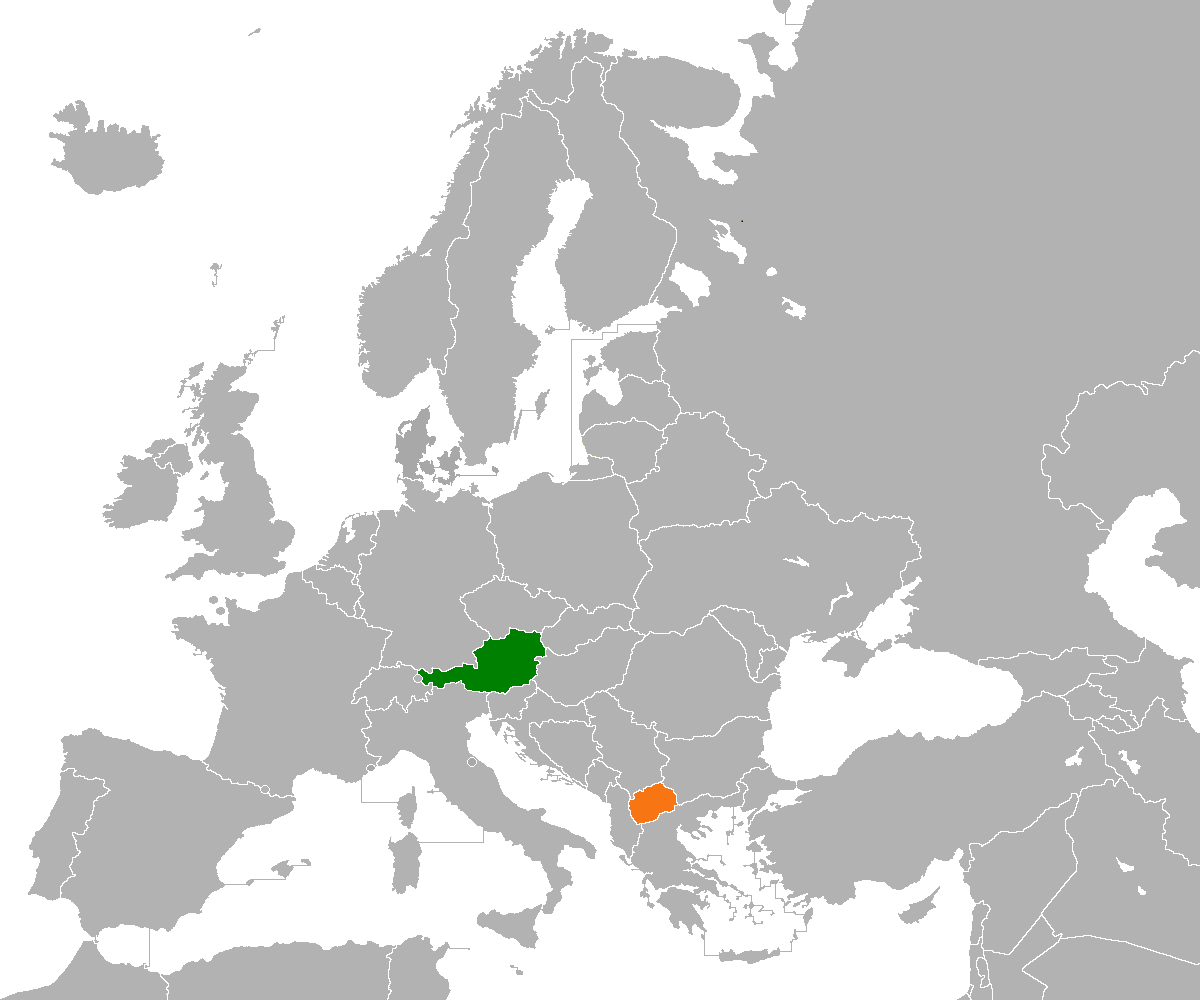

- Austria: North Macedonia

Bilateral relations exist between the Republic of Austria and the Republic of North Macedonia. Diplomatic relations between the two countries were established on 23 December 1994. Austria maintains an embassy in Skopje, while North Macedonia maintains an embassy in Vienna. Austria is an EU member and North Macedonia is an EU candidate.

== Relations ==
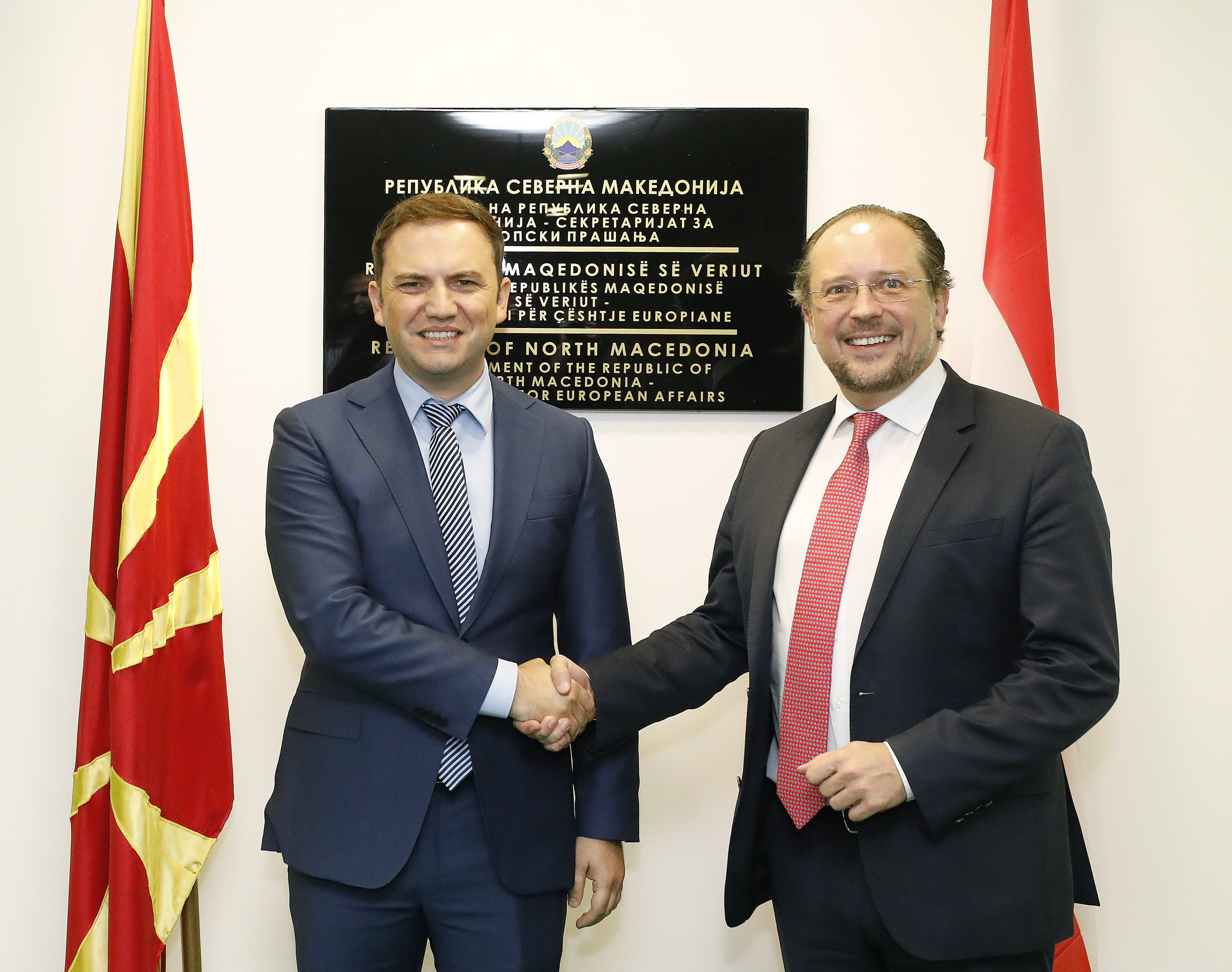
Former Ministers of Foreign Affairs of Austria (Alexander Schallenberg) and North Macedonia (Bujar Osmani)

Austria, being a member state of the European Union, supports North Macedonia's efforts to join the organization. It also supported North Macedonia during the country's visa liberalization process and the European Commission's positive decision in 2009 concerning the start of accession negotiations between the EU and North Macedonia.

== EU ==
Austria joined the EU in 1995. North Macedonia is a candidate country for the EU.

== NATO ==
While North Macedonia became a member of NATO in 2020, Austria has never been a member of NATO.

== Resident diplomatic missions ==
- Austria has an embassy in Skopje.
- North Macedonia has an embassy in Vienna.
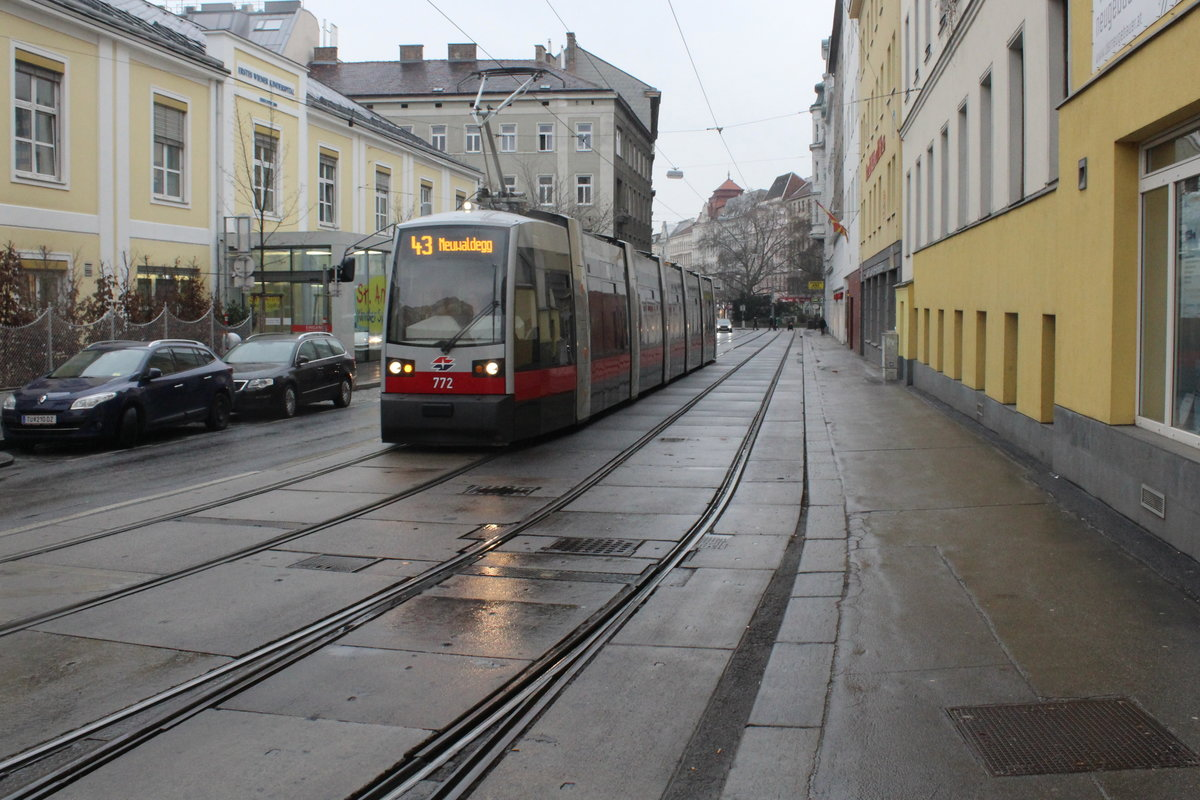
Embassy of North Macedonia in Vienna

== See also ==
- Foreign relations of Austria
- Foreign relations of North Macedonia
- Austria-NATO relations
- Accession of North Macedonia to the EU
- NATO-EU relations
- Macedonians in Austria
- Fire of Skopje 1689
- Austria–Yugoslavia relations
