= Macedonians in Austria =

Macedonians in Austria Македонци во Австрија Mazedonier in Österreich
Total population
- 13,696 - 25,000

Regions with significant populations
- Vienna, Salzburg

Languages
- Primarily Macedonian and German

Religion
- Macedonian Orthodox Church, Sunni Islam

Related ethnic groups
- Macedonians

Macedonians in Austria (Macedonian: Македонци во Австрија, German: Mazedonier in Österreich) refers to the ethnic Macedonian minority residing in the country. Thousands of Macedonians emigrated to Austria during the years of the Yugoslav federation. Many were temporary workers. After the Breakup of Yugoslavia many returned to North Macedonia, but a large proportion of the minority remained. In recent years migration to Austria has increased. By 2001 there were 13,696 Macedonian citizens in Austria, however the Macedonian government puts the figure at 15,000. A community spokesperson however estimated the figure to be over 25,000 people, claiming many Macedonians from other parts of the former Yugoslavia were also present in Austria.

== See also ==
- Austria–North Macedonia relations
- Macedonian people
- Macedonian language
- Republic of North Macedonia
- Macedonian diaspora
- Immigration to Austria
