= Realka High School Building =

School building in Serbia

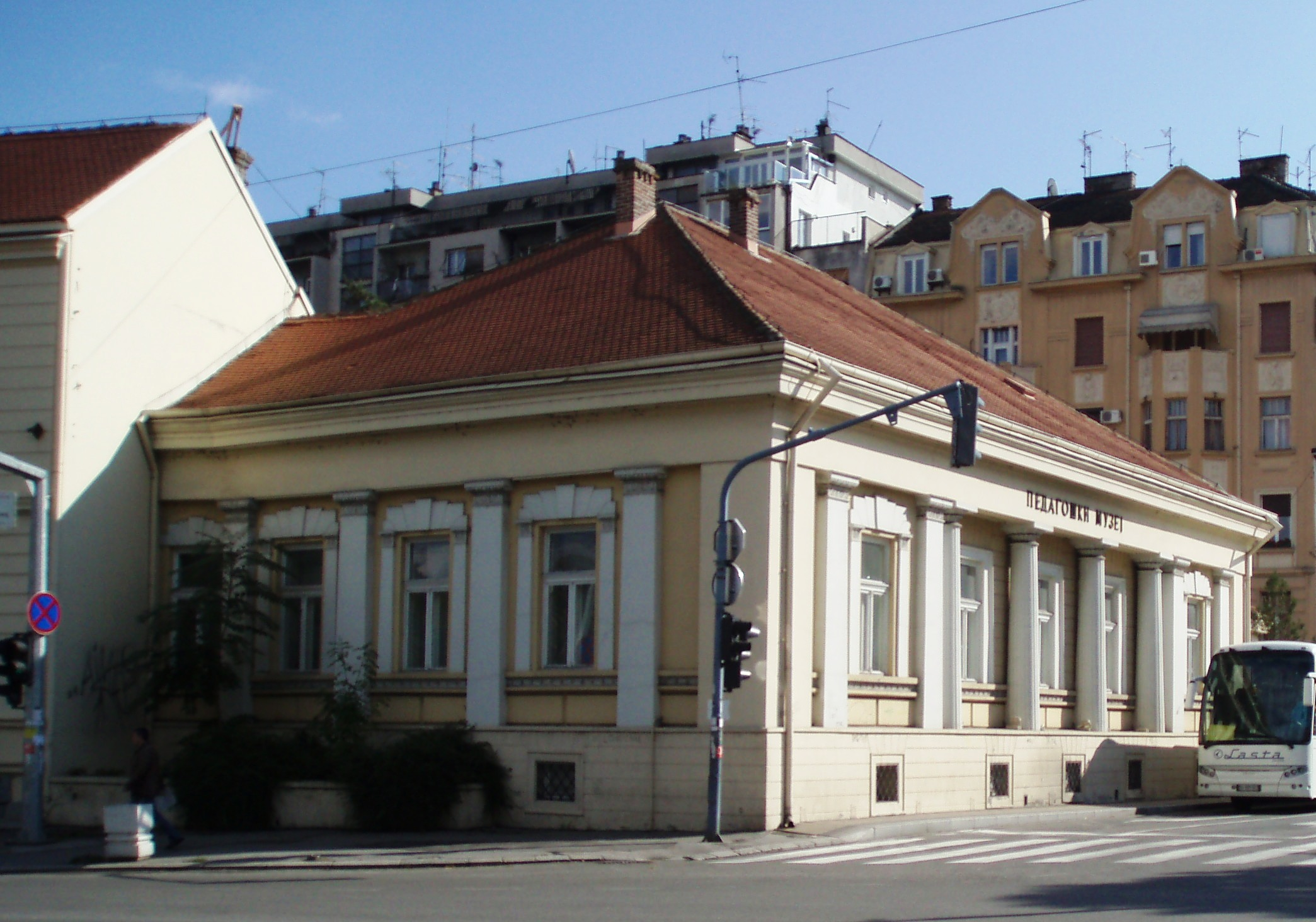
The building

The Realka High School Building is at the corner of 14 Uzun Mirkova Street and Tadeuša Košćuška Street, built between 1835 and 1840 in the style of classicism, most probably after the design of Franc Janke. Its social and historical value lies in the importance it had as the school building which attended and in which taught many important persons of 19th-century Serbia: the teachers Stevan Todorović, Todor Mijušković, Petar Ubavkić, Mihajlo Valtrović, Đorđe Krstić, and students Kosta Glavinić, Milan Kapetanović, Svetozar Jovanović, Milorad Ruvidić, Danilo Vladisavljević, Nikola Nestorović...The building was named after the Belgrade Realka, located within it for a long time. The oldest preserved building in Belgrade was built in European style and is a unique example of classicism.

== History ==
Until 1867, when The First Belgrade Realka was moved in, which remained in the building until the beginning of the Second World War, the building changed its purpose several times. It used to be occupied by the British consulate, it was used by the Serbian Gendarmerie and the Army Headquarters. Today, the Pedagogical Museum of Serbia is situated in this building. Due to its representativeness and its size, the building was in its possession for a short time and then was conceded for a public purpose. The British Consulate was placed in the building for a while. It is mentioned that the British consul general Hodges organized receptions, dinners and balls, the most important of which was on 27 January in 1838, among others attended by the Prince Miloš Obrenović with Princess Ljubica. It was the first time that women, opposed to the customs of that time, sat down with men and played European games. After that, “The Presidency of City Court" (Nadležatelstvo varoškog suda) was placed in the building, and in the school year of 1867–1868, the First Belgrade Realka moves in into the building, and remains there until the Second World War The building kept its educational purpose for many years – a military teaching building, then elementary school "Pera Popović – Aga", and then the "Rade Končar" business school. Today, the Museum of Pedagogy is situated in the building.

The main article: The Museum of Pedagogy (Belgrade)

== Architecture ==
The oldest preserved building in Belgrade was built in European style and is a unique example of classicism. It is a ground-floor building, of rectangular layout, of harmonious proportions based on the system of the golden intersection, shaped in the style of classicism. The facades are horizontally divided into three zones – a plinth, the central wall and a frieze with the cornice, whereas the vertical division of the building was achieved with the use of pilasters and Dorian semi-columns. The architectural plastic elements follow the construction system, and with their ornamentation, they emphasize the part of the building facing the crossroad. The main façade, facing Uzun Mirkova Street has strong contrasts of light-dark, realized by the vertical division of the front facade with pilasters and a sequence of columns that imitate Dorian style, marking the ceremonial room of the house. The facade facing Tadeuša Košćuška Street is decorated with similar ornamented elements, but considering the purpose of the rooms on this side of the building, it did not get the Dorian columns. The south-east facade with the main entrance was decorated in a similar way, whereas the opposite facade from the longer side does not have plastic elements. The proportions of all decorative elements are subjected to the strict geometrical pattern, which gives a tone of seriousness to the building. By its massiveness, good design and the new arrangement of the rooms, this house could serve as the role model for the family buildings which were built later. As one of the few preserved objects from the fourth decade of the 19th century, with its stylistic characteristics, construction system and architectural design, the Realka Building represents the complete discontinuance with the tradition and the transition from the Balkan to contemporary European architecture on the territory of Belgrade. The original condition of the building underwent certain changes over time. In the early 20th century, due to the shortage of school buildings, the new two-storey building was built next to the old one. The new building is organically connected to the old one, but the architecture follows the requirements of the time and the facades bear elements of the Art Nouveau style. The modifications were also done on the facades – at the north-east facade by the change of the openings, and on the south-east by the walling up the squares between two pilasters. Changing the purpose of the building caused certain changes in the interior, first of all in the arrangement and the size of the rooms. The conservatory works on the building were done in 1964–1965, 1972–1975 and 1992–1994. The sanitation of mould and the restoration of the facades were done in 2004.

== Importance ==
As one of the few preserved buildings from the first half of the 19th century and a unique example of classicism in Belgrade, as well as for significance for the development of its school system, the Realka Building has been proclaimed as a cultural property of great importance (The Official Gazette SRS No. 14/79).

== See more ==
- List of cultural monuments in Belgrade
