= Austria–Slovenia relations =

- Austria: Slovenia

Bilateral relations have been maintained between Austria and Slovenia since they were established in 1992. Austria has an embassy in Ljubljana. Slovenia has an embassy in Vienna. Austria–Slovenia state relations are good and harmonious. Both countries are full members of the Council of Europe, European Union and Organization for Security and Co-operation in Europe.

== Resident diplomatic missions ==
- Austria has an embassy in Ljubljana.
- Slovenia has an embassy in Vienna.
- Slovenia has consulate in Klagenfurt.
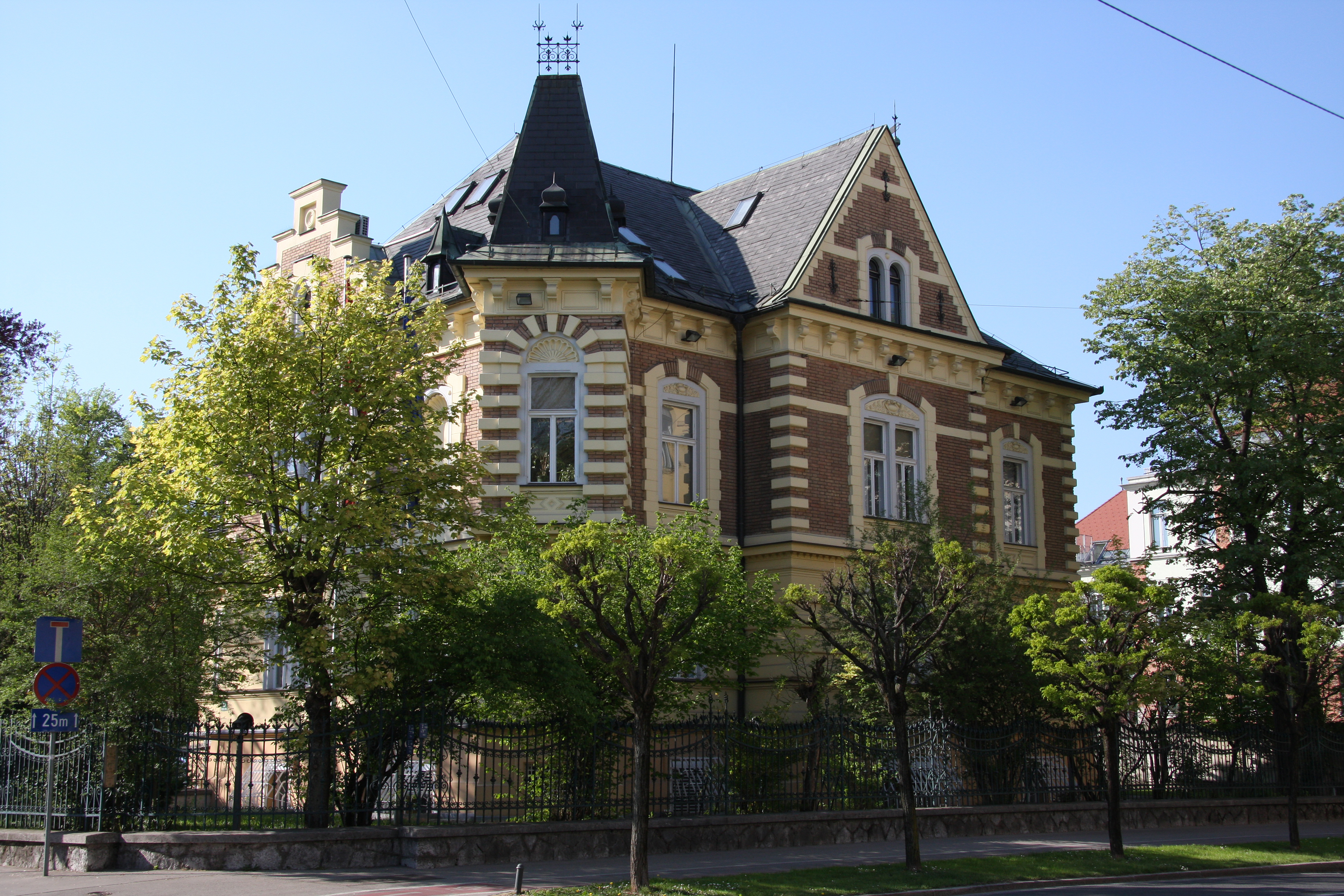
Embassy of Austria in Ljubljana

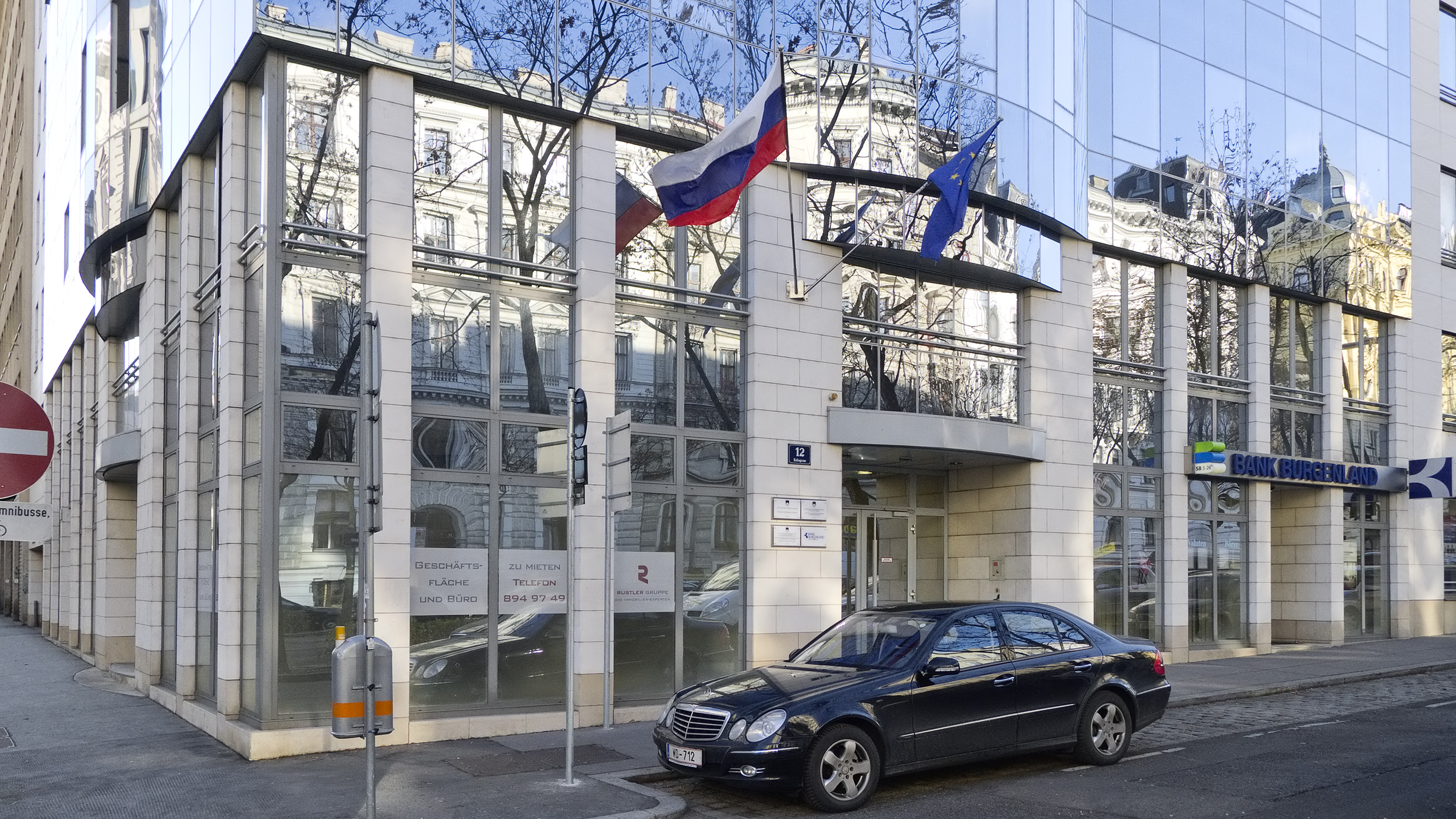
Embassy of Slovenia in Vienna

== See also ==
- Austria–Slovenia border
- Austria–Yugoslavia relations
- Foreign relations of Austria
- Foreign relations of Slovenia
- Austrians in Slovenia
- Slovenes of Austria
