= Austria–Yugoslavia relations =

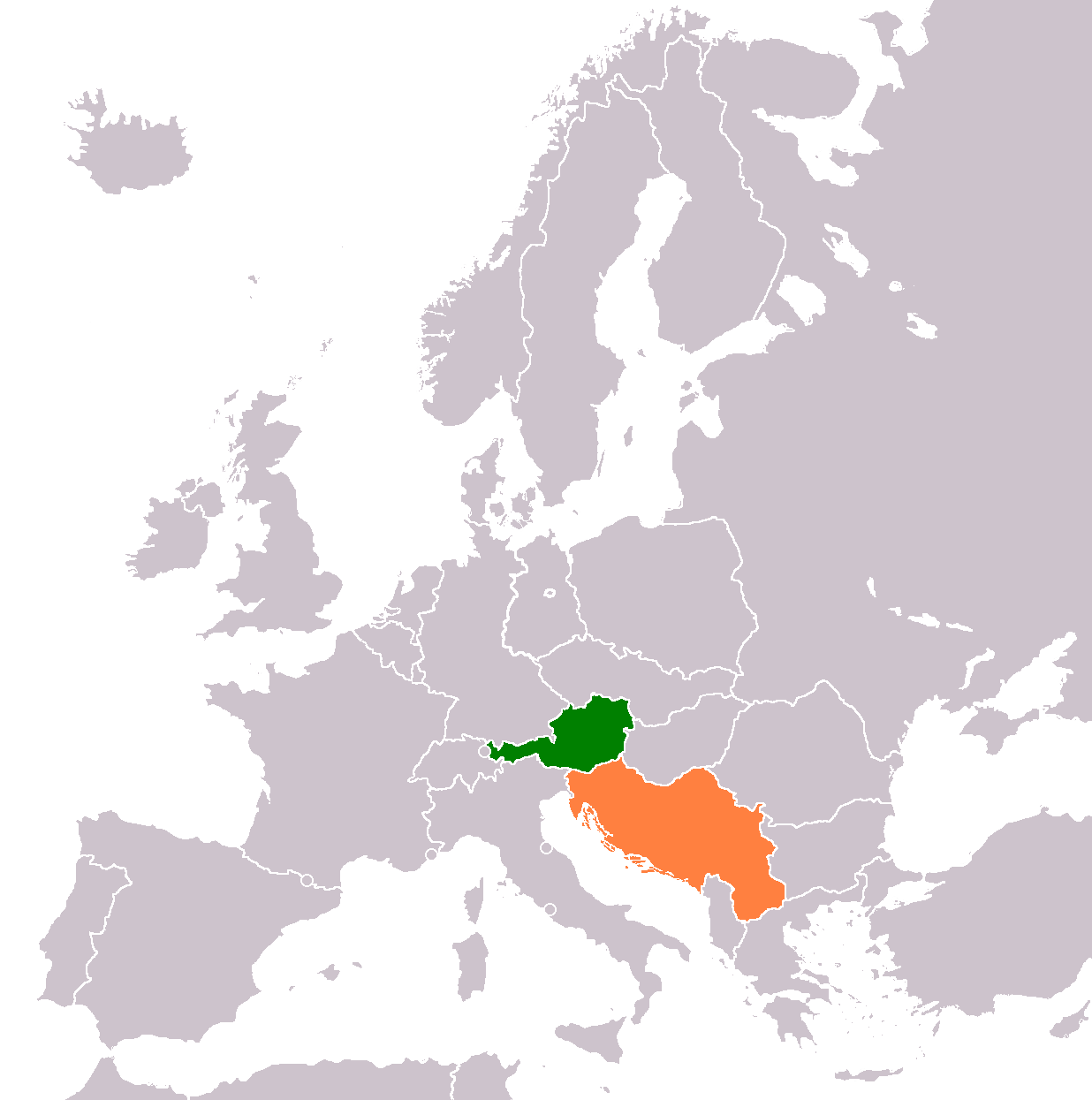

- Austria: Yugoslavia

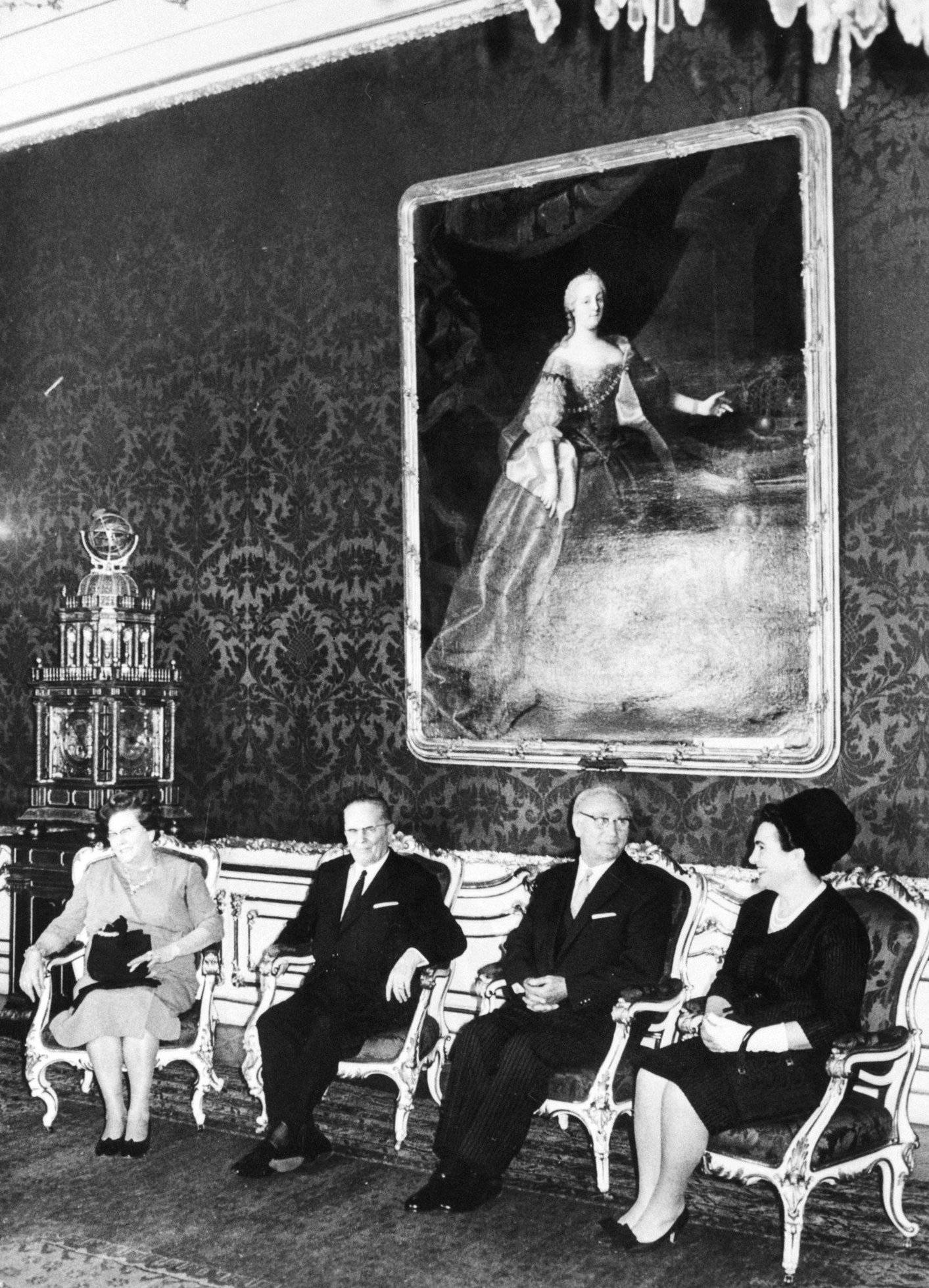
Josip Broz Tito and Jovanka Broz in Vienna in 1967

Austria–Yugoslavia relations (German: Österreichisch-Jugoslawien-Beziehungen; Serbo-Croatian: Austrijsko-jugoslavenski odnosi, Аустријско-југословенски односи; Slovene: Avstrijsko-jugoslovanski odnosi; Macedonian: Односите Австрија-Југославија) were historical foreign relations between Austria and now broken up Yugoslavia. Both countries were created following the dissolution of Austria-Hungary in 1918. First Austrian Republic was a successor state of the empire while Yugoslavia was created after the unification of pre-World War I Kingdom of Serbia with the State of Slovenes, Croats and Serbs (former South Slavic parts of the Austria-Hungary). In the days before this unification Kingdom of Serbia merged with the Banat, Bačka and Baranja and the Kingdom of Montenegro. During the interwar period of European history relations between the First Austrian Republic and the Kingdom of Yugoslavia were marked by the Austro-Slovene conflict in Carinthia, 1920 Carinthian plebiscite, 1920 establishment of pro-status quo Little Entente, 1934 Rome Protocols between revanchist Austria, Hungary and Fascist Italy and 1938 Anschluss.

From the Anschluss to the end of World War II in 1945, Austria was under National Socialism and part of Nazi Germany. World War II in Yugoslavia started on 6 April 1941 and led to country's partition and initiation of the prolonged guerrilla liberation war fought against the Axis and their locally established puppet regimes.

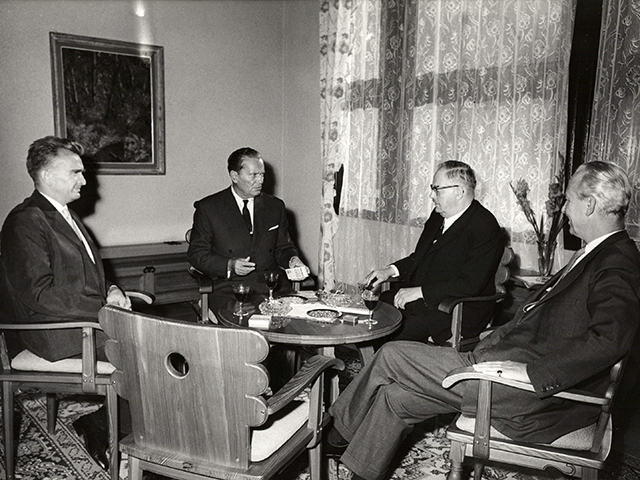
Austrian Economic Chamber delegation meeting with the President of Yugoslavia Josip Broz Tito.

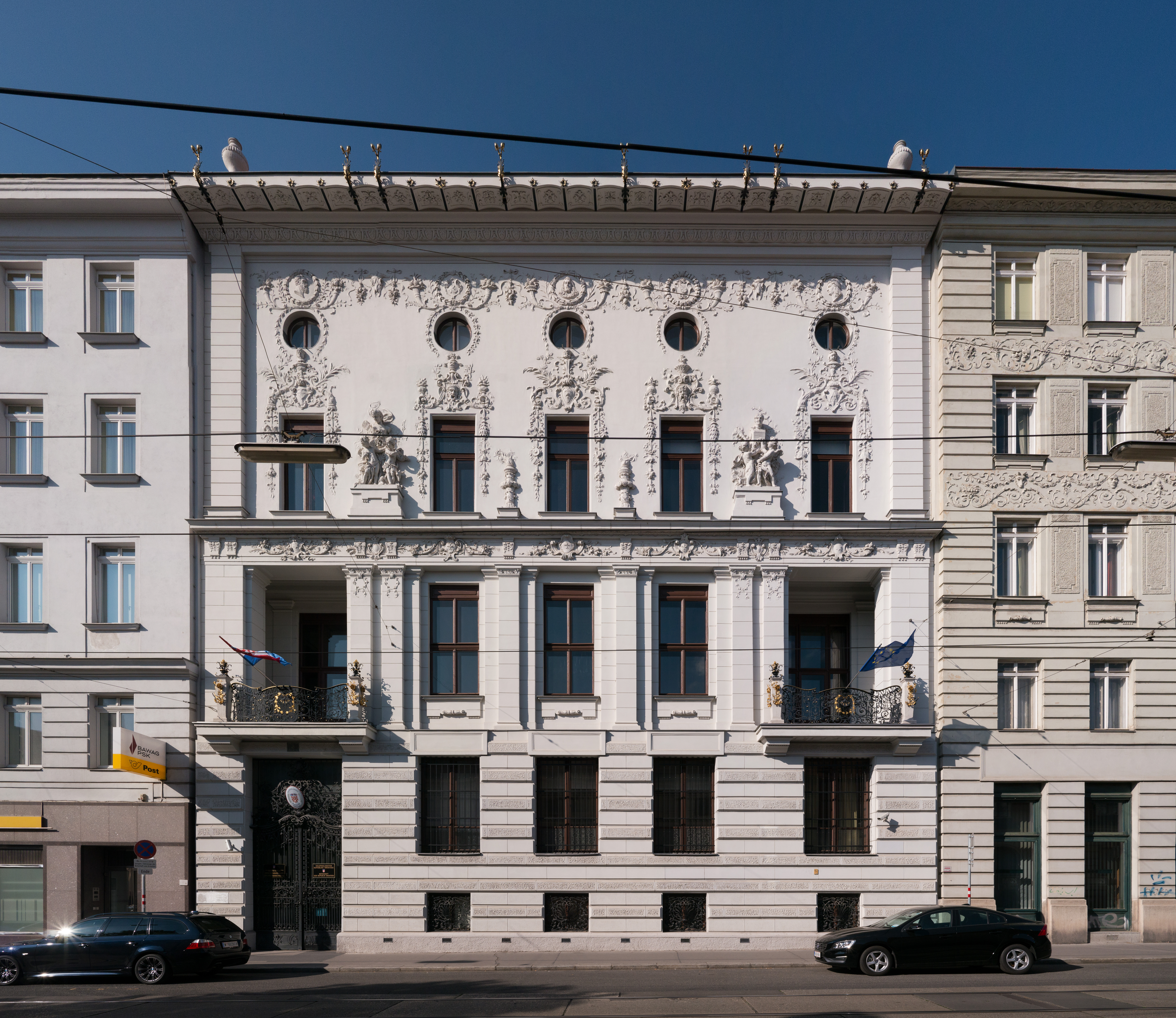
Embassy of Yugoslavia in Vienna (today Embassy of Croatia)

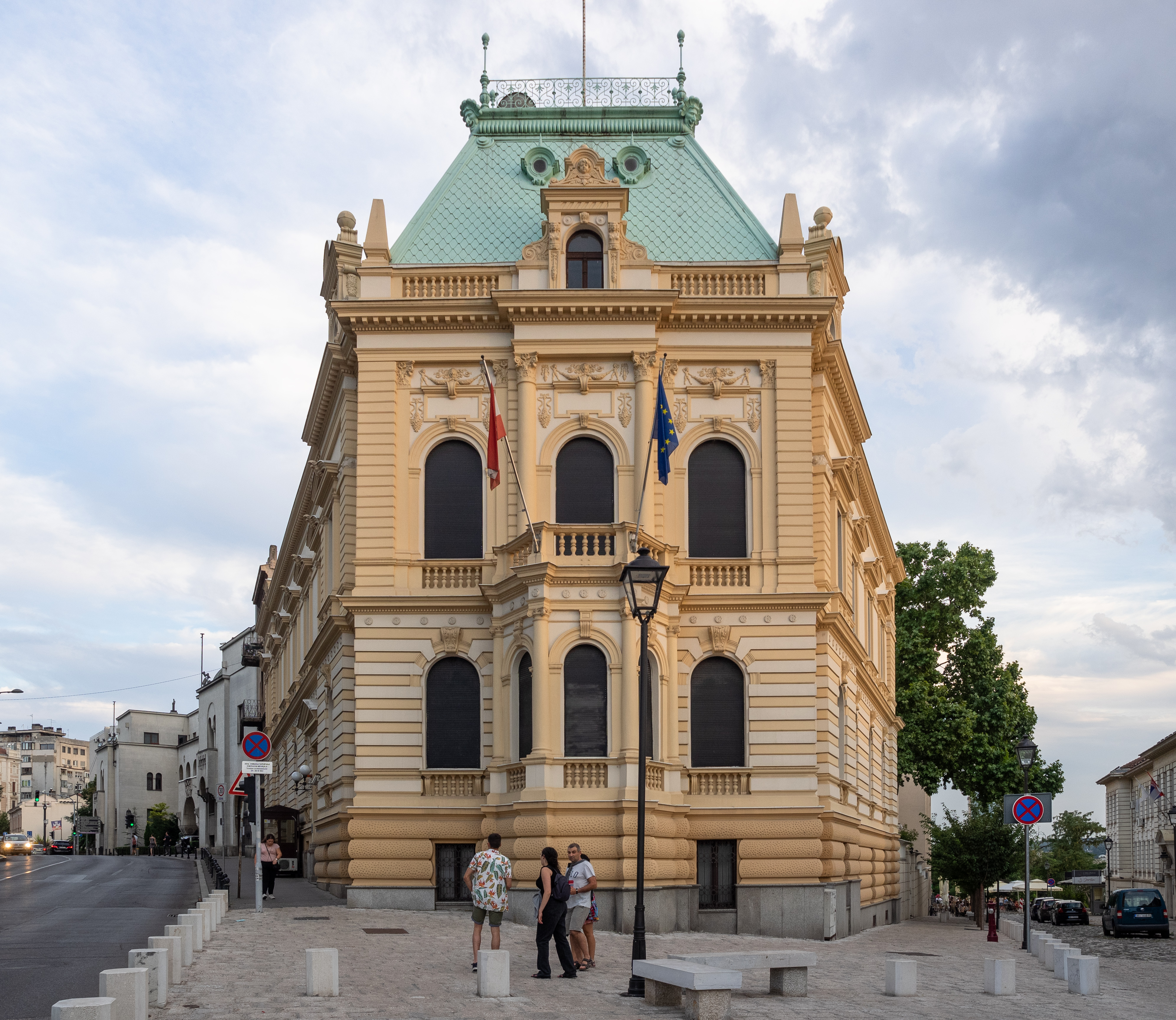
Embassy of Austria in Belgrade (since 1955)

After the end of the war Austria was under the Allied occupation while Yugoslavia was reunited under the name of the Federal People's Republic of Yugoslavia. Once it was signed by Austria and the four occupying powers (France, Soviet Union, United Kingdom and United States) the Austrian State Treaty was signed also by neighboring Yugoslavia. Austria, as a neutral country, and post 1948 Tito–Stalin split Yugoslavia as a non-aligned country, collaborated closely on building bridges in the Cold War Europe, particularly within the framework of the Conference on Security and Co-operation in Europe (modern day OSCE). The formal relationship further developed with the establishment of the Alps-Adriatic Working Group in 1978. In 1989, together with Hungary and Italy, Austria and Yugoslavia were the founding members of the Central European Initiative. While at the initial stages of the Yugoslav crisis Austria was still not a member state of the emerging European Union, the country still was a vocal advocate of the right of self-determination both for the Socialist Republic of Slovenia and the Socialist Republic of Croatia. Yugoslavia national football team played its last international match on 13 November 1991 in the UEFA Euro 1992 qualifying against the Austria national football team and won it with the result of 2:0.

== See also ==
- Austria–Bosnia and Herzegovina relations
- Austria–Croatia relations
- Austria–Montenegro relations
- Austria–North Macedonia relations
- Austria–Serbia relations
- Austria–Slovenia relations
  - Views on Enlargement of NATO in Austria, Croatia and Serbia
- Group of Nine
- 1995 enlargement of the European Union
- Austro-Hungarian occupation of Serbia
- Czech Corridor and Czechoslovakia–Yugoslavia relations
- Germans of Yugoslavia
- Burgenland Croats
- Carinthian Slovenes
- Serbs in Austria
- 2015 Western Balkans Summit, Vienna
- Death and state funeral of Josip Broz Tito
- Yugoslavia at the 1964 Winter Olympics
- Yugoslavia at the 1976 Winter Olympics
- Austria at the 1984 Winter Olympics
- Yugoslavia in the Eurovision Song Contest 1967
- Austria in the Eurovision Song Contest 1990
- Austria–Soviet Union relations
