= Austria–Serbia relations =

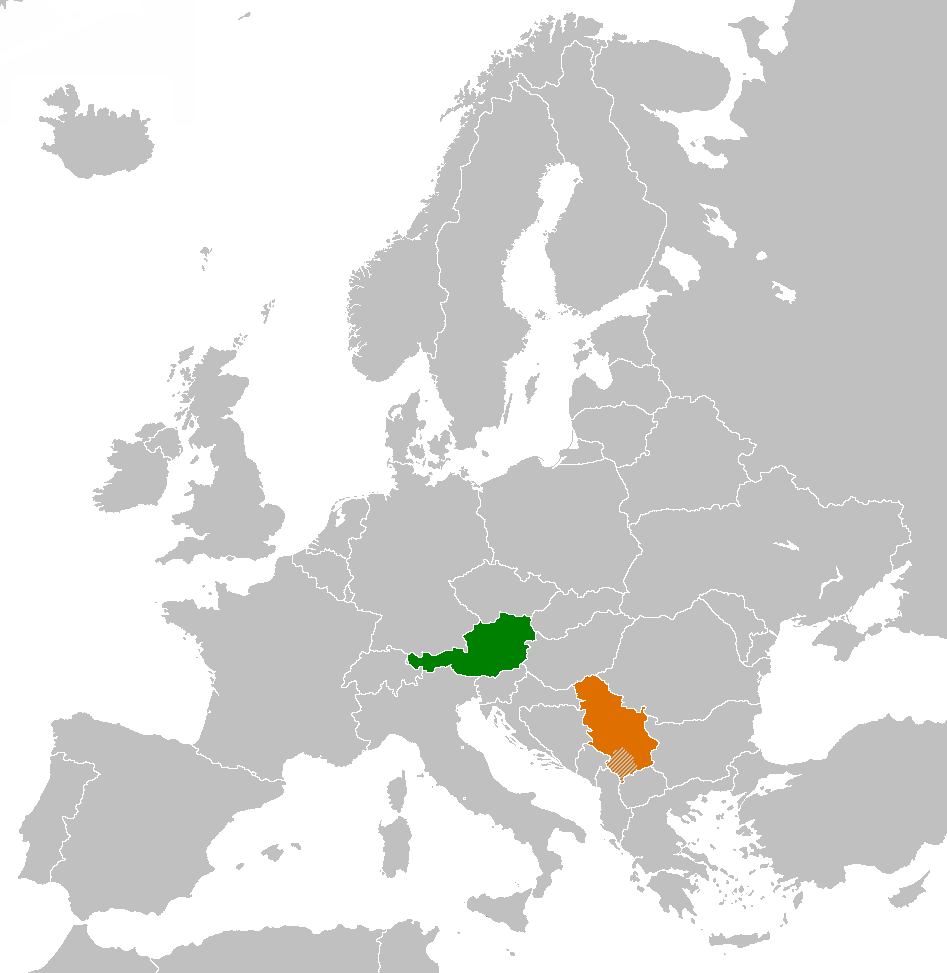
- Austria: Serbia

Austria and Serbia maintain diplomatic relations established in 1874 between the Austria-Hungary and the Principality of Serbia. From 1918 to 2006, Austria (as a successor state of the Austria-Hungary) maintained relations with the Kingdom of Yugoslavia, the Socialist Federal Republic of Yugoslavia (SFRY), and the Federal Republic of Yugoslavia (FRY) (later Serbia and Montenegro), of which Serbia is considered shared (SFRY) or sole (FRY) legal successor.

== History ==
The history of relations between the two countries goes back to end of the Middle Ages, migration of ethnic Serbs towards Austrian lands was caused by expansion of the Ottoman Empire. Exiled members of Serbian noble families were welcomed by Habsburg rulers, who granted them new possessions. In 1479, emperor Friedrich III granted castle Weitensfeld in Carinthia to exiled members of Branković dynasty of Serbia.

During the period of Ottoman–Habsburg wars from 16th to 18th century, Austrian policy towards Serbs was marked by special interests, related to complex political situation in various regions of the expanding Habsburg monarchy. Emperor Leopold I issued several charters (1690, 1691, 1695) to Eastern Orthodox Serbs, who sided with Habsburgs during the Vienna War (1683-1699), granting them religious freedom in the Habsburg Empire.

Serbian Orthodox patriarch Arsenije III visited Vienna on several occasions, and died there in 1706. Serbian Orthodox metropolitan Isaija Đaković, who visited Austrian capital on several occasions since 1690, also died in Vienna, in 1708. Later Serbian Orthodox metropolitans Isaija Antonović (d. 1749) and Mojsije Putnik (d. 1790) also died i Vienna.

During the 18th and 19th century, new communities of ethnic Serbs were developing in major Austrian cities, consisting mainly of merchants, officers and students, who were under the spiritual jurisdiction of the Serbian Orthodox Metropolitanate of Karlovci. Among prominent Serbs who came to live permanently in the imperial capital were Atanasije Dimitrijević Sekereš (d. 1794 in Vienna), philologist Vuk Karadžić (since 1813, until his death in 1864) and various other officials, merchants and representatives of Serbian intelligentsia.

The Great Turkish War, Habsburg-occupied Serbia (1686–91) and Great Serb Migrations (formation of Military Frontier and building of Petrovaradin Fortress), to the era when the Kingdom of Serbia (1718–1739) had been a province of the Habsburg monarchy, and the last Austro-Turkish War (1787–91) at the time of Habsburg-occupied Serbia (1788–92).

Foreign relations, as such, date from the proclamation of the Austrian Empire in 1804 and the formation in 1817 of the Principality of Serbia, an autonomous state within the Ottoman Empire. The Habsburg recognized the independence of Serbia and established diplomatic relations in 1874, supported by the Treaty of Berlin (1878).

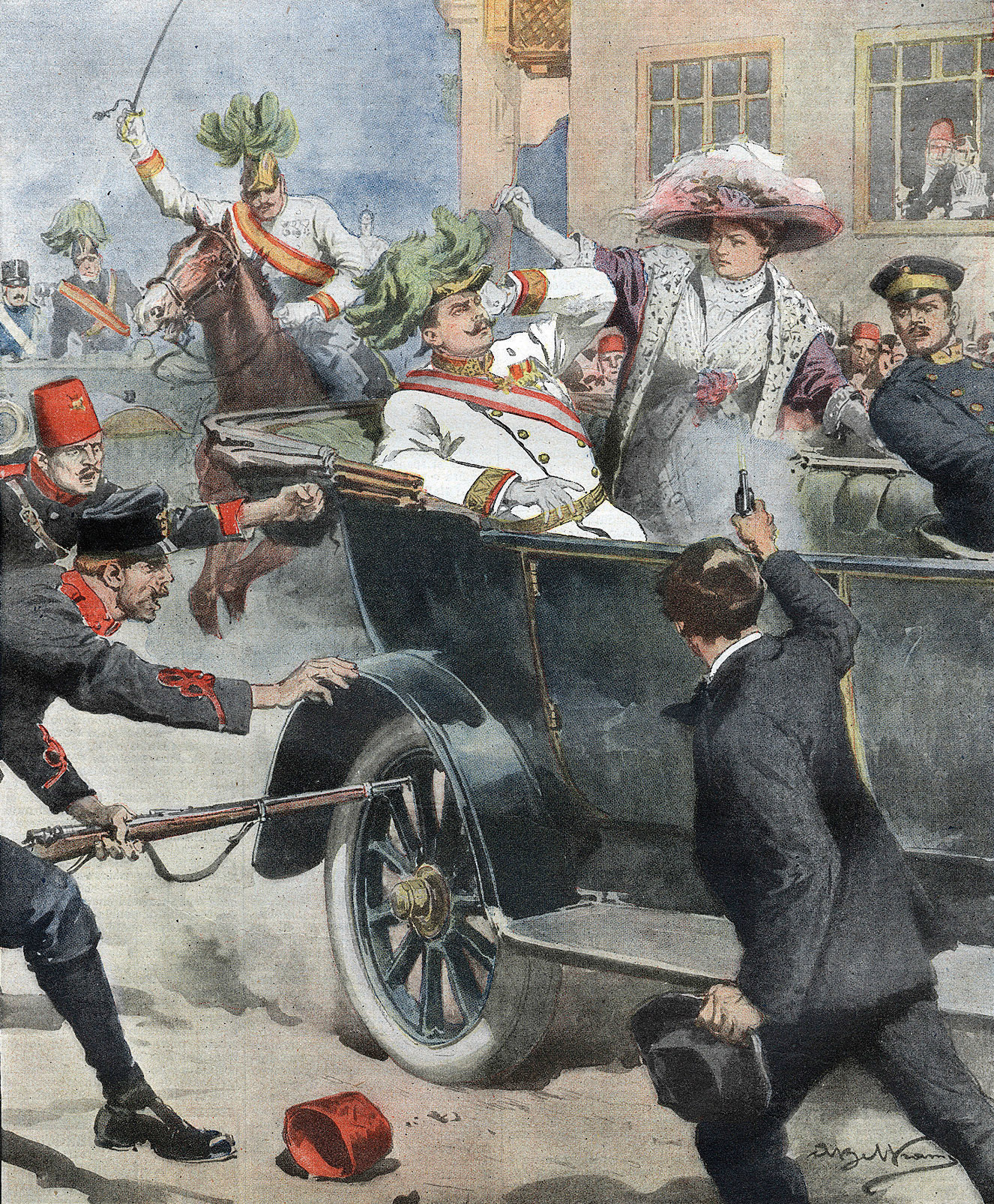
Archduke Franz Ferdinand and his wife Sophie were assassinated by Gavrilo Princip (Domenica del Corriere, 12 July 1914)

Hungarian suppression of Serbian revolts during the 1848 Revolutions were not opposed by the Habsburg rulers. Serbian claims were not recognized by Hungary was eventually placated with the Austro-Hungarian Compromise of 1867, further angering Serbian nationalists. One notable flare-up between the two countries was the 1906-1909 economic conflict known as the Pig War followed with the diplomatic and military crisis over the Austrian annexation of Bosnia which contributed to inflame pan-Serb sentiment and helped lay the grounds for World War I. Ultimately, the tensions between the two countries could not withstand the strain of the Assassination of the Austrian Archduke, by a young Bosnian Serb, an opportunity for the Austro-Hungarian government to solve Slav nationalism.

Following the July Crisis, Austro-Hungary launched three unsuccessful offensives to punish Serbia for allegedly supporting the assassins. In October 1915 with the help of German and Bulgarian forces, Serbia was finally conquered and divided into separate occupation zones. The northern three-quarters of Serbia was placed under a harsh Austro-Hungarian occupational regime until its liberation by allied forces in 1918.

The First World War eventually destroyed the Austro-Hungarian Empire, leaving a shrunken First Austrian Republic as a rump state. Serbia annexed much of the former Austrian holdings in the Balkans to become the Kingdom of Serbs, Croats and Slovenes, later the Kingdom of Yugoslavia. Austria was eventually annexed by Germany in 1938, ending its separate foreign relations. During World War II, Serbian prisoners of war were among Allied POWs held in the Stalag XVII-A, Stalag XVII-B, Stalag XVIII-A, Stalag XVIII-B, Stalag 317/XVIII-C and Stalag 398 German POW camps and forced labour subcamps in German-annexed Austria.

A number of Serb medical doctors and veterinarians got educated in Austria during the interwar period and earlier as well.

== Economic relations ==
Trade between two countries amounted to $1.87 billion in 2023; Austria's merchandise export to Serbia were over $1 billion; Serbian exports were standing at roughly $359 million.

Austria is one of a leading foreign investors in Serbia. Austrian companies invested in Serbia largely in the financial sector: there are two Austrian banks (Raiffeisen and Erste) and two insurance companies (Wiener Stadtische and Grawe) operating on Serbian market. Austrian manufacturing companies present in Serbia include Wienerberger (roof-tiles manufacturing plant in Kanjiža), Palfinger (machinery manufacturing plant in Niš), Swarovski (machinery manufacturing plant in Subotica), Zumtobel (lightning manufacturing plant in Niš), Porr (building materials plant in Svilajnac), and Rauch (beverages plant in Koceljeva). OMV has the retail network of 63 filling stations in Serbia.

== Immigration from Serbia ==
Serbia-born population in Austria, numbering 141,822 according to data from the 2022 census, forms one of the largest foreign-born groups in Austria. The estimated number of people with Serbian ancestry is around 300,000. They are heavily concentrated in Vienna, home to 98,940 people of Serb ancestry, making it the largest community in Serb diaspora.

== Resident diplomatic missions ==
- Serbia has an embassy in Vienna and a consulate general in Salzburg.
- Austria has an embassy in Belgrade and a consulate general in Niš.
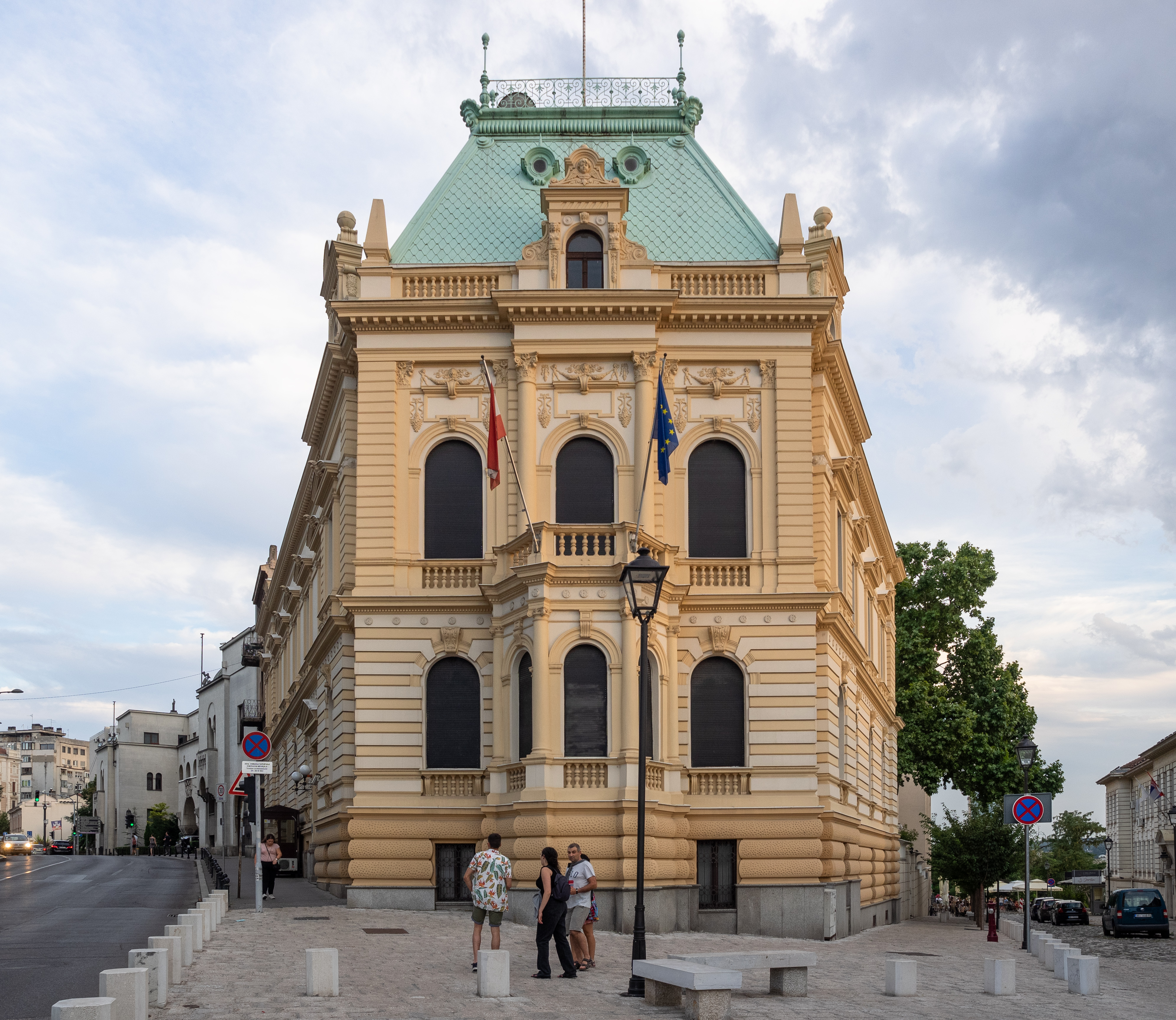
Embassy of Austria in Belgrade

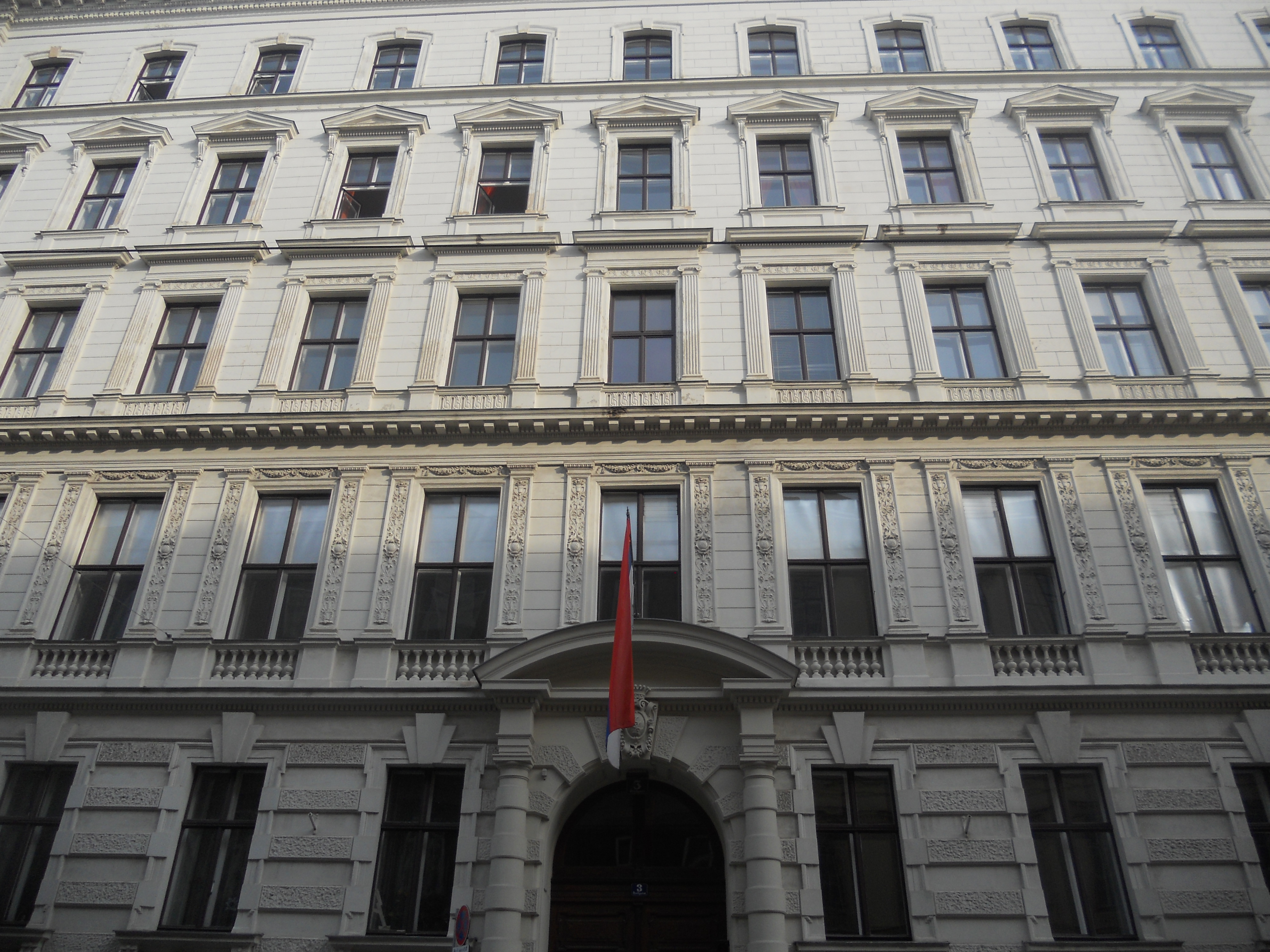
Embassy of Serbia in Vienna

== See also ==
- Foreign relations of Austria
- Foreign relations of Serbia
- Austria–Yugoslavia relations

== Sources ==
- Ćirković, Sima (2004). The Serbs. Malden: Blackwell Publishing. ISBN 9781405142915.
- Jireček, Constantin (1918). Geschichte der Serben. Vol. 2. Gotha: Perthes.
- Stiegnitz, Peter; Kosinski, Danuta (1990). Religions in Austria. Vienna: Federal Press Service.
- Točanac-Radović, Isidora (2022). "The Great Migration of Serbs and the Question of the Serbian Ethnic and Religious Community in the Habsburg Monarchy". Migrations in the Slavic Cultural Space: From the Middle Ages to the Present Day. Łódź: Łódź University Press. pp. 15–27.
- Točanac-Radović, Isidora (2025). "Natio nostra Illyrico-Rasciana seu Serviana: The Creation of a Privileged Identity of Serbs in the Habsburg Monarchy" (PDF). Concepts of Nationalism and Patriotism in Serbian Political Discourse: Medieval, Modern, Contemporary. Belgrade: Faculty of Philosophy. pp. 83–87.
