= Minority languages of Austria =

Languages of Austria
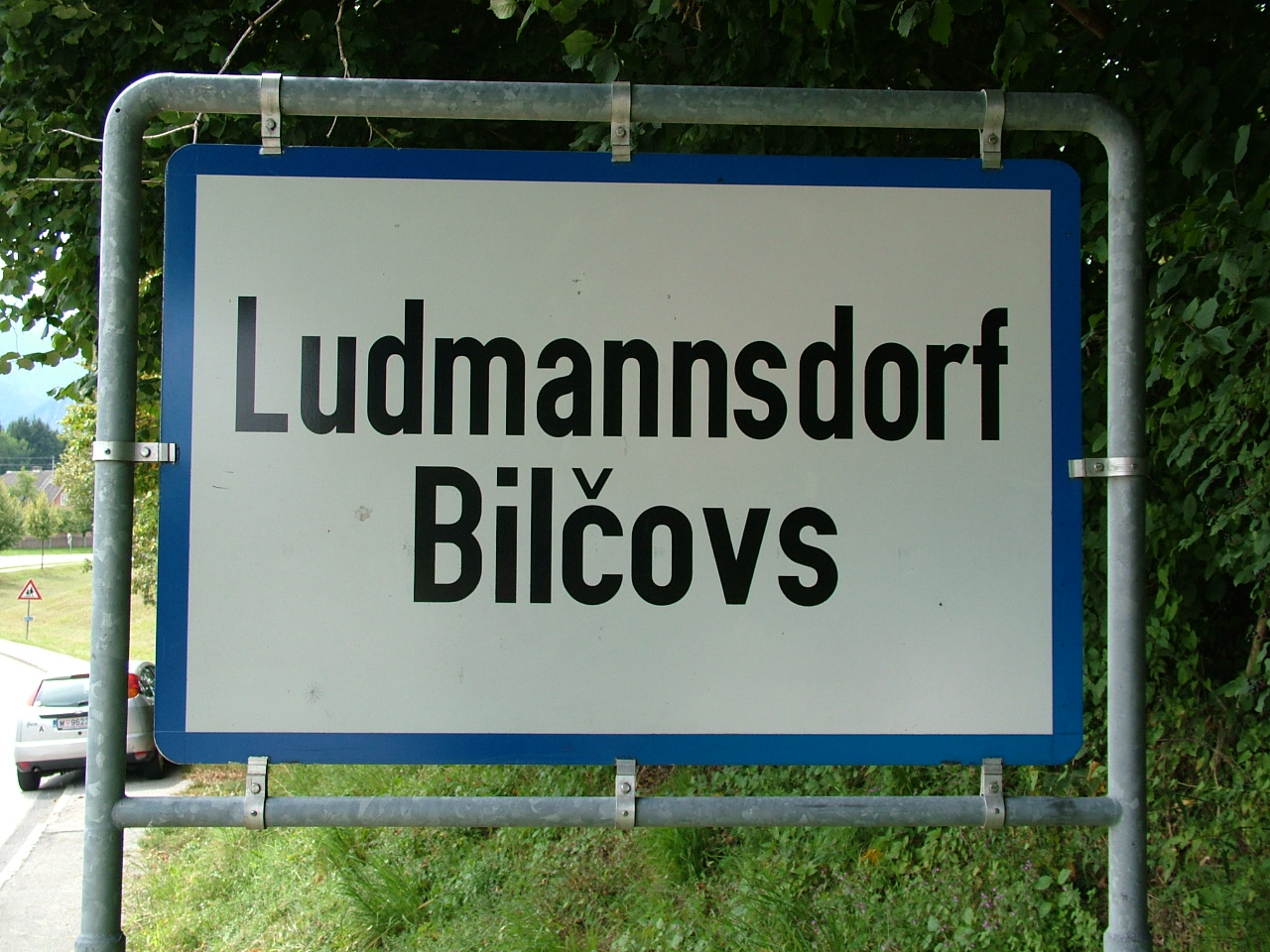
- A bilingual sign in Ludmannsdorf
- Minority: Croatian; Czech; Hungarian; Romany; Slovak; Slovene

Minority languages are spoken in a number of autochthonous settlements in Austria. These are:

- Croatian and Romany in Burgenland,
- Czech and Slovak in Vienna,
- Hungarian in Burgenland and Vienna, and
- Slovene in Carinthia and Styria.

The Austrian Federal Constitution calls for the respect and promotion of ethnic groups resident in Austria and a special set of rights for Austrian Croats, Czechs, Hungarians, Romani, Slovaks and Slovenes was established under the terms of the Ethnic Group Act (German: Volksgruppengesetz) 1976. The rights of Croats and Slovenes are also set forth in the Austrian State Treaty. Austria signed the European Charter for Regional or Minority Languages on 5 November 1992 and application of the charter became effective under international law on 1 October 2001.

In the view of the representatives of the speakers of minority languages, however, the federal laws concerning regional or minority languages, as well as the Austrian application of the European Charter for Regional or Minority Languages, remain too restrictive.

The minority rights of Slovenes and Croats are often not fully realized and do not guarantee all the rights to which these minorities are entitled under the Austrian State Treaty. The Republic of Austria is often issued warnings by the EU for these violations.

== Official Minority Languages ==
=== Croatian ===
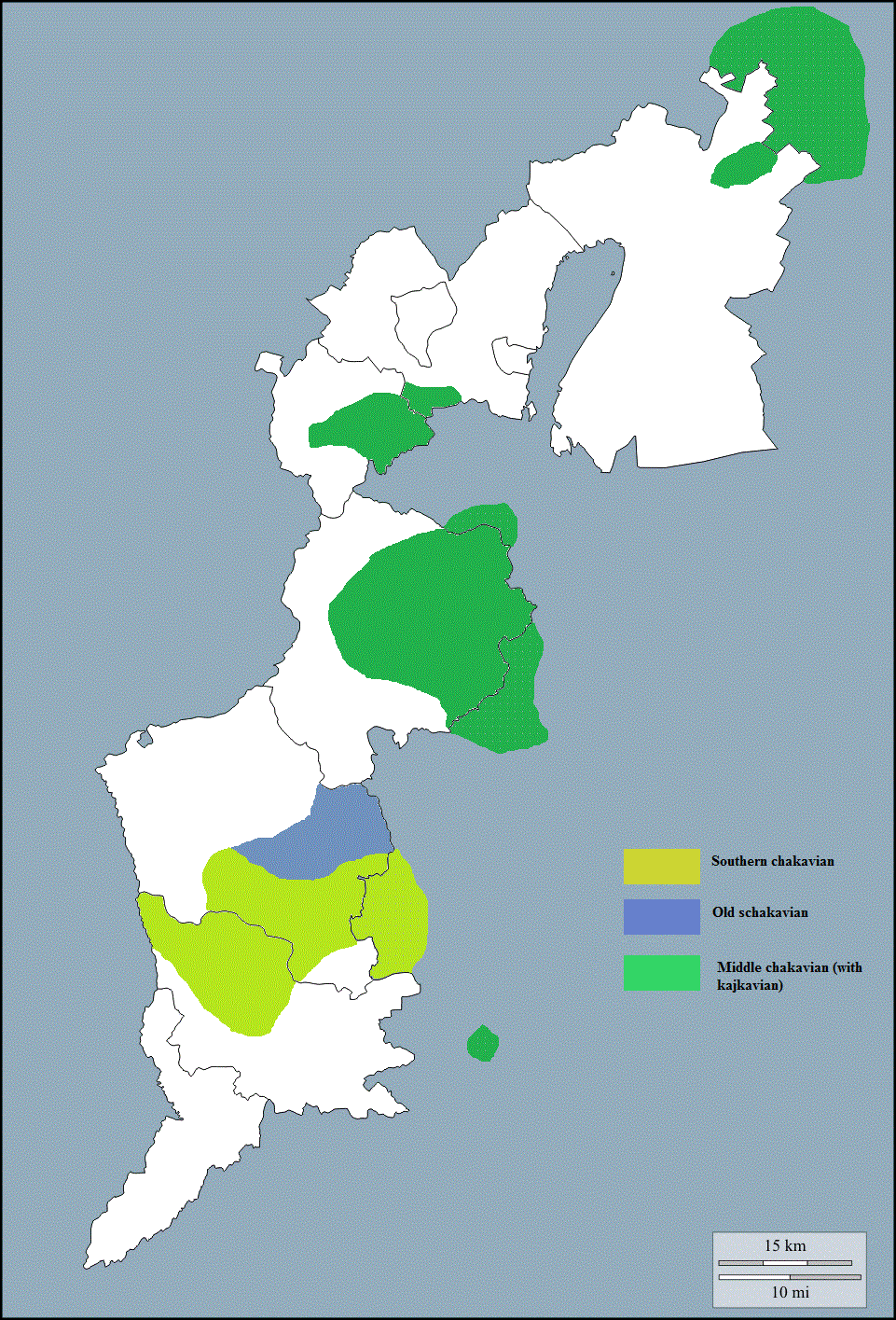
Dialects of Burgenland Croats by J. Lisac

A group of Chakavian dialects known as Burgenland Croatian are traditionally spoken by the Burgenland Croats in the Austrian state of Burgenland, where it has official recognition as a minority language. The origin lies in the aftermath of the Ottoman occupation of Lika, Krbava, Kordun, Banovina, Moslavina and Western Bosnia during the course of the Turkish wars (1533–1584). During this time and after, several waves of refugees arrived in the southeastern borderlands of Austria, where were granted land and independent ecclesiastical rights by the Austrian King Ferdinand I. Following the dissolution of the Austro-Hungarian monarchy in 1918, the area in which the Burgenland Croats lived was divided between Austria, Czechoslovakia and Hungary. After 1921, most of these areas became part of Austria, which established a new province of Burgenland, which later gave the Burgenland identifier to these Croats. In 1922, Austria founded the Apostolic administration of Burgenland, and began to abolish bilingual schools, by introducing the German language to all primary schools. This process was temporarily stopped after the adoption of The National Education Act, which allowed for Croatian-language elementary schools. After Hitler annexed Austria in 1938, this law was abolished. In 1955, the Austrian State Treaty was signed. It gave permission to the Burgenland Croats to use Croatian in education, judiciary, and public administration. With the adoption of the Law on National Minorities in 1976, use of Croatian in public life became limited. After a constitutional complaint was heeded in 1987, parts of the law were changed and Croatian was introduced as an official language in 6 out of 7 districts of Burgenland. As of 2001 there were 19,412 speakers, according to official reports. Due to the ongoing process of urbanization and the poor economic situation in many parts of Burgenland, many speakers of Burgenland Croatian varieties also live in Vienna and Graz.

Like the Croatian standard language, Burgenland Croatian combines features from the Chakavian, Shtokavian and Kajkavian dialects. But unlike standard Croatian, which is mostly based on the most widespread Shtokavian dialect, the Burgenland variant of Croatian is based on the Chakavian dialect. Burgenland Croatian includes phrases no longer used in standard Croatian, as well as certain phrases and words taken from German and Hungarian. Names are often written according to Hungarian orthography, due to the Magyarisation policies during the late 19th and early 20th centuries. Almost all Burgenland Croats are fluent in German.

=== Slovene ===
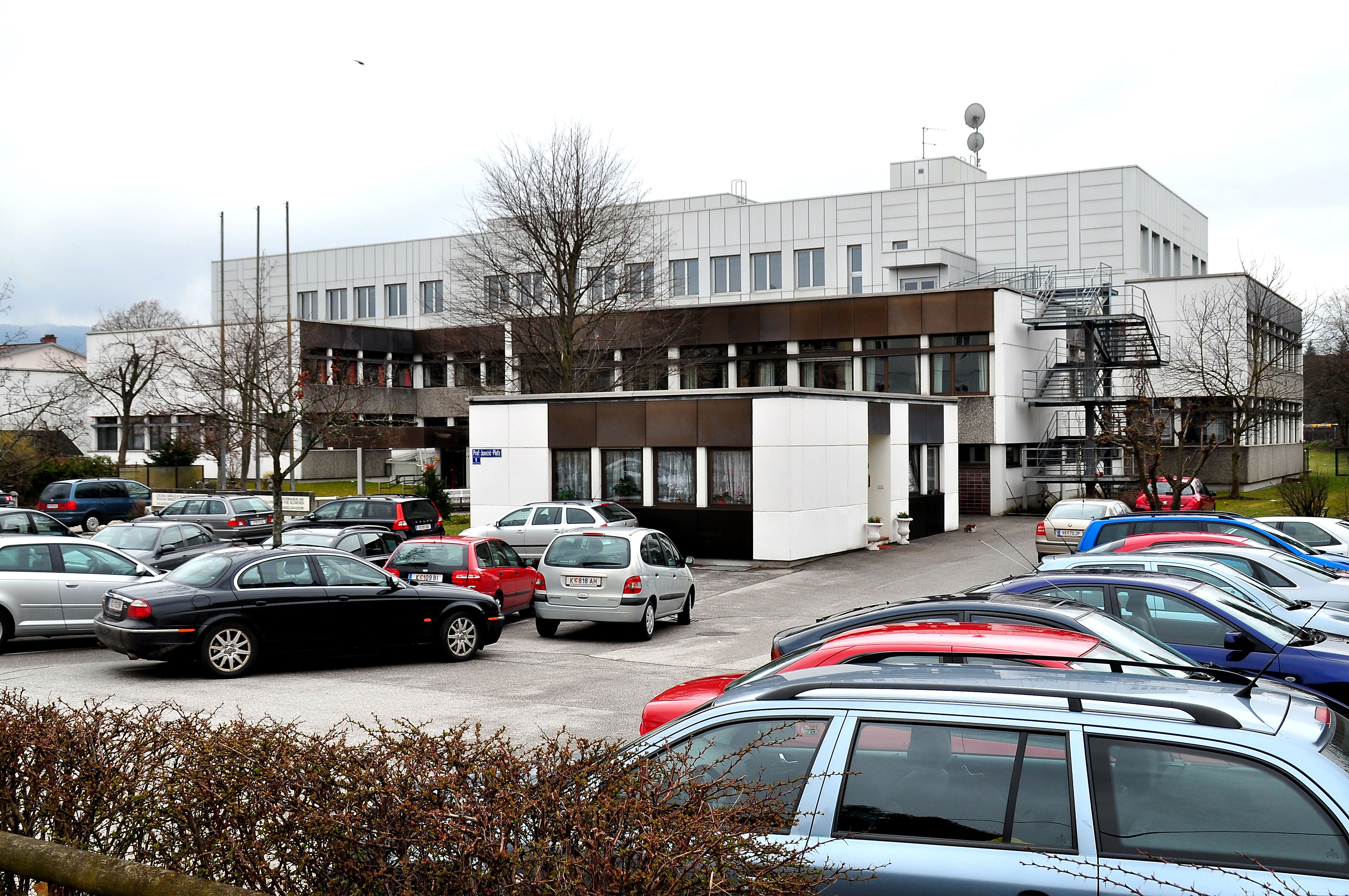
Federal Gymnasium for Slovenes

The Slovene-speaking community in Austria has traditionally inhabited a strip of territory in Austrian states of Carinthia and Styria. A significantly larger share of the community lives in Carinthia. The entire community is bilingual in German as well, and the local Slovene dialect is not entirely the same as standard Slovene. The Carinthian group of Slovene dialects extends beyond the present borders of Carinthia. Carinthian Slovene dialects are spoken throughout Slovenian Carinthia and extend into the Pohorje Mountains and along the upper Drava Valley in Slovenian Styria. Additionally, a Carinthian Slovene dialect is spoken in the Upper Carniolan locality of Rateče in Slovenia (close to the border with Italy), whereas in the nearby town of Kranjska Gora, a transitional dialect between Carinthian and Upper Carniolan is spoken. The Official Census of 1991 reported 15,500 Slovene speakers in the state of Carinthia, with some estimates going up to 31,000 or 5.7% of the state's population at the time. The Slovenian Gymnasium in Klagenfurt is the central educational institution for the Slovene speaking community of Austria. In 1992 there were 3,000 pupils enrolled in bilingual classes.

The Slovene population through the process of germanisation and silient assimilation dropped significantly, going from 137,000 in the year 1818 to just 13,109 in the year 2001. Though a significant part of Carinthians still have germanised Slovene surnames.

During the time of the Socialist Federal Republic of Yugoslavia its authorities and authorities of constituent Socialist Republic of Slovenia and Socialist Republic of Croatia were involved in a series of disputes over the treatment of ethnic minorities in Austria. Slovenian dissatisfaction was caused by differences in interpretation of the Austrian State Treaty as well as the decision by Carinthian authorities to end compulsory bilingual schooling in 1958. In April 1971 the Slovene "Contact Committee" expressed their dissatisfaction in a memorandum to the Austrian Chancellor Bruno Kreisky in which they listed requests for specific measures for the protection of the Slovene language. On 11 November 1976 approximately 150,000 people in Ljubljana participated in an officially sponsored protest in solidarity with the Slovene community.

== See also ==
- Languages of Austria
- Demographics of Austria
- Burgenland Croats
- Carinthian Slovenes
- Czechs in Austria
- Slovaks in Austria
- Romani in Austria
- Vlax Romani language
