= Czech print media in Vienna =

Czech print media in Vienna have a long history dating back to the 18th and 19th century, when Vienna had a sizeable Czech population.

== Habsburg Monarchy ==
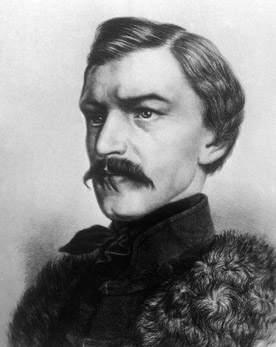
Portrait of Karel Havlíček Borovský

The first Czech language newspapers were short-lived and there were long periods without any publications. The C.k. privilegované české vídeňské poštovní noviny (Imperially privileged Viennese post paper) was published for the first time in 1761 but quickly folded. The next Czech language newspaper (Cís. král. Vídeňskè Novíny, Imperial Viennese newspaper) was printed between 1813 and 1817. It was edited by Johann Nepomuk Hromátko.

Vídeňský posel (Viennese Messenger), the official publication of the böhmisch-mährisch-schlesischer Verein (Bohemian-Moravian-Silesian Association) appeared for the first time in 1848. It was described as a newspaper of high quality and modern spirit; when it too folded, there was no Czech language newspaper in Vienna for two years. It is not known when Karel Havlíček Borovský’s Slovan (The Slav) was printed for the first time, but from July 1850, the government-controlled pan-Slavic Vídeňský deník (Viennese Daily) was printed as a competitor to Slovan. After Slovan closed down, Vídeňský deník also ceased production.

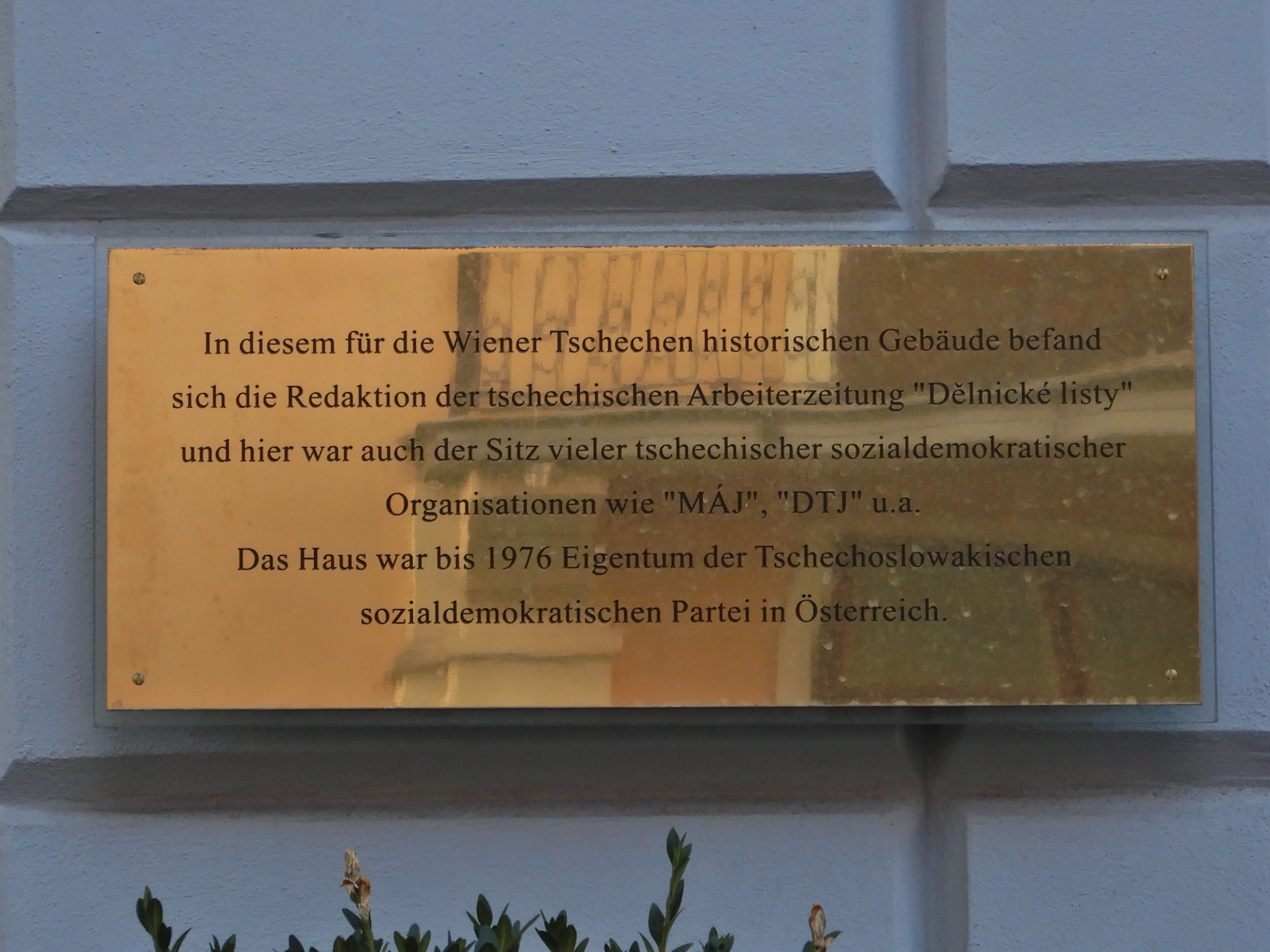
Memorial plaque at the former Dělnické listy newsroom

Two Czech language newspapers were published throughout World War I: Vídeňský deník and Dělnické listy (Workers’ Pages).

The confiscation of Czech language newspapers in Vienna was not an unusual event. Readers were sometimes even arrested in cafés.

== First Republic ==
Dělnické listy changed its name to Vídeňské dělnické listy (Viennese Workers’ Pages) in 1926. It was printed for the last time on 12 February 1934, when it, along with all other social-democrat newspapers, was closed down (see Austrian Civil War). Vídeňské dělnické listy was replaced with the Vídeňské noviny Viennese Newspaper, which appeared three times per week – under the name of Vídeňské nedělní noviny (Viennese Sunday Newspaper) on Sundays. The National-Socialists shut this paper in 1942.

Alongside political groups – such as the Wiener tschechische Bürgerliche (Viennese Czech Gentry) and the communists – the majority of Czech language periodicals were published by different associations. The Komenský association’s Rakouský obzor (Austrian Review) was an independent publication until 1922; thereafter, it appeared as a supplement in Dunaj (Danube). České srdce (Czech Heart), the official publication of the Czechoslovak social charity with the same name was also distributed as a supplement. Both papers folded in 1928.

From 1922, there was a monthly paper for school-age children - Útěcha (Solace), which appeared once per month to begin with, then only ten times per year from 1927 onwards. Production of this paper ceased when the Komenský association was dissolved in 1941.

The Austrian Civil War hit those papers in particular that were close to the social democrats, while the Anschluss had consequences for all Czech and Slovak publications.

Vienna’s Czechs were allowed to broadcast on the Austrian national radio just once during the First Republic. On 9 August 1933, František Melichar was granted leave to address his countrymen and countrywomen during the programme Fremdenpropaganda (Foreign Propaganda). Further requests for broadcast time were refused.

== 1938 - 1945 ==
In 1941, Antonín Machát’s press was prohibited from continuing to printVídeňské noviny and the Vídeňské nedělní noviny. The press itself was however allowed to continue working. It continued to exist until 1972. The Nazis banned all Czech language newspapers and periodicals in 1942.

== Second Republic ==
A new Czech language newspaper, Vídeňské svobodné listy (Viennese Free Pages), was founded by the Czech organisations in Vienna in 1946. Following the communist seizure of power in Czechoslovakia in 1948, the newspaper Menšinové listy (Minority Pages) was published in Austria; this publication later changed its title to Krajanské noviny (Countrymen's Newspaper) and was supported by the Czechoslovak state. 10 years after the Velvet Revolution, this newspaper ceased production.

=== Newspapers being published today ===
- Vídeňské svobodné listy: Since 1985, this newspaper has been produced once per fortnight. It contains association news, a calendar of events as well as news from the Czech Republic and Slovakia.
- KLUB. Kulturní mĕsíčník Čechů a Slováků v Rakousku (Czech and Slovak monthly culture magazine in Austria): The monthly KLUB has been in existence since 1981. It is published by the Kulturní klub Čechů a Slováků v Rakousku (Czech and Slovak cultural club in Austria) and appears 11 times per year.
- The Komenský association publishes both Česká a slovenská Vídeň dnes (Czech and Slovak Vienna Today) with information about the association’s schools and a calendar.

Since the Velvet Revolution in 1989 and in particular since the Czech Republic joined the EU, improved transport connections and an open border between the Czech Republic and Austria have made it increasingly easy to buy newspapers printed in the Czech Republic in Vienna.

== Publishers and printers ==
The Druckerei Melantrich was founded in the Pramergasse in 1897. In 1922, it became a joint stock company. Around the same time, this publisher opened its own bookstore. Between World War I and World War II, the Druckerei Melantrich published works of both fiction and non-fiction; it also printed the newspapers of the Czech bourgeois political factions. The Druckerei Melantrich changed its name to “Hermes”, Druck- und Verlagsanstalt Aktiengesellschaft in October 1939, and over time it broadened the scope of its business to include the printing of maps, musical recordings and advertising. The firm existed until 1989.

In 1908, politician and author Antonín Machát founded a printing press at Margaretenplatz (number 7) with the title Lidová knihtiskárna (People's Book Printing Press). The associated publishing house Vídeňská knihovna was founded in the same year and published in particular the works of social democrats. 16 different newspapers and periodicals were being published here in 1925.

The Danubius printer and publishing house was also controlled by social democrats. There were numerous smaller publishers that printed newspapers. Books published in Vienna were also sold in Czechoslovakia.

== Libraries ==
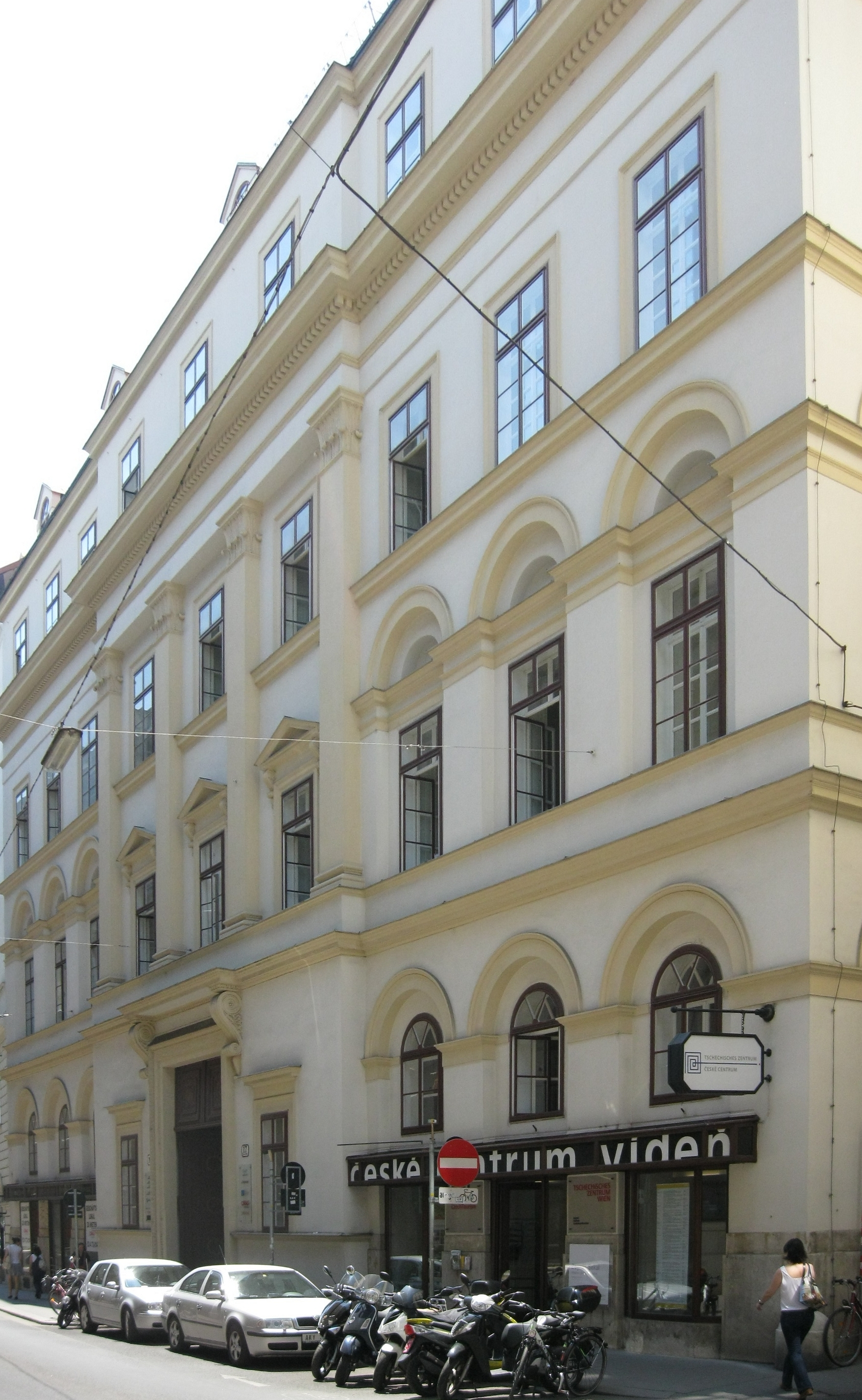
Seat of the Czech Center with its library

The following Czech libraries existed in Vienna: (ref?)

- Komenský and 'Svatopluk Cech' jointly owned a library in Landstraße
- Sokol and the Akademický spolek (Academic's association) ran a library in Innere Stadt
- The Czech social democrats had a library in Rudolfsheim-Fünfhaus
- The associations Svatopluk Cech and Nova doba had libraries in Brigittenau

The holdings of the district branches of the associations Maj, Barak and Komenský were also open to the public. Several sporting and tourist associations also owned relevant books and maps.

The associations bought large quantities of books in Czechoslovakia in order to top up the holdings of these libraries and to keep them up-to-date; in 1930–31 for example, books to the value of more than 300,000 koruna were bought for this purpose. After the Komenský association was dissolved on 16 May 1942, its library was formally taken over by the Austrian National Library. The approximately 70,000 books in its holdings survived the war in storage at the National Library and were returned in 1950 after a claim was filed in 1948.

Currently, the Czech Centre in Vienna runs a Czech library.

== See also ==
- Czechs in Vienna
