= Austria–Czech Republic relations =

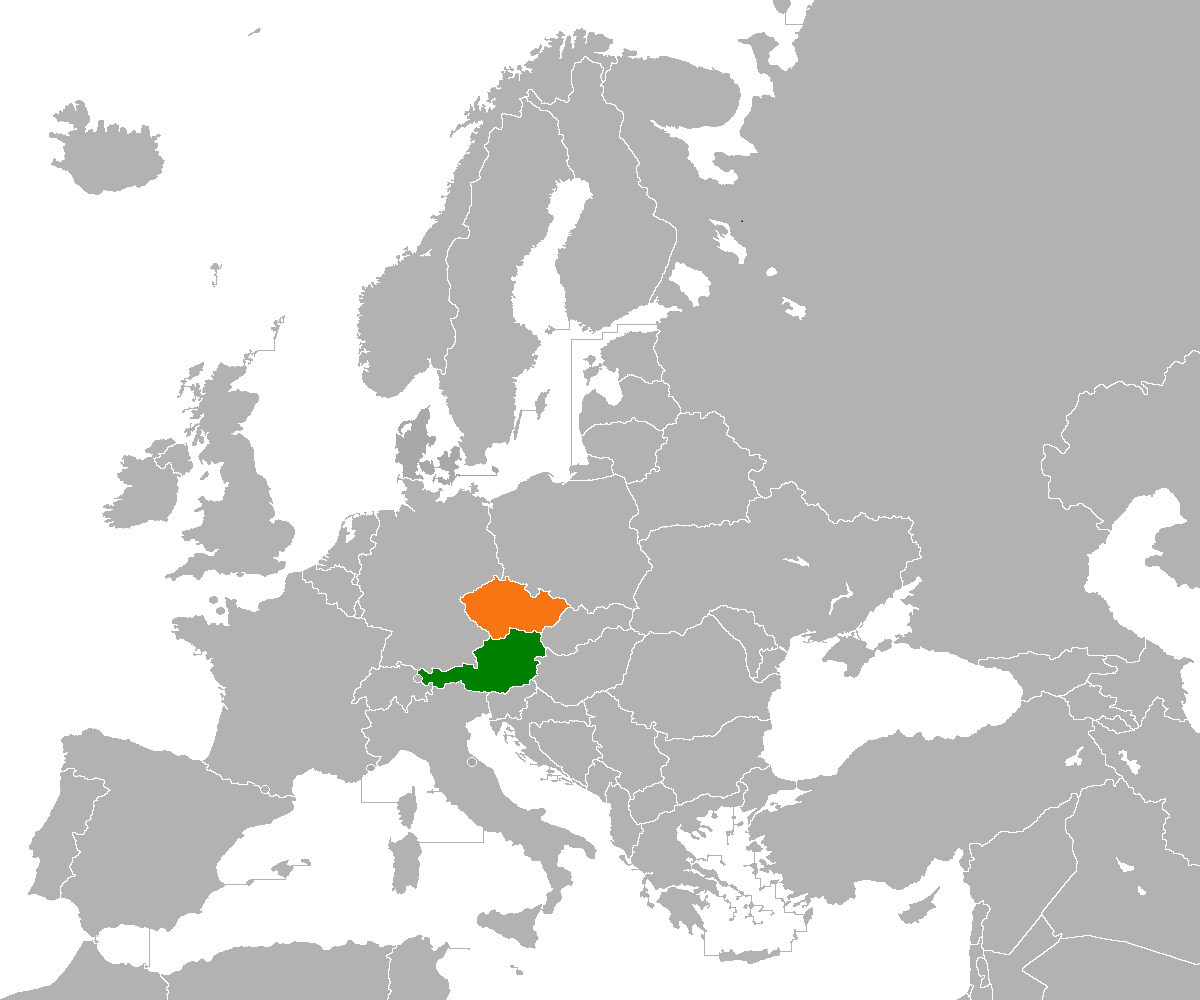
- Austria: Czech Republic

Neighborly relations exist between Austria and the Czech Republic, two member states of the European Union. Austria gave full support to the Czech Republic's membership of the European Union. The Czech Republic is a member state of NATO, while Austria is not.

== Country comparison ==
Official name	Czech Republic	Republic of Austria
Common name	Czechia	Austria
Flag	Czech Republic	Austria
Coat of arms		
Anthem	Kde domov můj (Czech)	Bundeshymne der Republik Österreich (German)
Population	10,649,800	9,027,999
Area	78,866 km^{2} (30,450 sq mi)	83,871 km^{2} (32,383 sq mi)
Population density	134/km^{2} (347.1/sq mi)	107.6/km^{2} (278.7/sq mi)
Time zones	UTC+1 (CET): DST UTC+2 (CEST)	
Government	Unitary parliamentary constitutional republic	Federal parliamentary republic
Capital & largest city	Prague – 1,324,277 (2,677,964 Metro)	Vienna - 1,794,380 (2,890,577 Metro)
Official language	Czech	German
First leader	Bořivoj I, Duke of Bohemia (867–889, traditionally) Václav Havel (1936-2011, current constitution)	Francis II (1768-1835, traditionally) Karl Renner (1870–1950, current constitution)
Current head of government	Prime Minister Andrej Babiš (ANO; 2025–present)	Chancellor Christian Stocker (2025-present)
Current head of state	President Petr Pavel (2023–present)	President Alexander Van der Bellen (2017–present)
GDP (nominal)	$360.230 billion $33,040 per capita	$559.220 billion $61,800 per capita
GDP (PPP)	$432.346 billion $59,210 per capita	$700.203 billion $74,981 per capita
Currency	Czech koruna (Kč) – CZK	Euro (€) – EUR
HDI	0.915 (very high) - 2023	0.926 (very high) - 2022
Expatriates	5,000 Austrians in the Czech Republic	40,324 Czechs in Austria

== Early relations ==
=== Middle ages ===
Both countries have a long common history. For the first time united from 1253 until 1276 under the reign of Ottokar II of Bohemia, they later joined again and, together with Hungary, formed a major European power under the Habsburg dynasty which lasted from 1526 until 1918. Initially only a personal union, the ever more centralized monarchy ruled mostly from Vienna (Prague was the capital only from 1583 until 1611) was increasingly seen as an obstacle of the Czech and German national interests during the uprising of nationalism in Central Europe from the second half of the 19th century. The Czechs demanded to be ruled by a government in Prague, the capital city of their kingdom, not in Vienna, and as part of their main party strategy of passive resistance did not participate for years in the political discussions and decisions of the Austrian Reichsrat, the parliament in Vienna representing all nations of the Austrian part of the Austro-Hungarían Monarchy. Ethnic Germans at the same time wanted to participate in the ongoing German unification process.

=== Early modern period ===
While the emperor had given internal autonomy to the Hungarians in 1867 to reduce tensions with the Magyar aristocracy, the Czechs' wishes never were fulfilled until the end of the empire in 1918. This was due to the fact that in Bohemia 37% and in Moravia 28% of the population were Germans, who fiercely opposed to represent a minority in a Czech parliament, while they were part of the leading nation in Cisleithania.

Although the Czech lands developed as the industrial centre of the Monarchy, hundreds of thousand Bohemians of poor personal living standard, mainly from agricultural areas of southern Moravia, moved to Vienna between 1870 and 1910 to work there in cheap jobs. Badly educated and not capable of much German language as some of them were, they were considered low class people by the Viennese, and Böhm or Bem (which, in Viennese dialect, means a person from Bohemia) was used pejorative long into the 20th century in Austria. Aside from these the imperial capital attracted a large number of middle-class Bohemians who studied or pursued careers there, including Sigmund Freud, Karel Rokytanský, Gustav Mahler, the future president of Czechoslovakia, Tomáš Garrigue Masaryk and many others. Until today, one may trace Czech migrants in the Vienna Telephone Directory (from Adamec to Zwierzina).

=== Early republics and world wars ===
South Moravia was the birthplace of two federal presidents of Austria: Karl Renner, who decisively took part in the creation of the First Austrian Republik in 1918 as State Chancellor and was president from 1945 to 1950, in 1870 was born at Untertannowitz / Dolni Dunajovice in the so-called Dyje arc (Thayabogen). Adolf Schärf, vice chancellor from 1945 to 1957 and president from 1957 to 1965, in 1873 was born in the city of Nikolsburg / Mikulov near the Austrian border. Many aristocratic and bourgeois families of great influence in Austrian politics, economy and the arts had their roots in what is now the Czech Republic.

During the First World War, while nearly 1.5 million Czechs fought in the Austro-Hungarian army, exiled Czech politicians backed by the military legions worked on the regaining of the independence of Bohemia in the form of Czech-Slovak union. The Entente powers supported their plans, which did not provide any autonomy or other special treatment for the Germans in the new country.

After the end of the empire in October and November, 1918, German Austria and Czechoslovakia shortly quarreled on the issue of the German districts in Bohemia and Moravia, where more than 3 million German inhabitants wanted to join the State of German Austria (and within this state, the German republic). The Czechs immediately occupied these districts to keep the "integrity of the Bohemian lands", and the Treaty of St. Germain of 1919 acknowledged their rights to keep them.

Both countries established diplomatic relations on January 20, 1920. When Austria entered dictatorial rule in 1934, Austrian Social Democrats like Otto Bauer and Julius Deutsch found refuge in the Czechoslovak Republic and founded the ALÖS (Auslandsbüro der österreichischen Sozialdemokraten), the foreign bureau of Austrian Social Democrats, in Brno. There until 1938 they published the Arbeiter-Zeitung (literally the workers' newspaper), which had been the daily organ of the Social Democratic Party of Austria and been prohibited by the Austrofascists, to be "illegally" exported to Austria. In March 1938, when Austria was annexed to Germany, again some politicians flew to the neighboring country, at this time together with Switzerland the only democracy in Central Europe.

=== Cold War era ===
Many Germans in the Czech lands joyfully had welcomed Hitler's annexation of the German districts, called Sudetenland, in September 1938, and had taken part in the occupation of the remaining Czech area in March 1939. This led the Czechs to expel nearly all Germans in 1945 and 1947. The properties these people had to leave behind when moving to their new countries of residence have been in fact nationalized and then redistributed among the Czech population under set rules. Although war damages exceeded value of these properties, Czechoslovakia did not claim any reparations from Germany and Austria and considered transfer of these properties ownership the fastest and most efficient way how to recover the nation after the world war. Many of people expelled moved to the Western zones of occupied Germany, some of them settled in Austria. Some people, however, were either allowed to stay or return to the country when proving their innocence.

In 1948, the Iron Curtain went down between Czechoslovakia and Austria. Many railway tracks and roads connecting the two countries were closed down for a long time. (Railway traffic from Laa an der Thaya to Hevlin and from Fratres to Slavonice has not been reopened until 2009.) In 1968, at the end of the Prague Spring, many Czechs fled to Austria. In 1978, the Czech author Pavel Kohout started to work for the Burgtheater in Vienna; his and his wife's Czechoslovak citizenship subsequently was revoked in 1979 and both were granted Austrian citizenship.

== Modern relations ==
In late 1989, the Czechs for the first time after 40 years could enter Austria as free citizens. In the nineties, Austrian ecologists demonstrated against the nuclear power plant at Temelin, 50 kilometres north of the Austrian border to the Czech Republic. In 2000, in the so-called Protocol of Melk, the two governments agreed on certain nuclear safety standards and cross-border information without delay.

In 2008, Karel Schwarzenberg (Czech minister of foreign affairs) and Jiri Grusa, who has acted as Czech ambassador and as director of the Diplomatic Academy in Vienna, shared the opinion that Austrians and Czechs are of different language, but of "the same nation", the same character. Schwarzenberg himself had lived in Vienna for decades before returning to the Czech lands after 1989.

== European Union ==
Austria joined the EU in 1995. Czech Republic joined the EU in 2004.

== NATO ==
While Czech Republic became a member of NATO in 1999, Austria has never been a member of NATO.

== Resident diplomatic missions ==
- Austria has an embassy in Prague.
- Czech Republic has an embassy in Vienna.
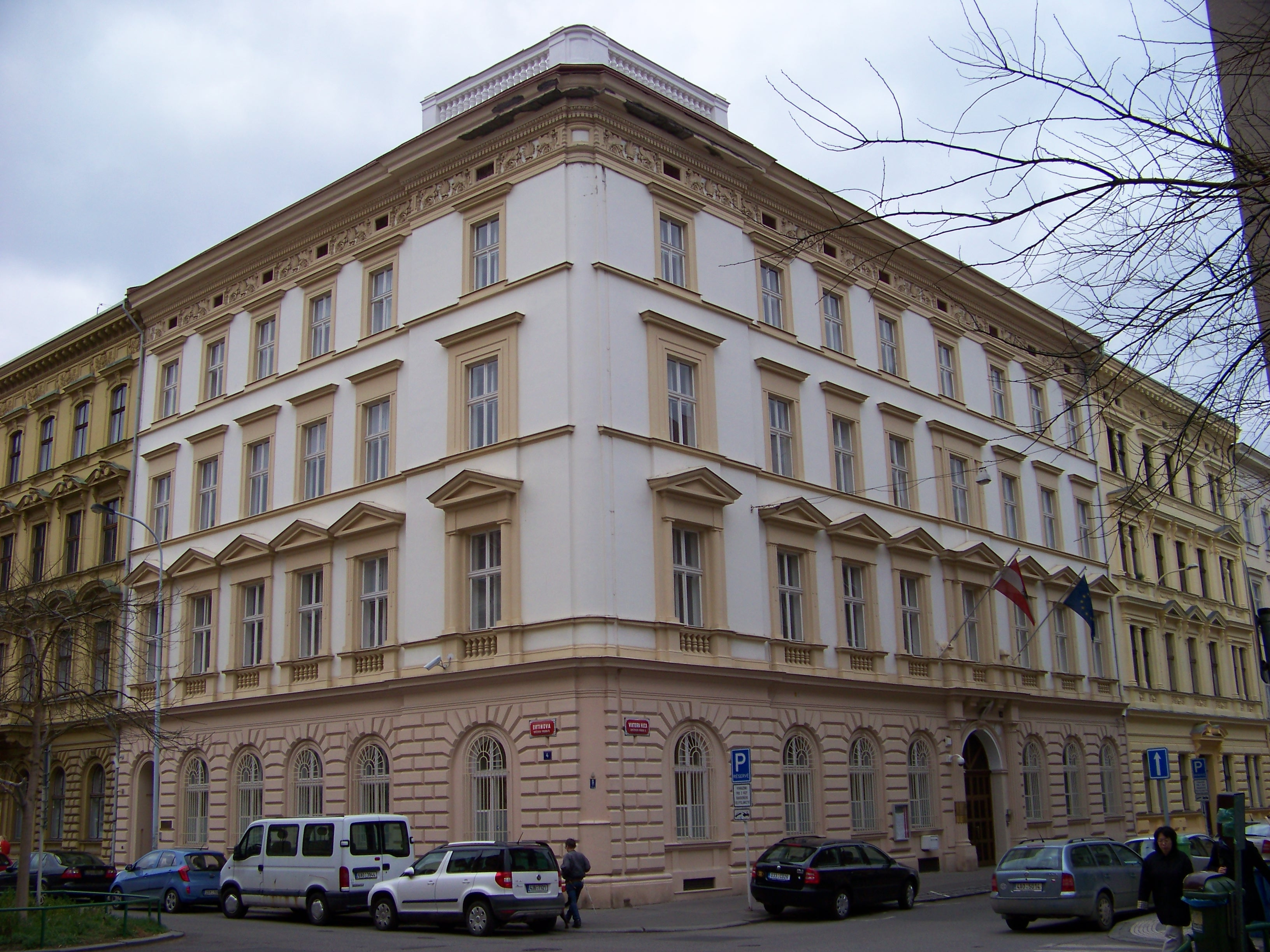
Embassy of Austria in Prague

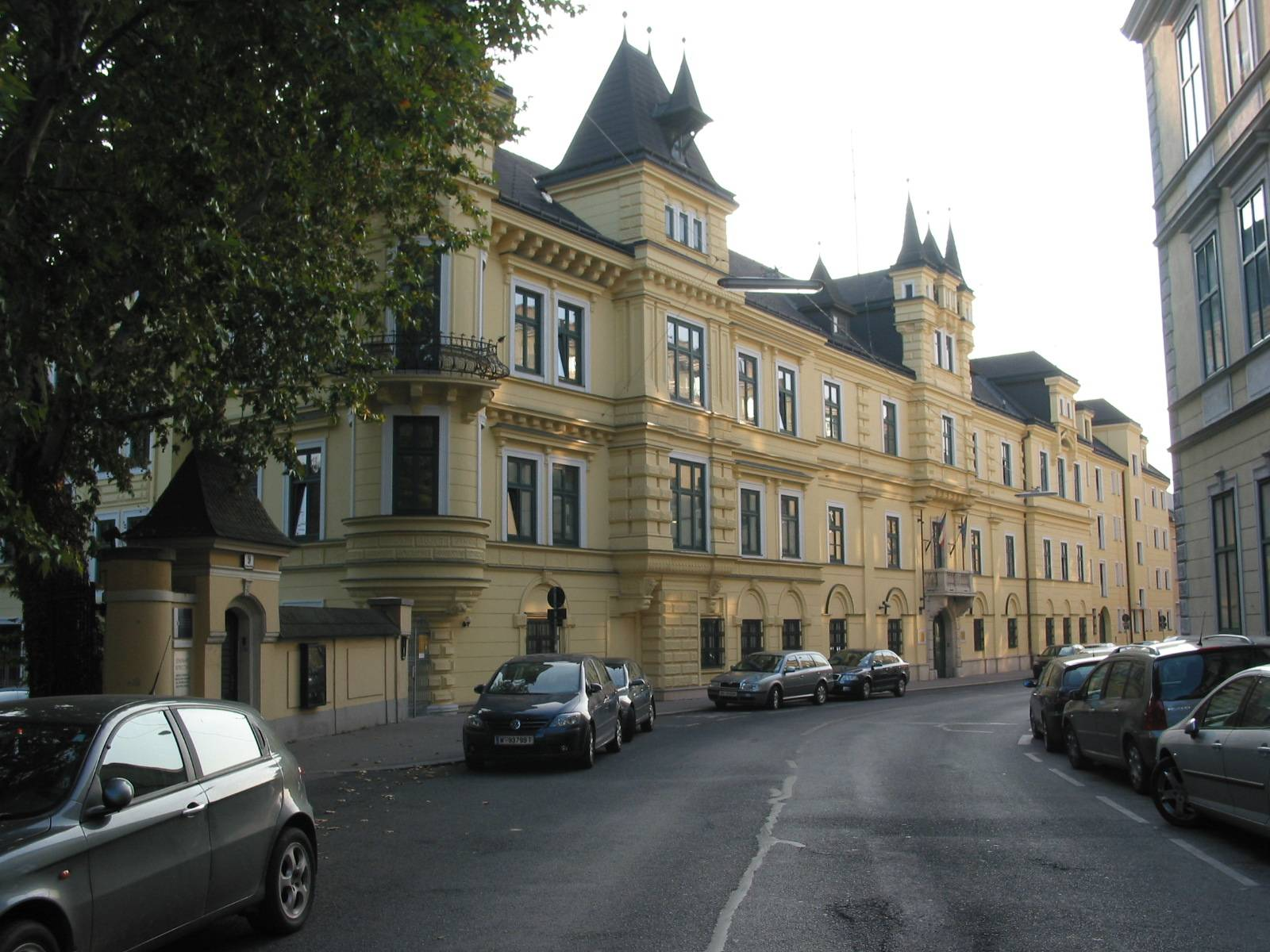
Embassy of the Czech Republic in Vienna

== See also ==
- Foreign relations of Austria
- Foreign relations of the Czech Republic
- Czechs in Austria
  - History of the Czechs in Vienna
- 1995 enlargement of the European Union
- 2004 enlargement of the European Union
