= Austria–Slovakia relations =

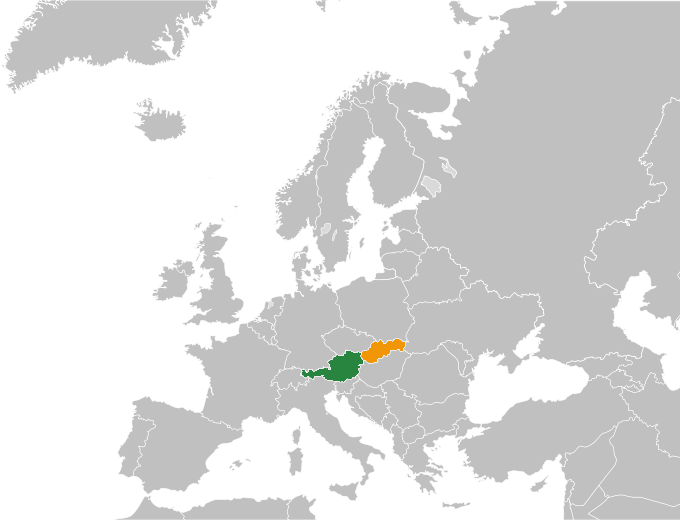
- Austria: Slovakia

Austria–Slovakia relations are foreign relations between Austria and Slovakia. Austria has an embassy in Bratislava. Slovakia has an embassy in Vienna. Both countries are full members of the Council of Europe, European Union and Organization for Security and Co-operation in Europe. Slovakia is a member of NATO, while Austria is a not member.

== European Union ==
Austria joined the EU in 1995. Slovakia joined the EU in 2004.

== Resident diplomatic missions ==
- Austria has an embassy in Bratislava.
- Slovakia has an embassy in Vienna.
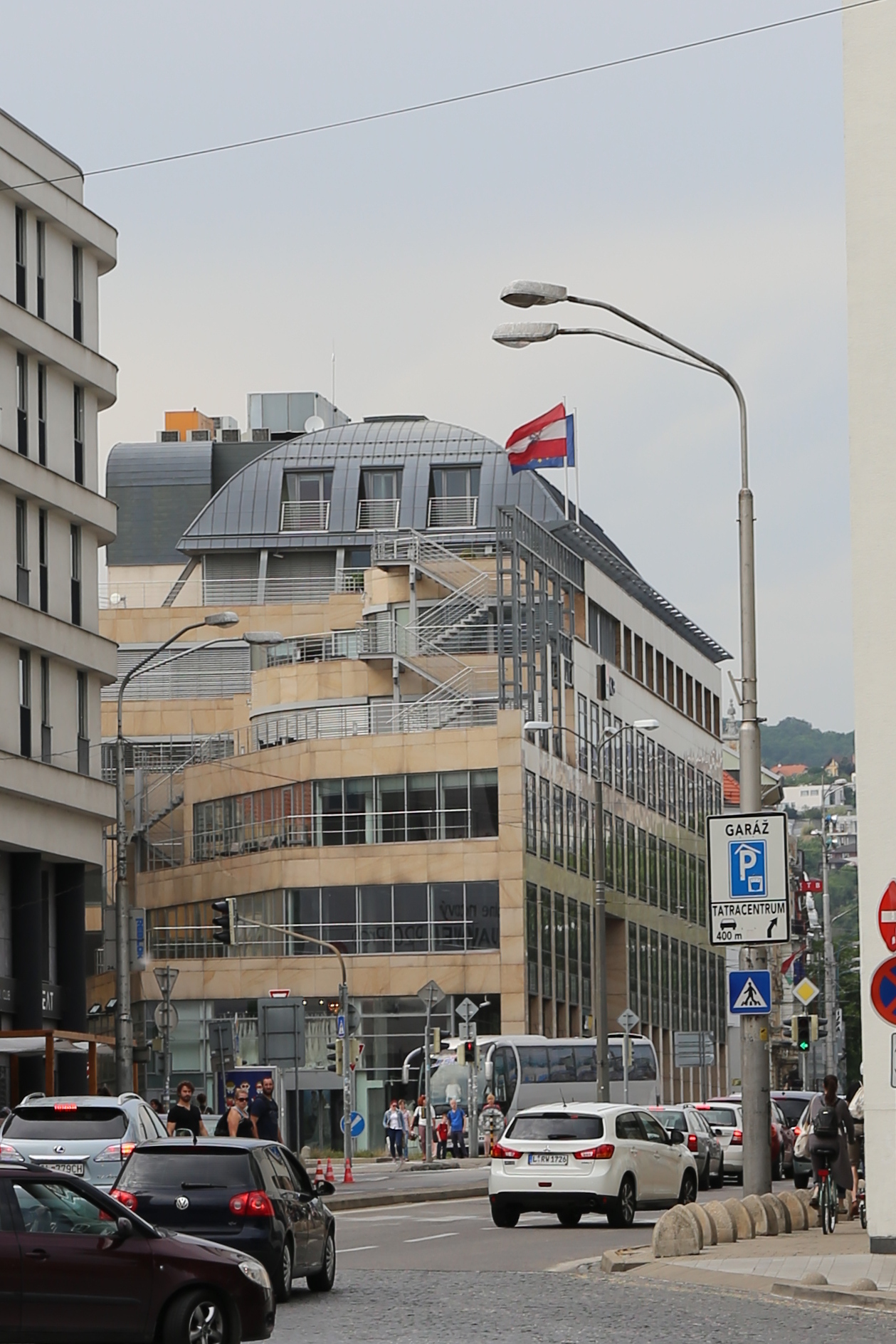
Embassy of Austria in Bratislava

== See also ==
- Foreign relations of Austria
- Foreign relations of Slovakia
- Austrians in Slovakia
- Slovaks in Austria

== Sources ==
- Gruber, Simon (2013). "Slovakia as seen from an Austrian perspective: on the way toward a level playing field". International Issues & Slovak Foreign Policy Affairs. 22 (1–2). Research Center of the Slovak Foreign Policy Association: 9–20. ISSN 1336-0361. JSTOR 26590377.
