= Federal Gymnasium for Slovenes =

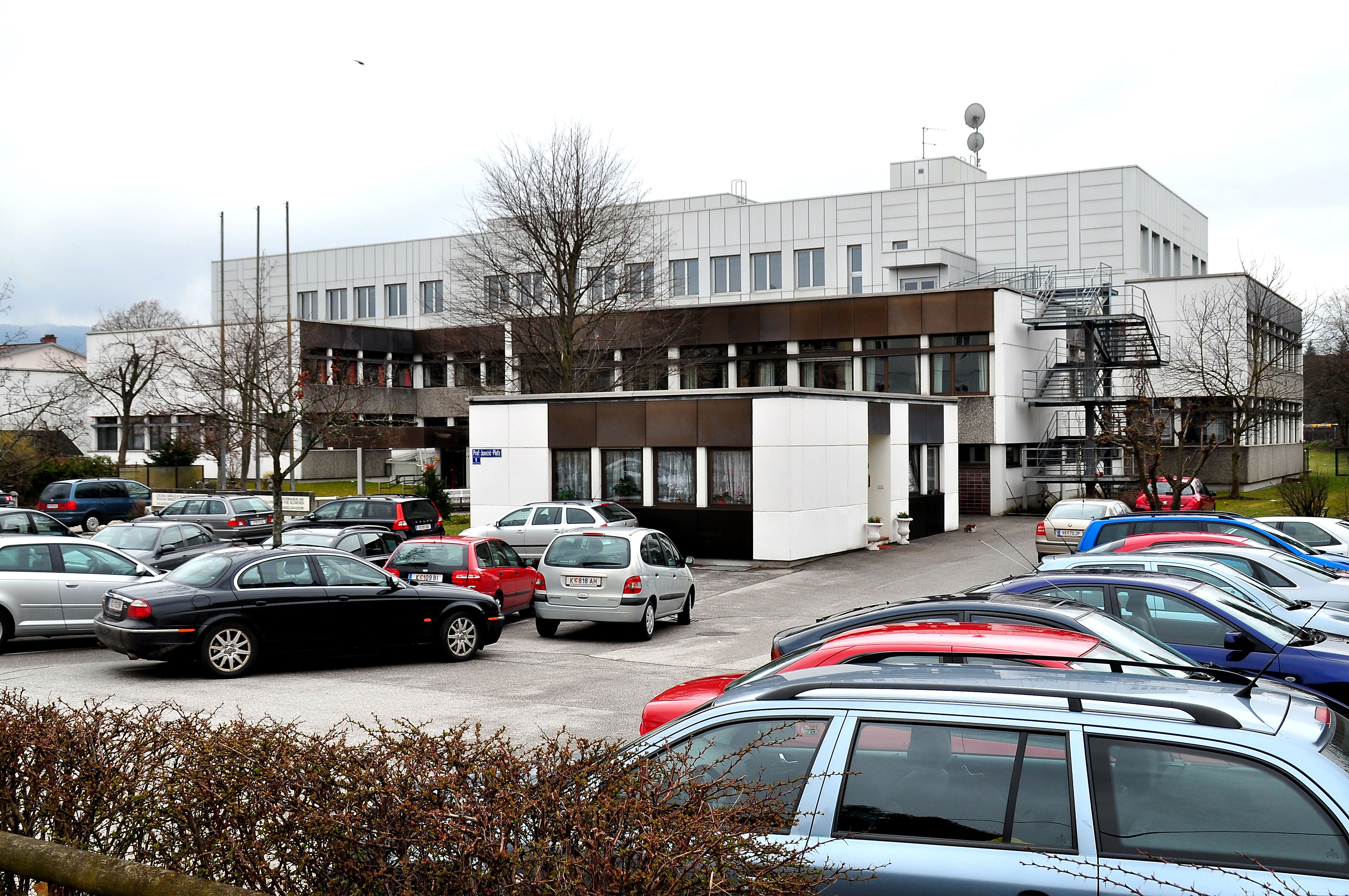
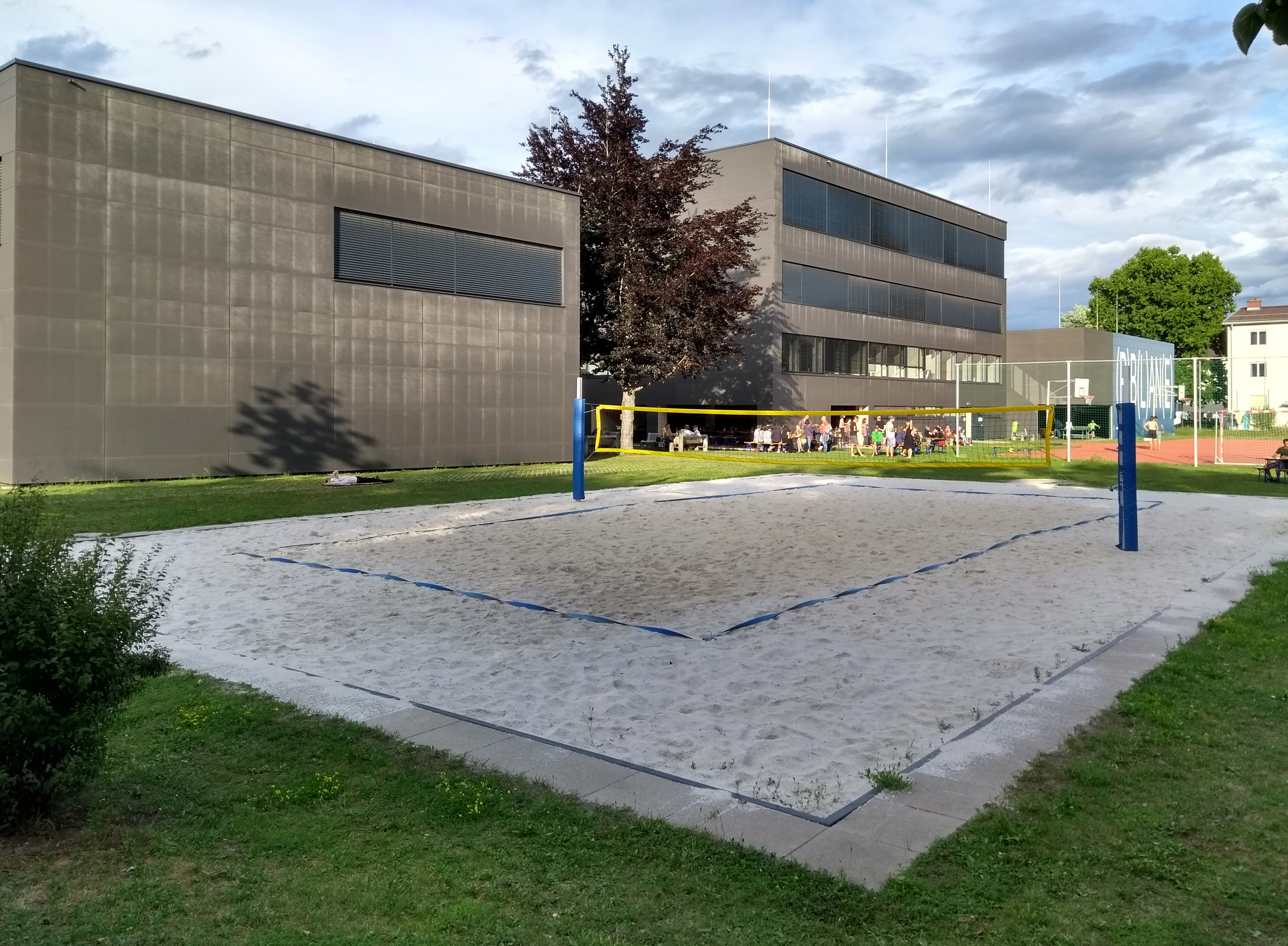
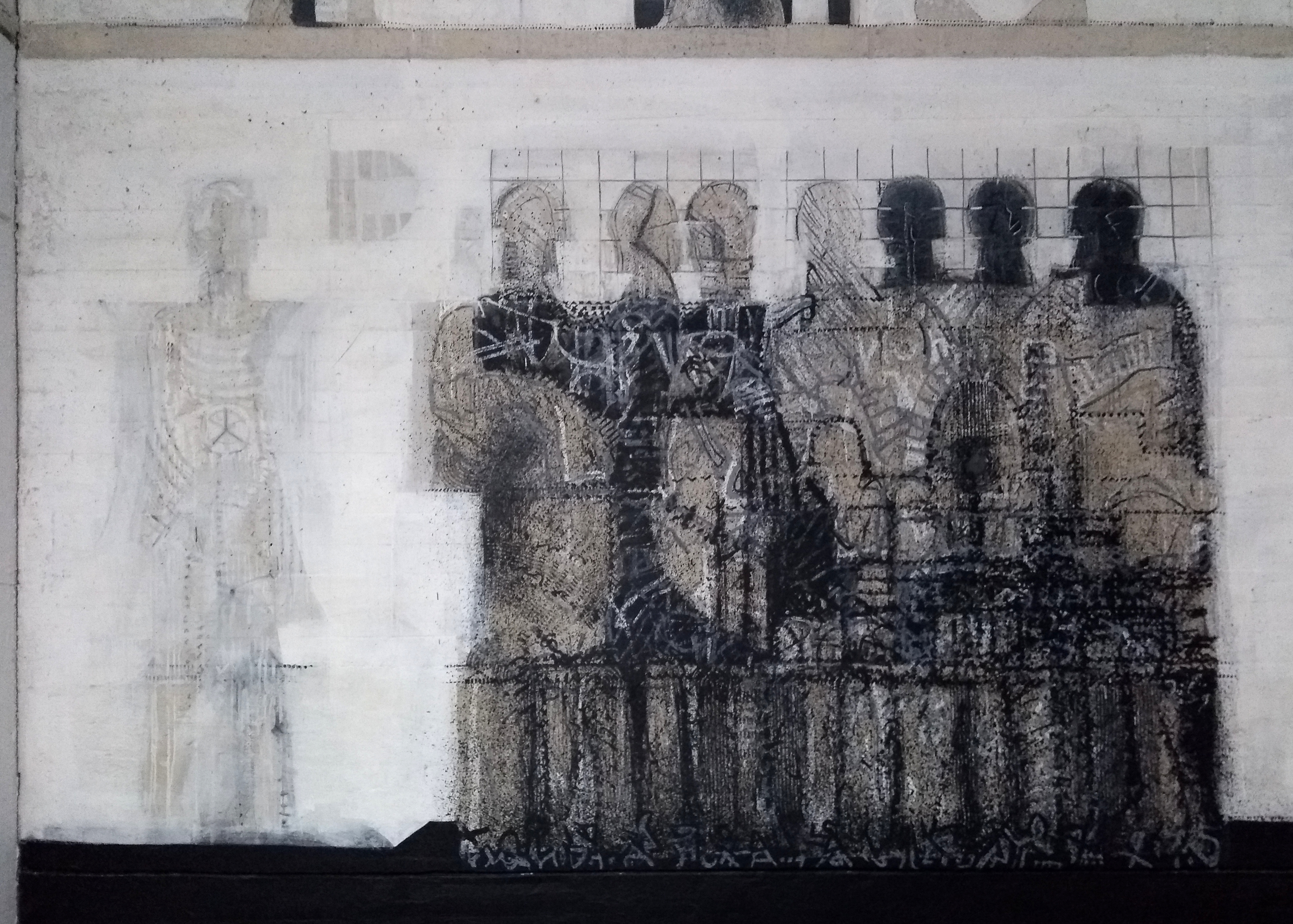

Location
- Klagenfurt, Carinthia; Austria
- Coordinates: 46°37′26″N 14°19′24″E

Information
- Type: public school
- Established: 1957; 69 years ago
- Enrollment: 543 (2021-2022)
- Campus: Urban
- Website: www.slog.at

The Federal Gymnasium for Slovenes (Slovene: Zvezna gimnazija za Slovence, German: Bundesgymnasium für Slowenen) is a public coeducational high school (gymnasium) in Klagenfurt, Austria, serving primarily the community of Carinthian Slovenes.

== Background ==
The school was founded in 1957 and initially operated as an afternoon school in the premises of the Lerchenfeldstraße Gymnasium. In 1975, the school moved to the current building located on Ebenthaler Straße, which is now under protection as a historical monument.

One of the central tasks of the school is to provide members of the Carinthian Slovene ethnic community with a native-language high school education. The school offers instruction in Slovenian, German, English, and Italian to both Slovene and non-Slovene students. A number of students are residents of neighbouring municipalities in Slovenia itself.

== See also ==
- Minority languages of Austria
