= Czechs in Austria =

Total population
- 40,324-60,000 (2016)

Regions with significant populations
- Vienna, Lower Austria

Languages
- Czech, German

Religion
- Irreligion (majority) · Roman Catholic (minority)

Related ethnic groups
- Slovaks in Austria, Czechs in Vienna

Czechs (German: Tschechen) are a historically significant and traditional migrant group within Austria. As of 2016, there were 40,324 self-identified Czechs in Austria. The only significant community of Austrian Czechs today is in Vienna, the capital city, where they have had a significant presence since the 19th century.

== History ==
In the 19th century, the Czech and Slovak region went through an economic depression, causing many unemployed ethnic Czechs and Slovak menial workers to migrate to Vienna and the Americas.

From the 1880s to the 1890s, around 230,000 Czechs and Slovaks emigrated to Austria proper, mainly for construction work and other menial labor jobs in the larger cities, particularly Vienna. After the fall of the Austro-Hungarian Empire, 150,000 people returned to Czechoslovakia after its independence. Of the more than 300,000 Czechs in the country, the population diminished to around 10,000 by 1991.

Since the admission of the Czech Republic to the European Union in 2004, several dozen thousand Czech citizens have emigrated to Austria, mainly due to the open borders that have been made possible by the Schengen Agreement. The Czech population has increased by as much as four times as of 2016.

== See also ==
- Austria–Czech Republic relations
- Immigration to Austria
- Czech diaspora
- Austrians in the Czech Republic
