= Czech schools in Vienna =

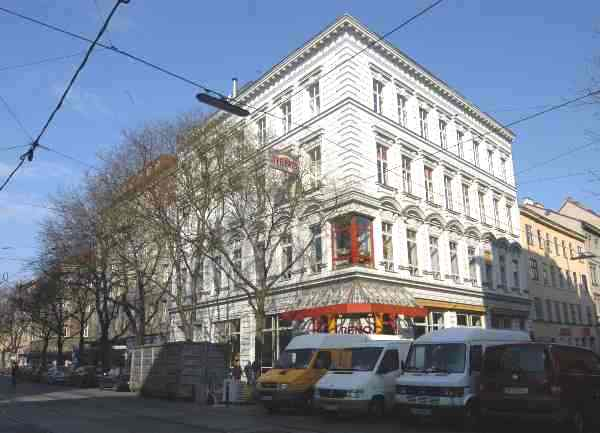
The former Komenský school in the Quellenstraße, number 72

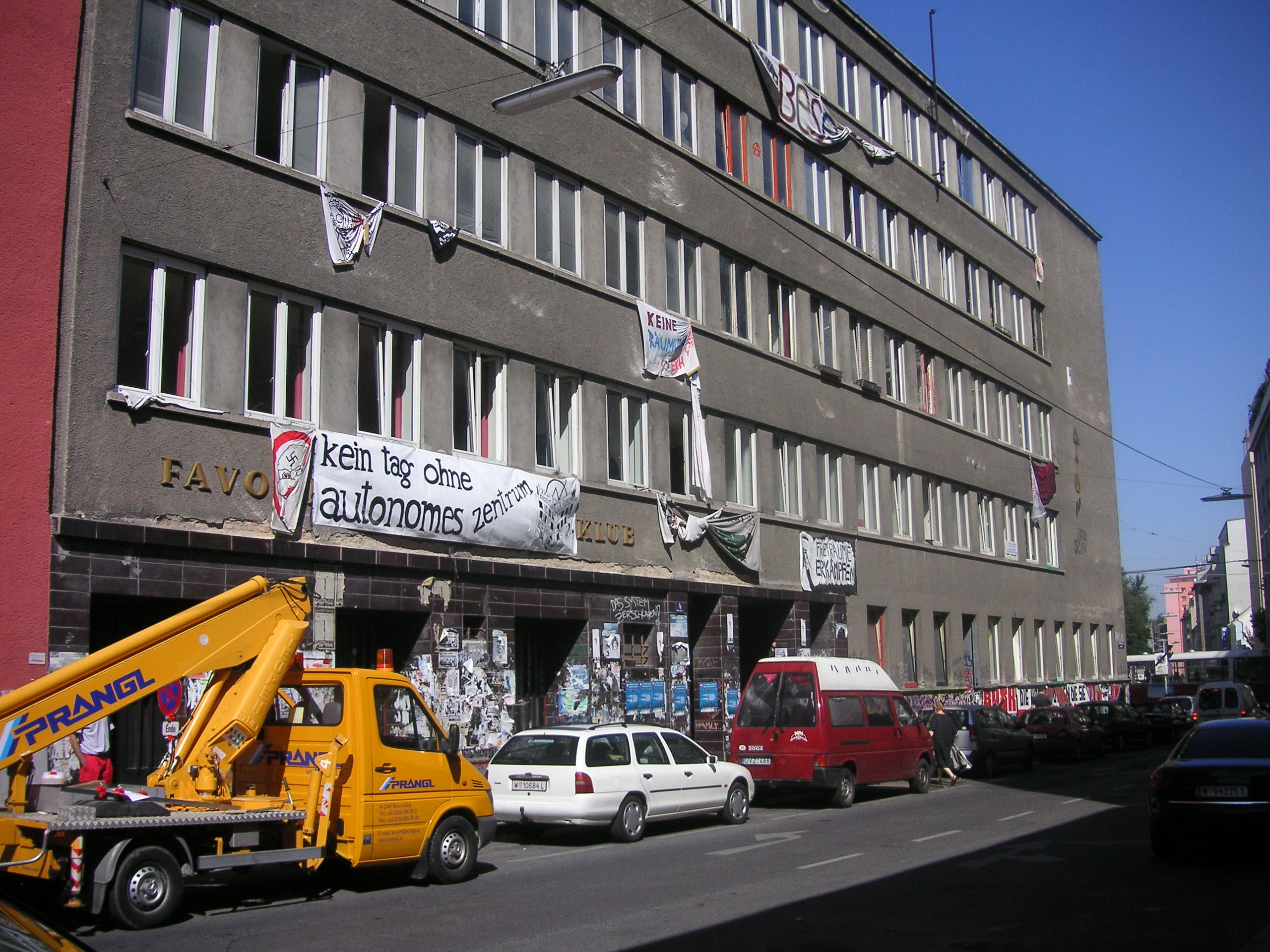
The former Komenský school in the Wielandgasse, now known as the Ernst-Kirchweger-Haus

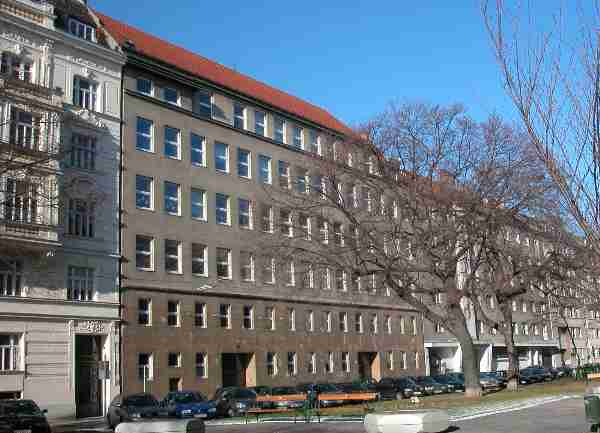
The Komenský school at the Sebastianplatz, number 3

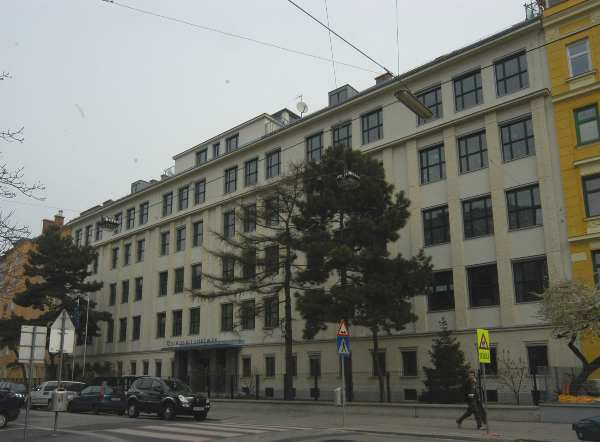
The former Komenský school in the Vorgartenstraße, number 95-97

During the 20th century, there were numerous Czech schools in Vienna. These provided the city's large Czech population with instruction in Czech.

== Habsburg Monarchy ==
The first Czech primary school with attached kindergarten was opened in the Quellenstraße in Favoriten in 1883. In 1908, a technical college was also founded; it was felt that the need for this was more pressing than for a grammar school.

The Komenský association, which was responsible for these schools, struggled to obtain public status for these institutions, which would have entitled them to state funding. Although the Dezemberverfassung laws of 21 December 1867 granted every "nationality" linguistic equality and thus the right to public schooling in its language, Vienna's mayor Karl Lueger feared that the city risked becoming increasing dominated by Slavs (it is estimated that as many as 500,000 Czechs lived in the city, which had a total population of 1.6 million). The Lower Austrian parliament, which was also responsible for Vienna at the time, ruled from 1896 onward that German should be the only language of instruction in all state schools. At first, the pupils in the Komenský association's private schools were even required to travel to Břeclav to take their final exams. It was not until 1908 that education minister Gustav Marchet resolved that Czech teachers could also hold these exams in Vienna. The city council criticised this as a serious attack on the German school system and Vienna's German character.

Lueger's successor, Josef Neumayer, from the Christian Social Party, ordered the closure of a newly established Komenský school in the Schützengasse on 23 September 1911. This act provoked not just a critical response in other parts of the empire, but also led to anti-Czech protests by German nationalists and members of the Christian Social Party. The largest rally attracted some 5000 people to a demonstration against Vienna's Czechs. During World War I, the Komenský association offered to let the City of Vienna use the school buildings as a lazaret. The buildings had been kept closed by the authorities, allegedly because of their poor construction, but the City accepted the association's offer.

== First Republic ==
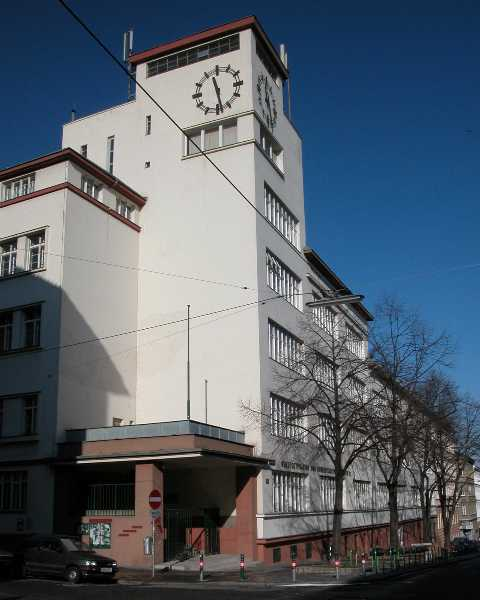
The former Komenský school in the Erlgasse (in Meidling)

The Treaty of Saint-Germain included provisions requiring the protection of minority rights in education. The Brünner Vertrag between Austria and Czechoslovakia, which also concerned the school system, was signed on 7 June 1920.

The realisation of the obligation to provide public schools for Vienna's Czech children was problematic. Czechs complained that the city's bilingual schools (which offered separate German and Czech instruction at different times during the day) required their children to attend in the afternoon, and that there were twice as many children in each classroom in the afternoon as during the German instruction in the morning. The government ban on teaching German at public Czech schools led many children to attend the Komenský schools.

In response to the lack of space made available in public schools, the Komenský association built the Krofta-Schule, which included a kindergarten, high school and technical college in the Herbststraße in Ottakring in 1923/24. This was made possible thanks to financial support from the association's backers in Prague.

In 1933, the Komenský association had 35 schools and kindergartens in Vienna:

- 17 Kindergartens
- 6 Primary schools
- 6 High schools
- 1 Technical grammar school
- 1 Technical college
- 1 Business school
- 1 School for women's professions
- 2 Slovak language schools

The Komenský association and its educational institutions were not directly touched by the Austrian Civil War, because they were not aligned to the Social Democrats. All school staff were however required to join the Vaterländische Front (Patriotic Front). In 1935, the technical grammar school relocated to a new site at the Sebastianplatz, while a new kindergarten was opened in Inzersdorf.

== 1938–1945 ==
By 1938, the Komenský association was not only one of Vienna's Czechs’ most important organisations; it was also one of the wealthiest. The association owned, in addition to its financial wealth, numerous school buildings and properties, the largest Czech library in Vienna (which had 70,000–100,000 books), two school busses as well as educational materials.

Following the Anschluss, the new authorities decreed that all non-Aryan state employees should be made redundant. This also affected the Komenský association's teachers. Following the Munich Agreement, the situation became more dire; the association's schools could only re-open fully in October 1938. As none of the Komenský association's representatives was an ethnic German and a member of the NSDAP, its employees were not approved by the authorities. In order to maintain public funding for its schools, the association was forced to accept the imposition of German school principals and ethnic German teachers for German lessons in 1939/40. From May 1941, all state funding was cancelled, and the schools lost their public status after the 1940/41 academic year.

The Komenský association's most important source of income during this time was the rent that it earned from its buildings. School authorities and the army were prompt payers, but NSDAP offices refused to pay rent to the association. On 18 February 1942, representatives of the association were called to the Gestapo headquarters at the Morzinplatz in central Vienna and were informed that their association was being dissolved. The association's buildings and properties in and around Vienna were confiscated.

== Second Republic ==
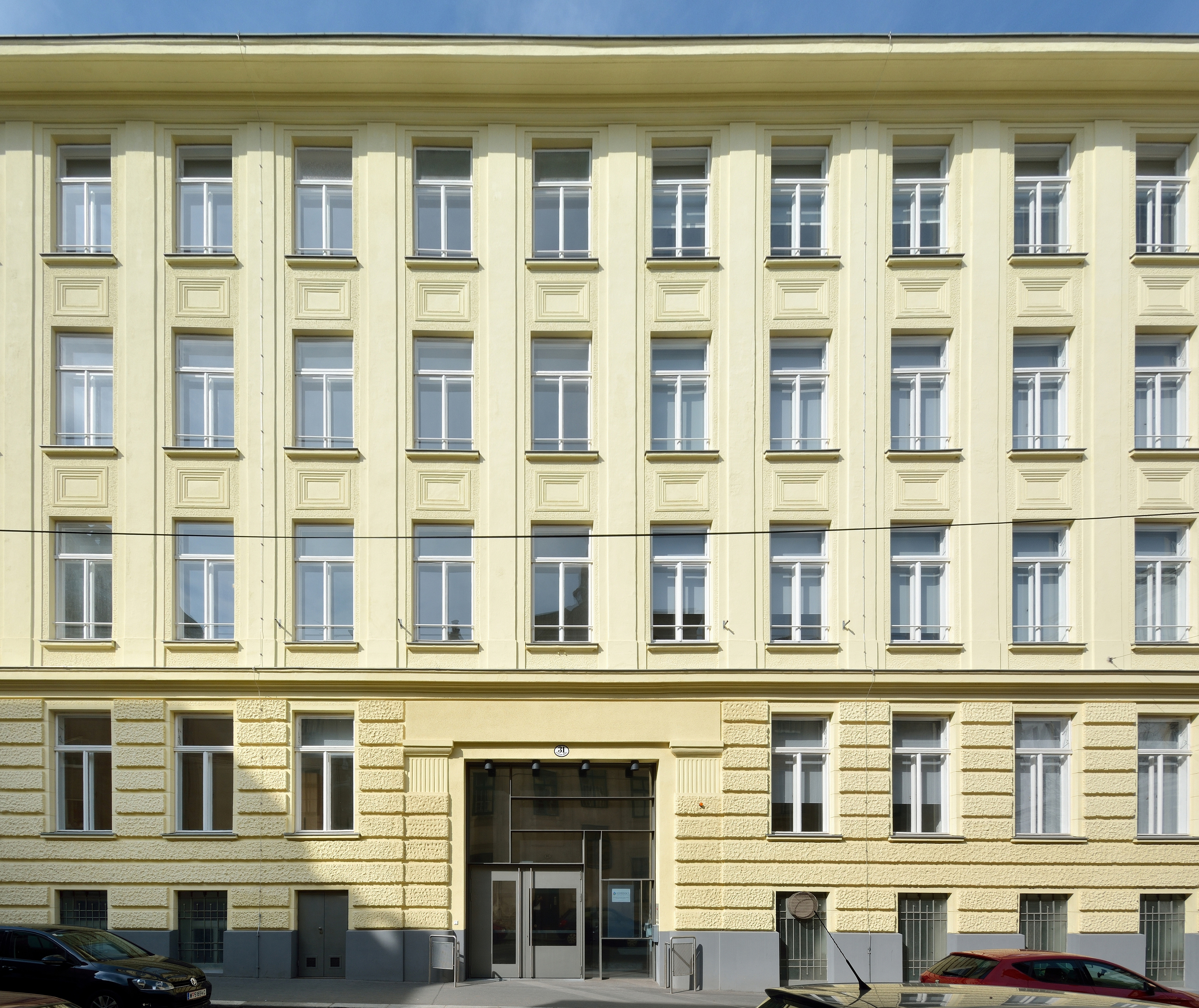
The Komenský school in the Schützengasse, number 31

The last two public Czech primary schools to be maintained by the city of Vienna were closed before the end of the war in 1945 and were not later reopened. The last Czech grammar school pupils completed their schooling shortly after the war.

The majority of the Komenský association's wealth – which the Nazis had invested – as well as its buildings and properties were returned by the Republic of Austria after the war.

As a result of large-scale Czech emigration from Vienna during and after the war, the Komenský association's activities were greatly reduced. It was operating only three schools in 1949: a high school at the Sebastianplatz, and primary schools in the Vorgartenstraße and the Herbststraße.

The Komenský association sold the majority of its buildings between 1960 and 1980. They were bought by private individuals, firms, the Republic of Austria, the city of Vienna dn other public organisations. Only the school at the Sebastianplatz continued to offer lessons. The school was financed at first by the Czechoslovak Socialist Republic; since 1980, the teachers have been paid by the Republic of Austria.

The Komenský association has once again been using a building in the Schützengasse for educational purposes; it houses a bilingual Oberstufenrealgymnasium, which began life in the 2000/01 academic year at the Sebastianplatz. The school offers the 9th to 12th forms and has a total of approximately 80 pupils. In 2004, pupils took their high school leaver's exams at a Komenský school for the first time since 1942.

== See also ==
- Czechs in Austria
- Czechs in Vienna (de)
