= Slovaks in Austria =

Total population
- 35,326 (2016)–40,000

Regions with significant populations
- Vienna, eastern Lower Austria, Styria

Languages
- Slovak, German

Religion
- Predominantly Roman Catholicism

Related ethnic groups
- Slovak diaspora

Slovaks in Austria (Austrian German: Österreichisch Slowaken; Slovak: Rakúski Slováci) have a history dating back to the early centuries of the Common Era. Currently, there are 35,326 Slovaks in Austria as of 2016. Large communities of Slovaks can be found in Vienna and Lower Austria, with a smaller community in Styria.

== History ==
=== Prior to the 20th century ===
Between the fifth and ninth centuries AD, Slovaks controlled the eastern part of what is now considered Lower Austria, where many ethnic Slovaks still remain.

From the 1880s the 1890s, around 230,000 Czechs and Slovaks emigrated to Austria proper, mainly for construction work and other menial labor jobs in the larger cities, particularly Vienna. At the turn of the century, an estimated 70,000 Slovak speakers in Austria, the vast majority being concentrated in Vienna and Marchfeld. Over the next 14 years, this number fell to 20,000.

=== Modern history ===
After the foundation of Czechoslovak Republic in 1918, many Slovaks emigrated back to the Slovakia region. In the 1923 census, only 5,000 Slovacophones declared their language.

In 1976, as part of the Treaties of St. German and Brno and the Austrian Ethnic Groups Act, Slovaks were recognized as an autochthonous ethnicity, and freedom to use the Slovak language officially was permitted.

In recent years, many thousands of Slovaks have emigrated from Slovakia, mainly due to the open borders of the European Union. The population of Slovaks had increased by 800% in 2016.

== Notable Slovak Austrians ==
- Carl Ludwig Doleschall, scientist
- Jan Jesenius, physician and professor of anatomy
- Konstantin Jireček, politician and Slavist
- Boris Prokopič, footballer for SC Rheindorf Altach
- Ludwig Schwarz, bishop of the Diocese of Linz
- Tomáš Šimkovič, footballer for FC Tobol
- Thomas Vanek, ice hockey player for the NHL's Florida Panthers

== See also ==
- Austria–Slovakia relations
- Slovak diaspora
- Immigration to Austria
