= History of Czechs in Vienna =

The city of Vienna, Austria is home to a long-established Czech population. During the time of the Austro-Hungarian Empire in the late 1800s and early 1900s, Czechs were the largest non-German speaking population in Vienna. After the fall of the Austro-Hungarian Empire and the independence of Czechoslovakia, many of the Viennese Czechs returned to their homeland. Today, Vienna is home to a small Czech population that has grown in numbers since the Czech Republic's admission to the European Union in 2004.

== History ==
The city was part of the realm of King Ottokar II of Bohemia, considered one of the greatest rulers of Bohemia. In 1276, Ottokar II laid the foundation stone for the Gothic Minorites Church. After Ottokar II's death in the Battle on the Marchfeld, his embalmed body was initially kept in the Minorites Church before his burial in Prague, whereas his heart was buried in the Saint Catherine Chapel in Vienna.

A number of Czech noble families had residences in the city, with notable preserved examples including the Palais Kinsky, Palais Lobkowitz and Palais Chotek. History of Czech print media in Vienna dates back to the 18th century.

=== 20th century ===
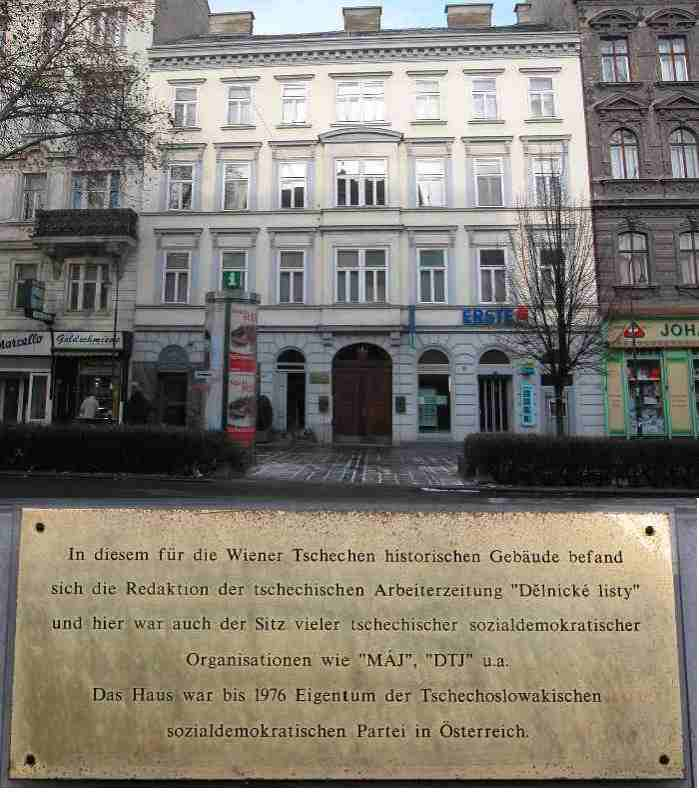
Former house of the Czech Socialists in Vienna, Margaretenplatz 7.

Around the start of the 20th century, Vienna (Czech Vídeň, Hungarian Bécs) was the city with the second-largest Czech population in the world (after Prague). At its peak, in 1900, out of 1,674,957 inhabitants of Vienna, 102,974 people claimed Czech or Slovak as their colloquial language. However, as Umgangssprache (everyday language) was not properly defined by the Austrian authorities, there are claims that the Czech minority numbered as high as 250,000-300,000, making Vienna a city with the second largest Czech speaking population, only after Prague. After World War I, many Czechs and other nationalities returned to their ancestral countries, resulting in a decline in the Viennese population.

Czechs were among the prisoners of the Vienna-Schönbrunn subcamp of the Mauthausen concentration camp operated in the city during World War II. After the war, the Soviets used force to repatriate key workers of Czech and Hungarian origins to return to their ethnic homelands to further the Soviet bloc economy.

In 1994, the Czech Centre in Vienna was founded.

=== 21st century ===
The number of Czech citizens in Vienna grew from 3,179 in 2013 to 4,215 in 2019. During the same period, the population born in the Czech Republic fell from 16,193 (2013) to 13,620 (2019).

== See also ==
- Czech print media in Vienna
- Czech schools in Vienna
