= Gorzów Wielkopolski =

City in Lubusz Voivodeship, Poland

- City county
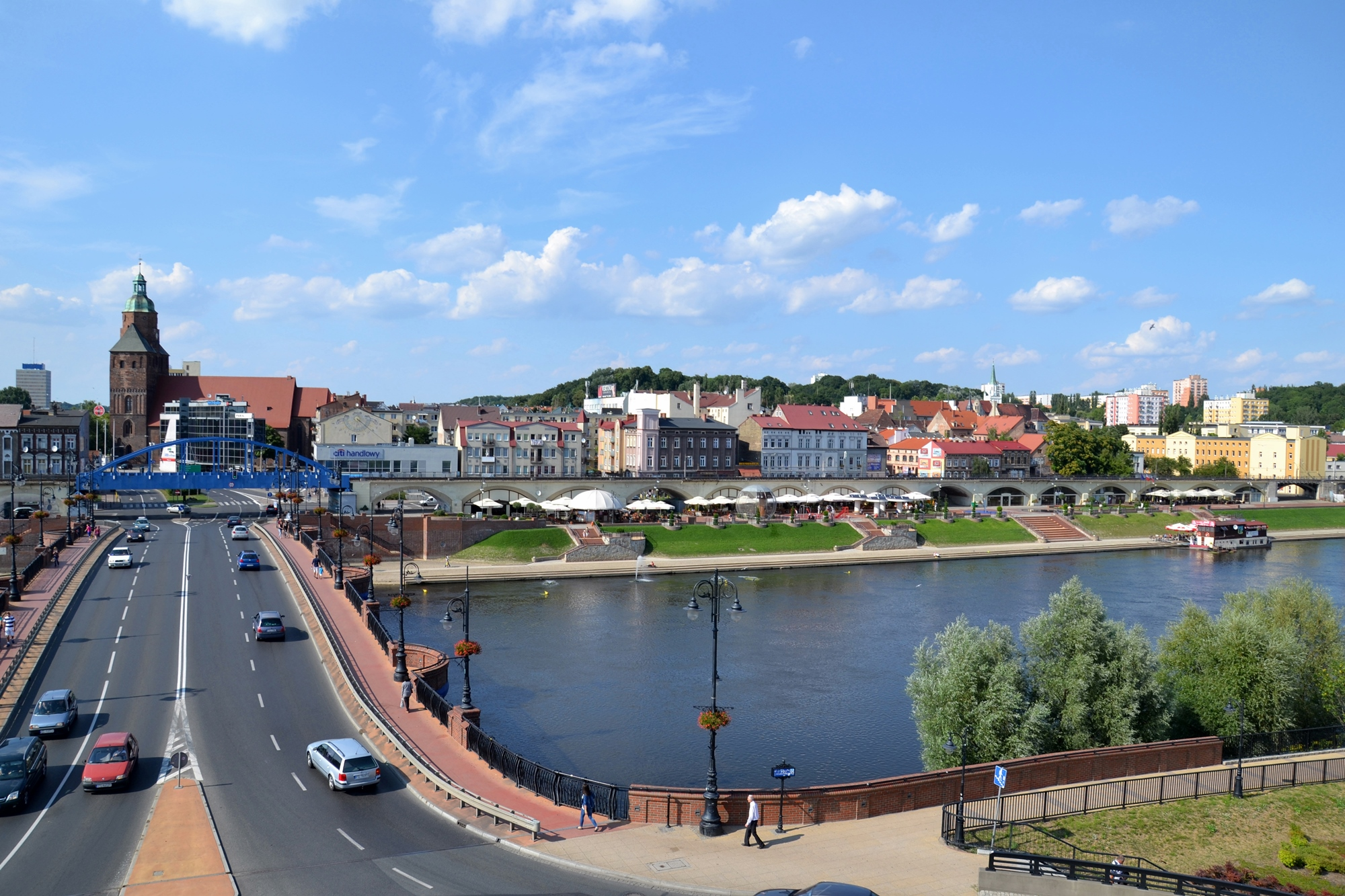
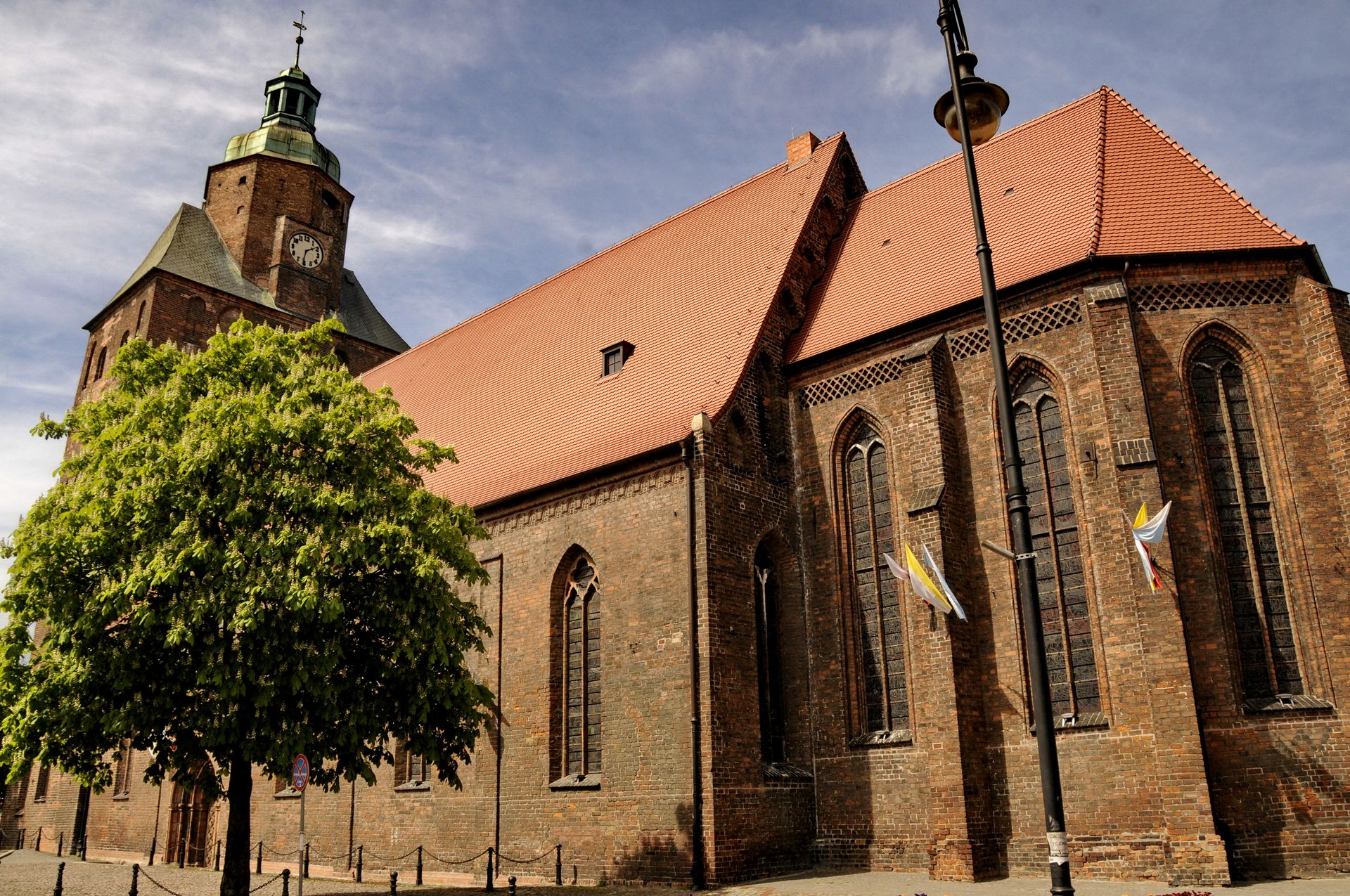
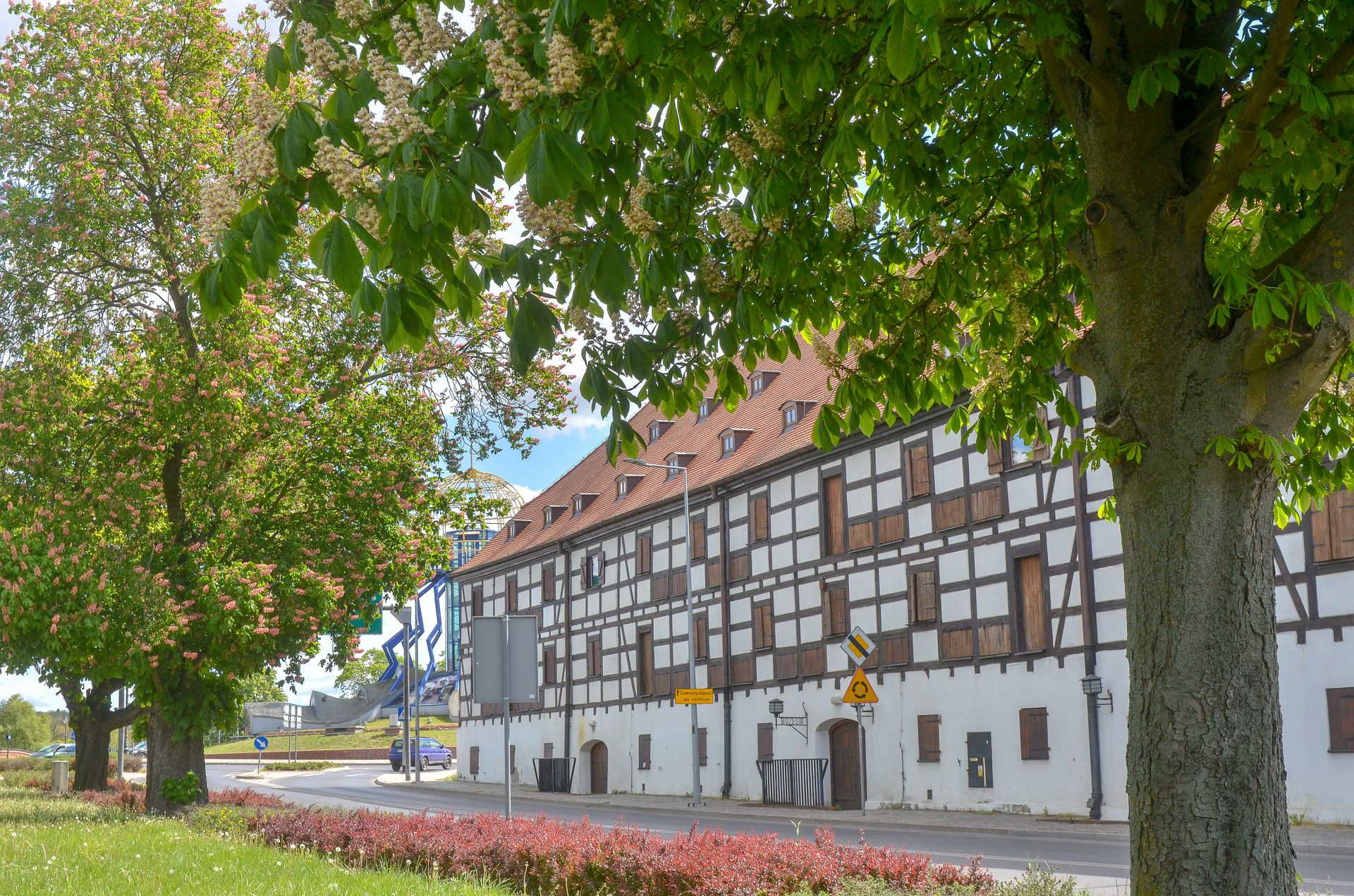
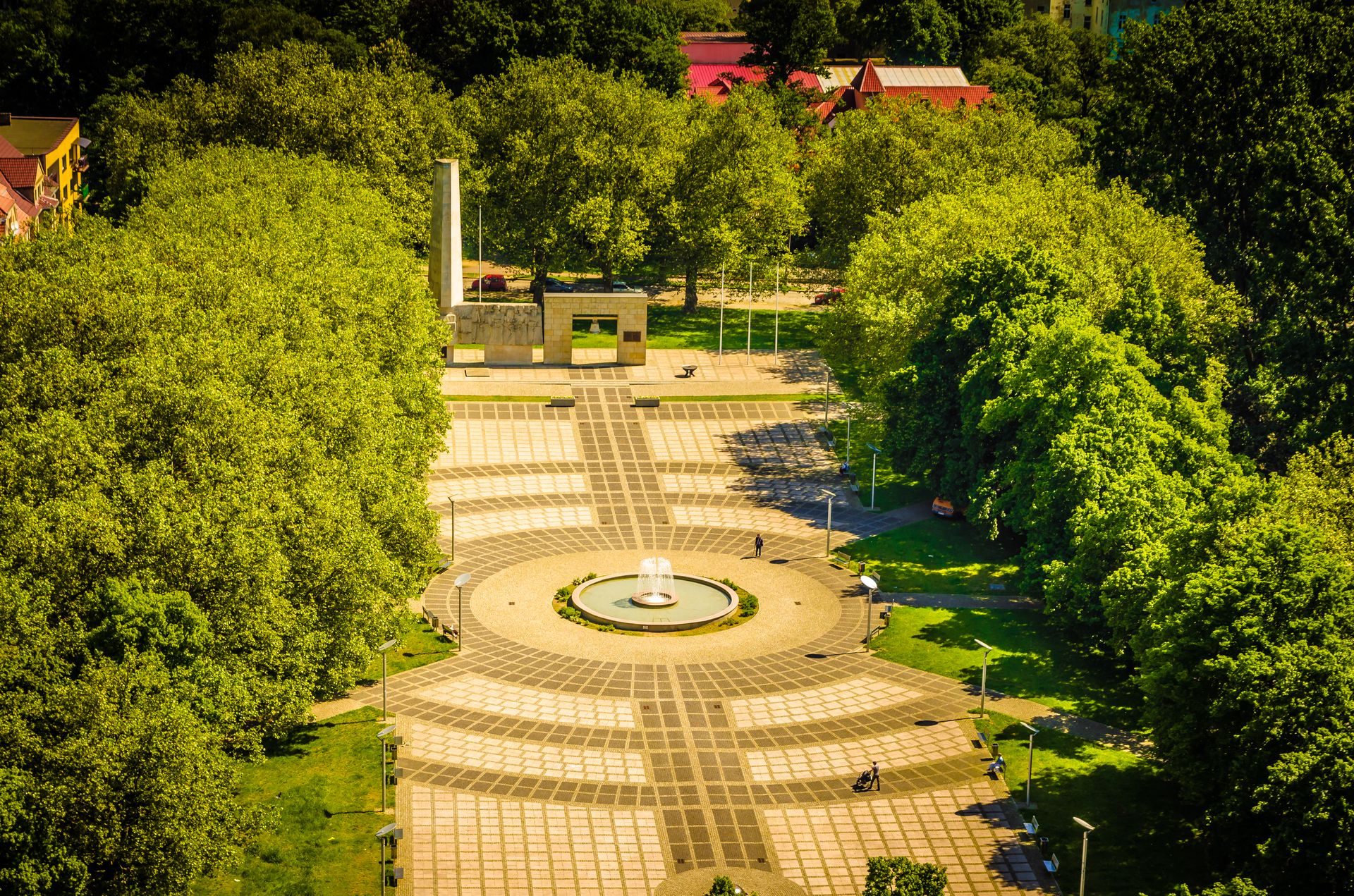
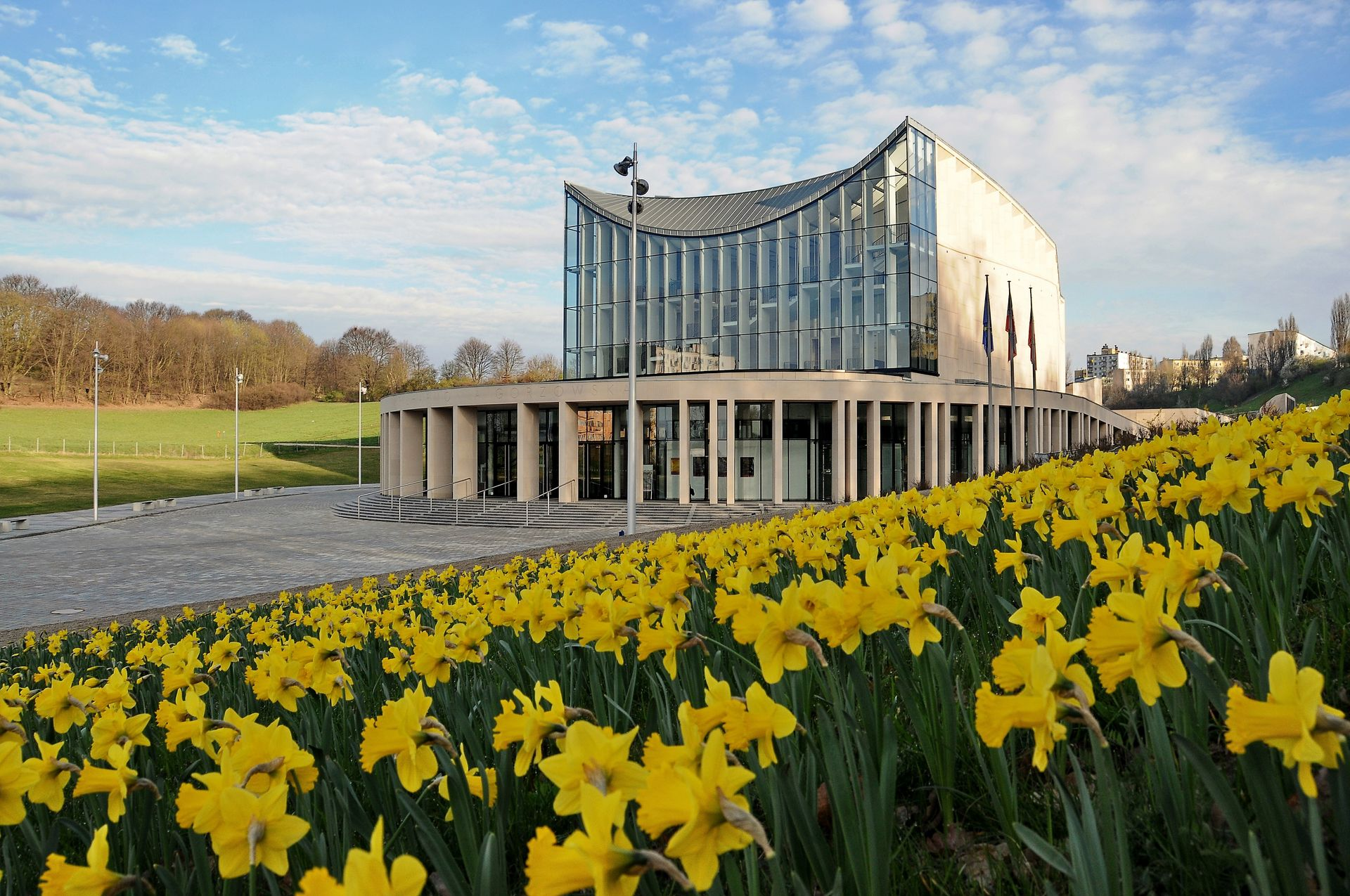
- Riverside boulevards and the Cathedral St. Mary's Cathedral City Granary Plac Grunwaldzki (Grunwald Square) Gorzów Philharmonic

- Flag Coat of arms
- Motto(s): Miasto wielu możliwości City of many opportunities
- Location within Poland
- Coordinates: 52°44′N 15°15′E
- Country: Poland
- Voivodeship: Lubusz
- County: city county
- Established: 13th century
- City rights: 1257

Government
  - City mayor: Jacek Wójcicki

Area
  - Total: 85.72 km^{2} (33.10 sq mi)
- Elevation: 19 m (62 ft)

Population (30 June 2024)
  - Total: 114,567 ▼ (29th)
  - Density: 1,344.46/km^{2} (3,482.1/sq mi)
- Time zone: UTC+1 (CET)
  - Summer (DST): UTC+2 (CEST)
- Postal code: 66-400 to 66-414
- Area code: +48 095
- Car plates: FG
- Climate: Cfb
- Website: www.gorzow.pl

Gorzów Wielkopolski (Polish pronunciation: [ˈɡɔʐuv vjɛlkɔˈpɔlskʲi]; formerly German: Landsberg an der Warthe), often simplified to Gorzów, is a city in western Poland, located on the Warta River. Alongside Zielona Góra, it is one of the two principal cities and seats of the Lubusz Voivodeship, with a population of 114,567 as of 30 June 2024.

The city has a history dating back to the 13th century and serves as a cultural, economic, and industrial hub in the region. Gorzów Wielkopolski is home to several historical landmarks, green spaces, and educational institutions, and is known for its strong tradition in speedway racing.

Around Gorzów, there are two large forest areas: Gorzów Woods to the north, where the Barlinek-Gorzów Landscape Park is situated, and Noteć Woods to the southeast. The biggest oil fields in Poland are located near Gorzów.

== Etymology ==
The pre-1945 German name Landsberg an der Warthe, dating back to 1257, derived from the German words land or 'state' and berg or 'mountain' combined with Warthe – the German name for the river Warta.

The Polish name Gorzów, written as Gorzew, is known from Polish maps and historical books dating back to the 19th century or perhaps earlier. The name appeared in a compendium called Ancient Poland according to its history, geography and statistics published in 1848 by Samuel Orgelbrand in Warsaw. Ten years earlier, in 1838, the same name Gorzew was used in a book published in Paris with a corresponding yet broader title encompassing all of Poland.

The current spelling of "Gorzów" appears on the map featuring "Królestwo Polskie" published in Lwów in 1900 with "Landsberg an der Warthe" in parentheses next to "Gorzów". The name is interpreted in several different ways according to rules of the Old Polish language, originating from "gorzenie" (fire, burning) or gora- gorze (mountain - of from the mountain) or "pogorzelcy" (survivors of a fire), or alternatively "gorzelnia" (distillery) or "gorzałka" (spirits).

The place originated as a craftsmen settlement during the medieval period of the Polish royal dynasty of Piast.

In Polish, it was the name 'Gorzów' which eventually stuck, beating the alternative postwar name "Kobylagóra", or 'Mare Mountain', which survives today as the name of a street in the city. Added later was the word Wielkopolski, meaning "Greater Polish", after the voivodeship of that name of which Gorzów was a part from 1946 to 1950. The area of today's Gorzów was part of the historical region of Greater Poland until the mid-13th century.

== History ==
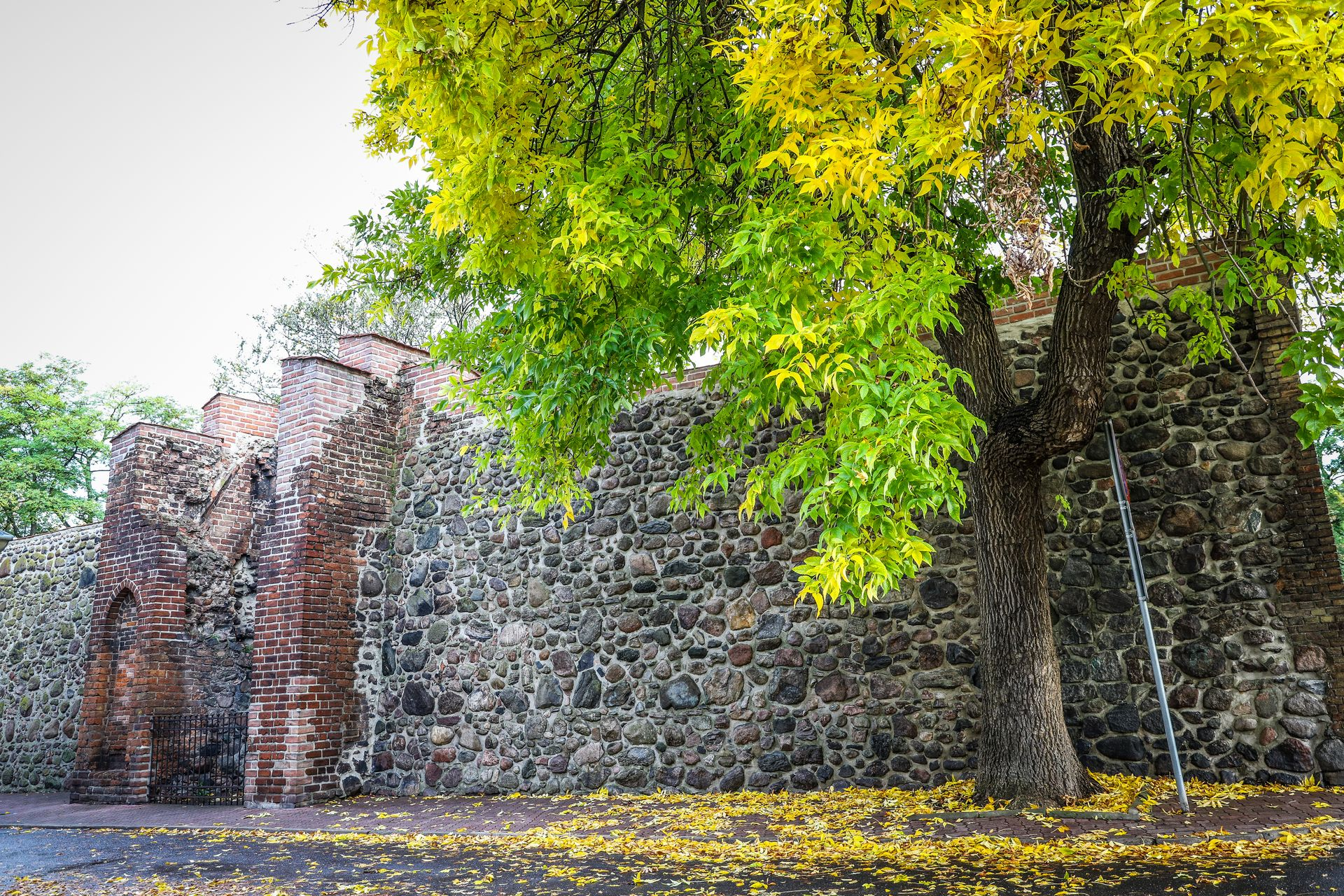
Preserved medieval town walls

During the reign of the first Polish monarchs of the Piast dynasty there was a craft and trade settlement and until the mid-13th century, the land where the river Kłodawka meets the Warta was the location of a defensive fort established by the Polish Piast dynasty. In 1249 the Silesian Duke Bolesław II Rogatka had sold Lubusz Land in the west to the Ascanian Margraves of Brandenburg, and the city of Landisberch Nova (named after Altlandsberg) was founded on the site in 1257. The city was at that time an eastern outpost of the newly established Neumark region of Brandenburg, close to the Greater Polish fortress of Santok. After a war broke out over control of the region in 1319, the town came under control of the Duchy of Pomerania, but by 1325 it fell to Brandenburg again. In 1325 Polish, in 1432 Hussite troops beleaguered the city. In 1373 the city became part of the Lands of the Bohemian Crown (or Czech Lands), ruled by the Luxembourg dynasty. In 1402, the Luxembourgs reached an agreement with Poland in Kraków. Poland was to buy and re-incorporate Gorzów and the surrounding region, but eventually the Luxembourgs sold the city to the Teutonic Order. In 1454, after the Thirteen Years’ War broke out, the Teutonic Knights sold the city to Brandenburg in order to raise funds for war against Poland. In the 16th century, the city became Lutheran, with St. Mary's Cathedral changing its allegiance in 1537.

In 1701 Landsberg (Gorzów) became part of the Kingdom of Prussia. On 4 February 1813 during the Napoleonic Wars the Russian Ataman Aleksandr Chernichev and his Cossack troops defeated a French battalion of 1,500 men of Louis-Nicolas Davout's corps. In 1815 – in the course of an administrative restructuring – the town became part of Prussia's Province of Brandenburg. One of the main escape routes for surviving insurgents of the Polish November Uprising from partitioned Poland to the Great Emigration led through the city. The city, like all of Prussia, was included in the German Empire in 1871 during the unification of Germany.

Historical population
Year	Pop.	±%
1950	32,825	—
1960	58,671	+78.7%
1970	74,782	+27.5%
1980	105,909	+41.6%
1990	124,285	+17.4%
2000	125,767	+1.2%
2010	125,394	−0.3%
2020	122,589	−2.2%

During World War II, the Germans established nine forced labour camps, as well as four labour units of the Stalag III-C prisoner-of-war camp for French, Italian and Soviet prisoners of war in the city.

In early 1945 during World War II the town was heavily damaged following the retreat of the Wehrmacht ahead of the Soviet Red Army. The Red Army arrived in the city on 30 January 1945, approaching from the left bank of the river Warta. The Wehrmacht had already evacuated most of the city, and the advancing forces met very little resistance. Over the next few days, most of the city centre was destroyed, reportedly through the accidental spread of a fire started in order to light the westward march of the Red Army.

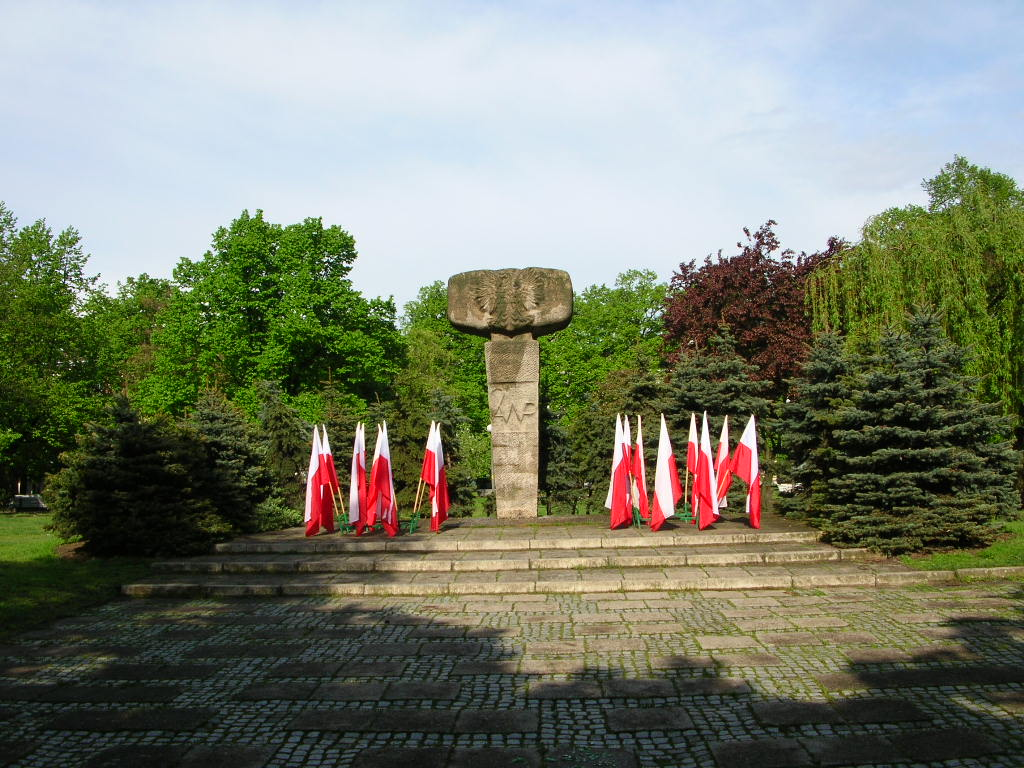
Second Polish Army Memorial

The city became part of Poland in accordance with border changes promulgated at the postwar Potsdam Conference, supposedly pending a final peace conference with Germany. Since a peace conference never took place, the town was effectively ceded to Poland. German residents who had not fled or died in the war were expelled, and the city was gradually repopulated with Polish settlers from central Poland and those expelled from Polish territory that became part of the Soviet Union. The last German inhabitants were forced to leave the city in the early 1950s. It was at this time that Gorzów's now sizable Tatar and Romani communities arrived in the town. Not having had an agreed Polish name, the town was initially renamed as "Kobylagóra" on 30 May 1945, later as "Gorzów nad Wartą" on 7 July 1945 and finally "Gorzów Wielkopolski" on 5 November 1946.

Between 1975 and 1998, it was the capital of the Gorzów Voivodeship.

== Climate ==
Gorzów Wielkopolski has an oceanic climate (Köppen climate classification: Cfb) using the −3 °C (27 °F) isotherm or a humid continental climate (Köppen climate classification: Dfb) using the 0 °C (32 °F) isotherm.

Climate data for Gorzów Wielkopolski (1991–2020 normals, extremes 1951–present)
Month	Jan	Feb	Mar	Apr	May	Jun	Jul	Aug	Sep	Oct	Nov	Dec	Year
Record high °C (°F)	16.6 (61.9)	18.2 (64.8)	24.6 (76.3)	30.6 (87.1)	31.5 (88.7)	38.7 (101.7)	37.5 (99.5)	37.3 (99.1)	33.0 (91.4)	28.7 (83.7)	20.3 (68.5)	15.3 (59.5)	38.7 (101.7)
Mean daily maximum °C (°F)	2.4 (36.3)	4.1 (39.4)	8.3 (46.9)	14.9 (58.8)	19.5 (67.1)	22.7 (72.9)	24.8 (76.6)	24.5 (76.1)	19.3 (66.7)	13.3 (55.9)	6.9 (44.4)	3.4 (38.1)	13.7 (56.7)
Daily mean °C (°F)	−0.1 (31.8)	0.9 (33.6)	4.1 (39.4)	9.5 (49.1)	14.0 (57.2)	17.3 (63.1)	19.4 (66.9)	19.0 (66.2)	14.3 (57.7)	9.2 (48.6)	4.3 (39.7)	1.1 (34.0)	9.4 (48.9)
Mean daily minimum °C (°F)	−2.4 (27.7)	−1.7 (28.9)	0.6 (33.1)	4.5 (40.1)	8.8 (47.8)	12.2 (54.0)	14.3 (57.7)	14.0 (57.2)	10.1 (50.2)	5.9 (42.6)	2.0 (35.6)	−1.0 (30.2)	5.6 (42.1)
Record low °C (°F)	−24.6 (−12.3)	−27.1 (−16.8)	−19.3 (−2.7)	−5.7 (21.7)	−2.4 (27.7)	1.8 (35.2)	5.9 (42.6)	4.5 (40.1)	−0.5 (31.1)	−6.4 (20.5)	−15.4 (4.3)	−22.2 (−8.0)	−27.1 (−16.8)
Average precipitation mm (inches)	41.9 (1.65)	34.6 (1.36)	39.4 (1.55)	29.5 (1.16)	57.0 (2.24)	56.7 (2.23)	75.0 (2.95)	56.8 (2.24)	45.5 (1.79)	40.4 (1.59)	38.4 (1.51)	41.6 (1.64)	556.8 (21.92)
Average extreme snow depth cm (inches)	3.8 (1.5)	4.0 (1.6)	2.0 (0.8)	0.5 (0.2)	0.0 (0.0)	0.0 (0.0)	0.0 (0.0)	0.0 (0.0)	0.0 (0.0)	0.0 (0.0)	1.0 (0.4)	3.1 (1.2)	4.0 (1.6)
Average precipitation days (≥ 0.1 mm)	16.93	14.44	14.27	10.93	12.67	12.37	13.70	12.23	11.57	14.47	15.10	17.77	166.44
Average snowy days (≥ 0 cm)	11.8	9.4	3.1	0.2	0.0	0.0	0.0	0.0	0.0	0.1	1.3	5.7	31.6
Average relative humidity (%)	88.4	83.9	77.3	67.7	68.2	68.6	69.5	70.4	77.8	84.4	90.3	90.0	78.0
Mean monthly sunshine hours	50.0	72.9	125.9	206.1	244.8	251.1	253.9	236.4	162.9	110.1	49.5	39.6	1,803
Source 1: Institute of Meteorology and Water Management
Source 2: Meteomodel.pl (records, relative humidity 1991–2020)

== Main attractions ==
Although the centre of Gorzów was heavily damaged during the Second World War, there are still many notable tourist attractions in the city. The largest of these is the Gothic, red brick Gorzów Cathedral of the Virgin Mary, dating from the end of the 13th century, situated on the old market square. The city centre is overwhelmingly occupied by Communist-era buildings, although many have been beautified, most notably those around the old market square. Many of the façades of the buildings in the centre were renovated in anticipation of the visit of Pope John Paul II to Gorzów in 1997. Due to the high number of parks and green spaces, Gorzów has been termed 'the city of parks and gardens'. In addition to the central Park of Roses, there is also a viewing area on the hilltop of Siemiradzki Park which commands impressive views across the plains and woods to the south of the city.

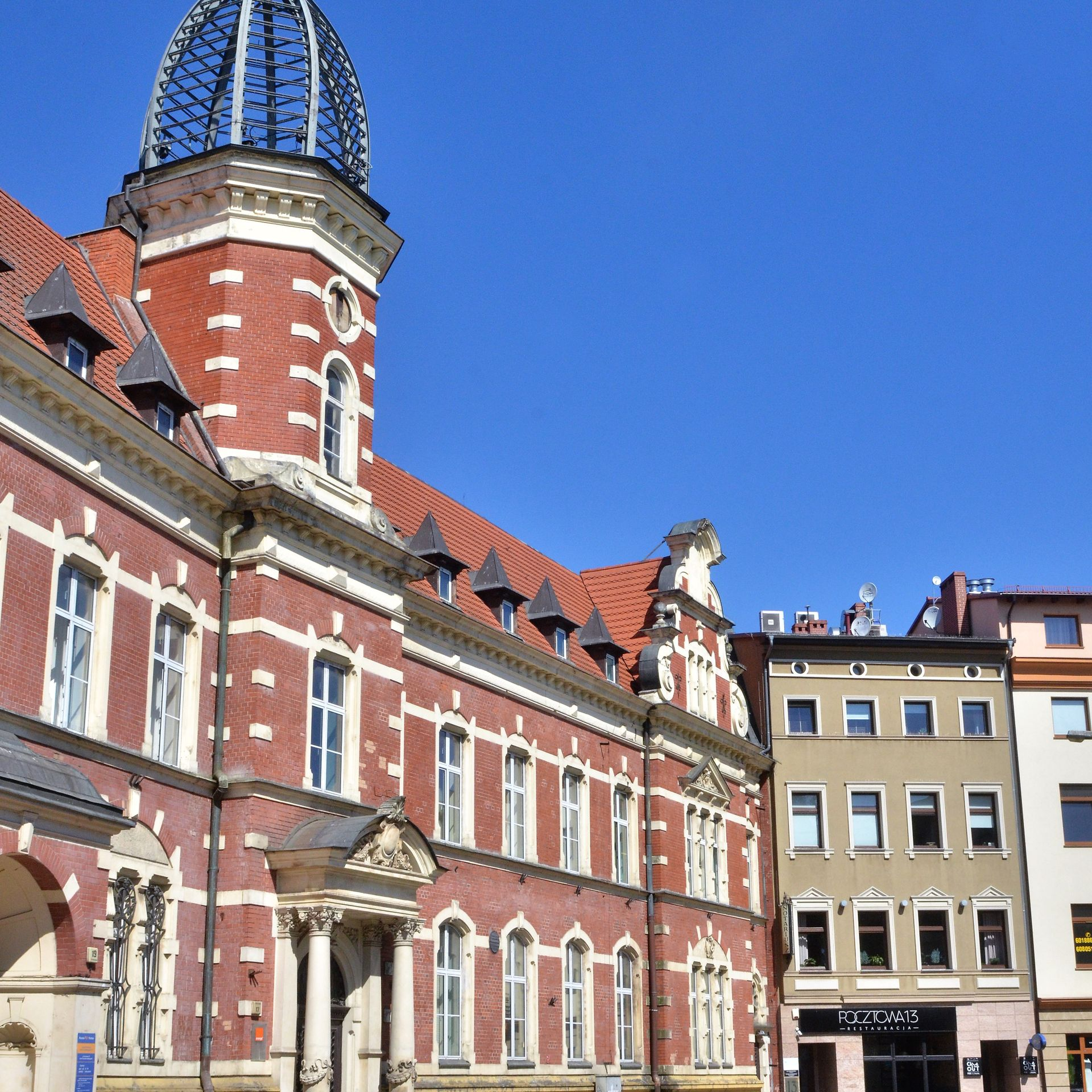
Historic building of the Polish Post

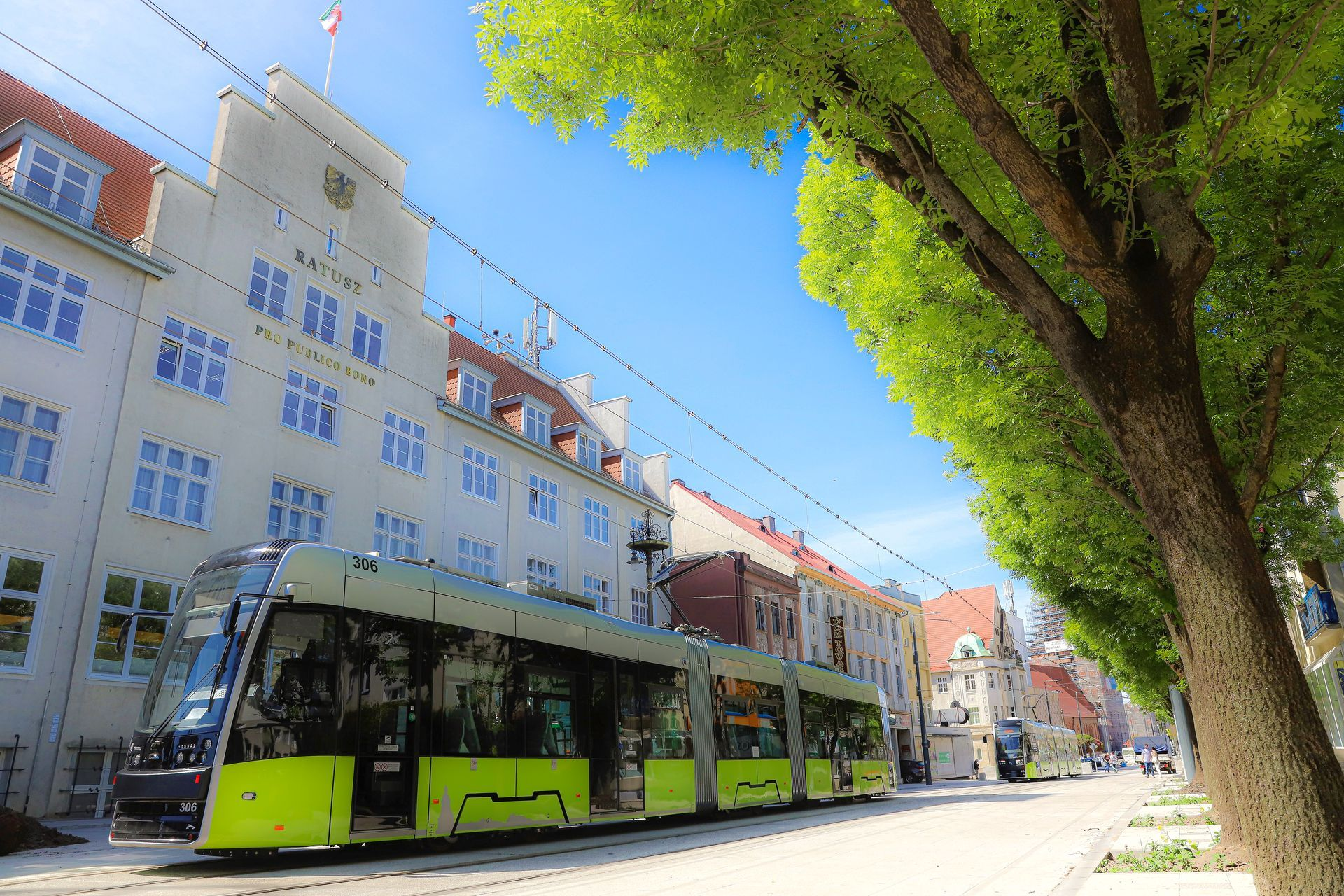
Town hall

The city also contains the museum of Lubusz Voivodeship, which is divided between two sites. The Spichlerz or 'granary' dates from the 18th century and can be found on the left bank of the Warta. The museum, housed inside, frequently plays host to art exhibitions and has a permanent collection of artifacts and photographs relating to the history of the city. The other part of the museum, on Warszawska street, is housed in the secessionist villa of Gustav Schroeder. This section contains a wide range of artifacts, ranging from portraits of the 17th century, to weapons, pottery, and the Biedermeier interior furnishings of the villa itself.

Kuna, the world's oldest in service river icebreaker, is docked in the river port of Gorzów and is open to the public as a museum ship.

The Old Town was almost completely destroyed, but the New Town (19th century) has survived in good condition as a complex of hundreds of buildings and is in the Heritage Register. For the past few years, historical tenements have been successfully undergoing renovation.

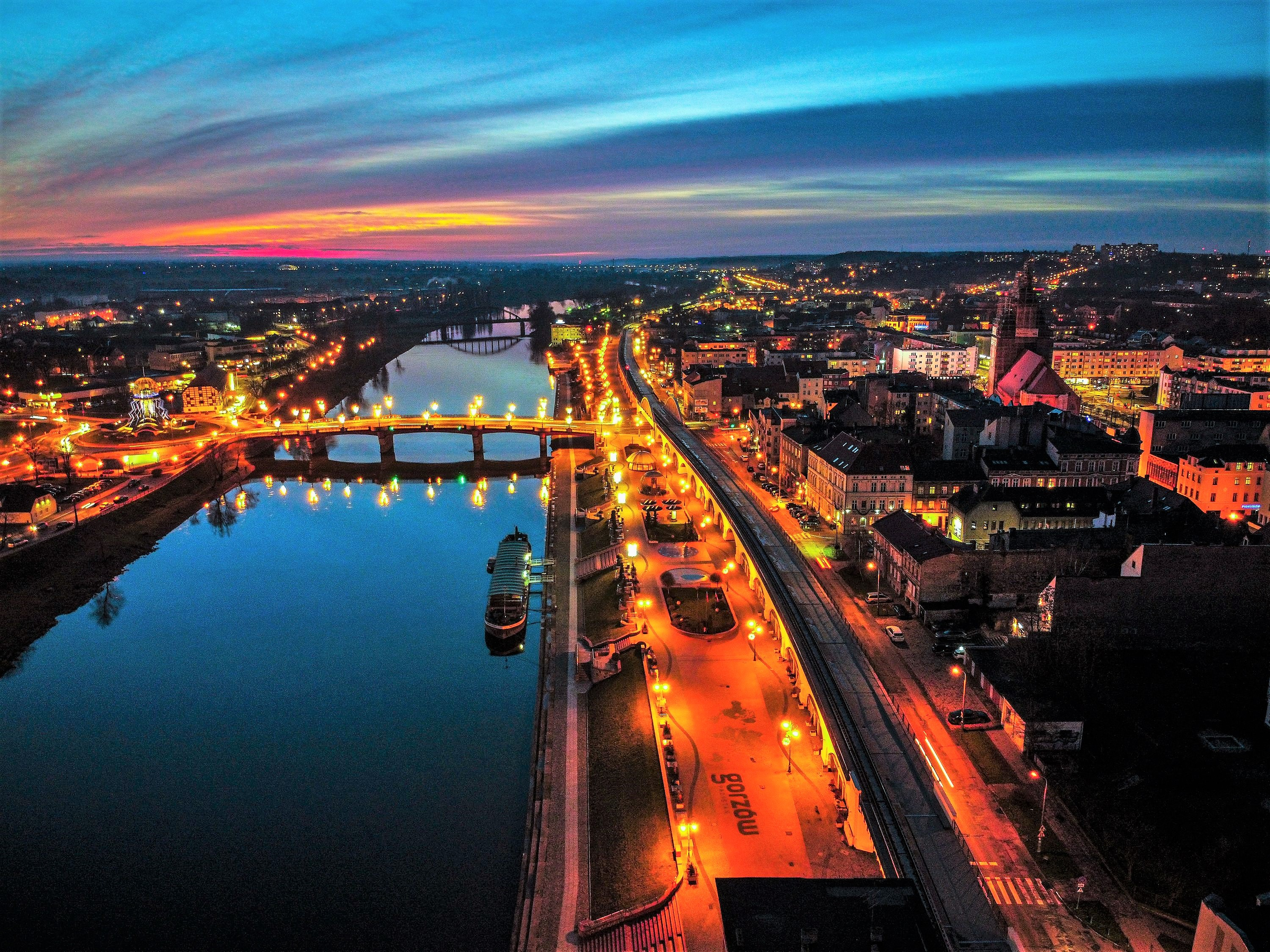
Aerial view of the city centre

The Jewish cemetery of Gorzów is on the western edge of the city. The cemetery was vandalised in the 1930s, but some of the graves remain intact to this day.

== Politics ==
In recent years Gorzów Wielkopolski has been known for former Prime Minister Kazimierz Marcinkiewicz, who was born and worked here. After stepping down as the PM he was appointed as acting mayor of Warsaw and then as a counsel to a chairman of PKO BP bank. In 2007 he became one of the directors of the European Bank for Reconstruction and Development. He now works for Goldman Sachs.

== Economy ==
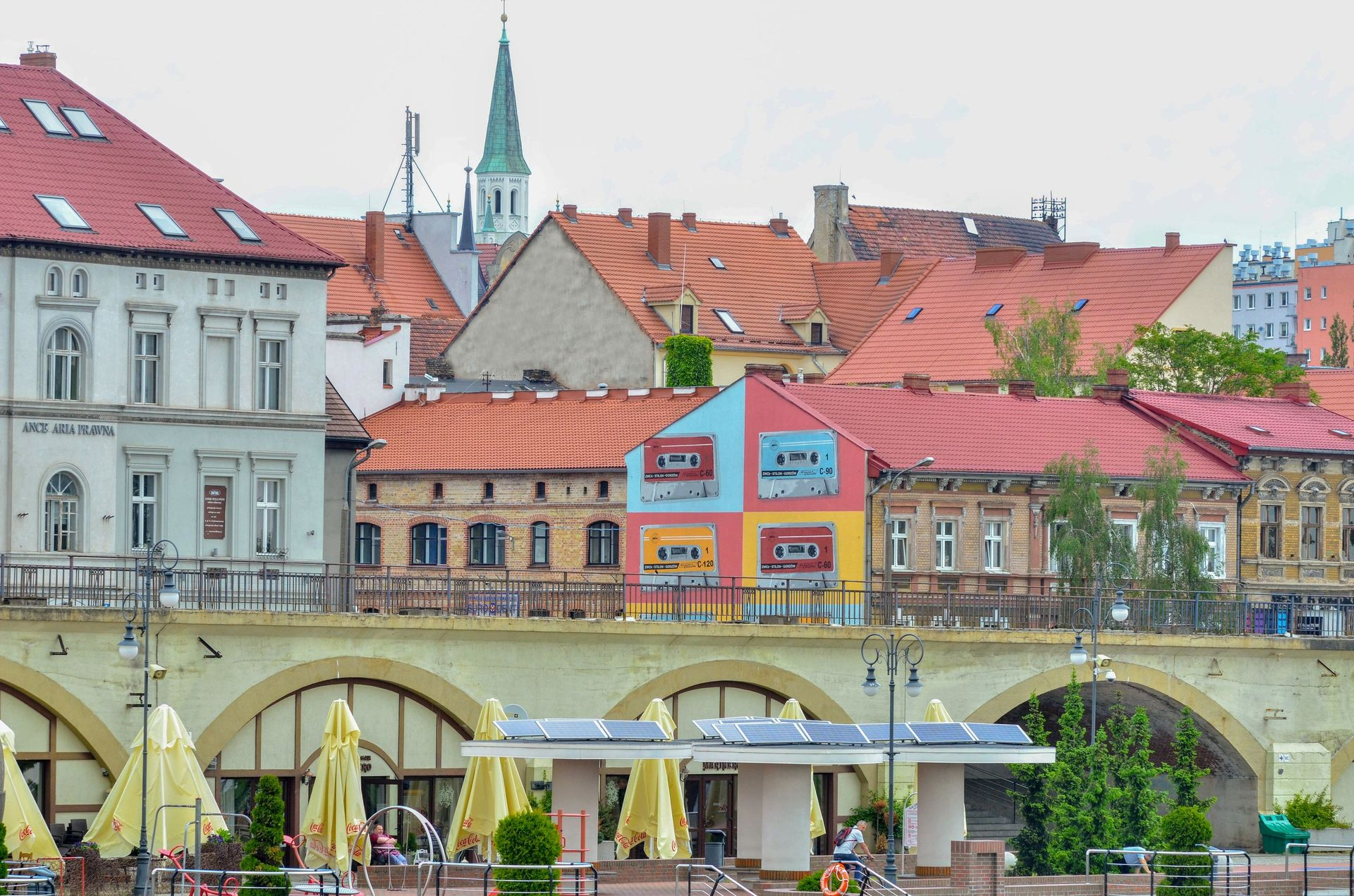
Warta Boulevard and the city centre

Gorzów is an economic centre of the region with almost 18,000 registered businesses as of 2008, while the unemployment rate was 7.6% as of December 2009. The city of Gorzów is a laureate of the "'Fair Play Commune' — Certified Investment Location" competition in the "Large Cities" category. The city has a good shopping and services infrastructure. There are numerous petrol stations, branches of all major banks and insurance companies as well as car dealers.

Major shopping malls in the city are Nova Park, Galeria Askana, Panorama, Park 111, there is one Tesco hypermarket and many discount and department stores and retailers.

Landsberg an der Warthe before World War II was a very well-developed and industrialized city. The most notable entrepreneurs included industrialists Max Bahr and Herman Paucksch. After World War II, the city suffered from heavy losses, especially in machinery which was confiscated by the Soviets.

In the postwar time, Gorzów saw a fast economic development, and new industries were founded like Stilon (chemical fibres), Silwana (fabrics), and Ursus (tractors) who remained major employers up to the mid-1990s. After Leszek Balcerowicz's free-market reforms former state-owned companies either went bankrupt or had severe financial problems that resulted in radical employment and production reduction. In the 1990s and 2000s the city saw a new economic age. While public giants were collapsing new private companies were established. Currently, the biggest employer in the city is Sumitomo Electric Bordnetze Sp. z o.o. (previously Volkswagen Elektro-Systemy Sp. z o.o.), car wiring systems. The then-German company established in Gorzów in 1993 (taken over by Japanese Sumitomo Electric in 2006), it operates in the Stilon industrial estate. Gorzów Heat and Power Plant (Elektrociepłownia Gorzów) is a modern company with over 300 staff and it holds an award of Fair Play Company. One of the most distinguished employers is Biowet Vetoquinol which has over 100 years of experience in veterinary medicines and chemistry. manufacturing. Gorzów is the Polish headquarters of Spartherm Feuerungstechnik GmbH.

The recent economic development of the city was boosted by the creation of Kostrzyn-Słubice Special Economic Zone and its Subzone Gorzów. At present, there are two significant employers in the Subzone: Faurecia, TPV Displays, and many other smaller companies operating there.

== Transport ==
Public transport

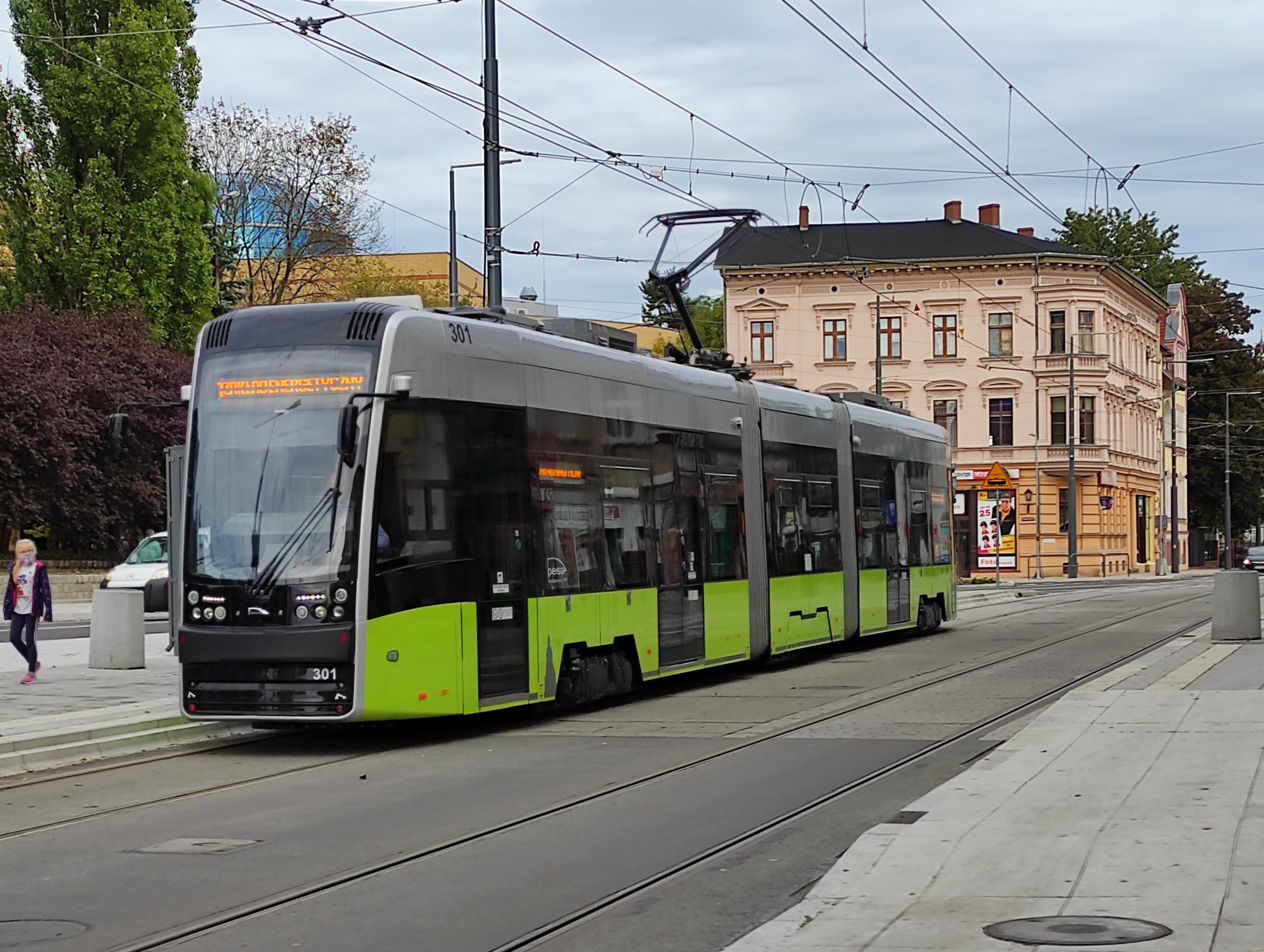
Pesa Twist tram

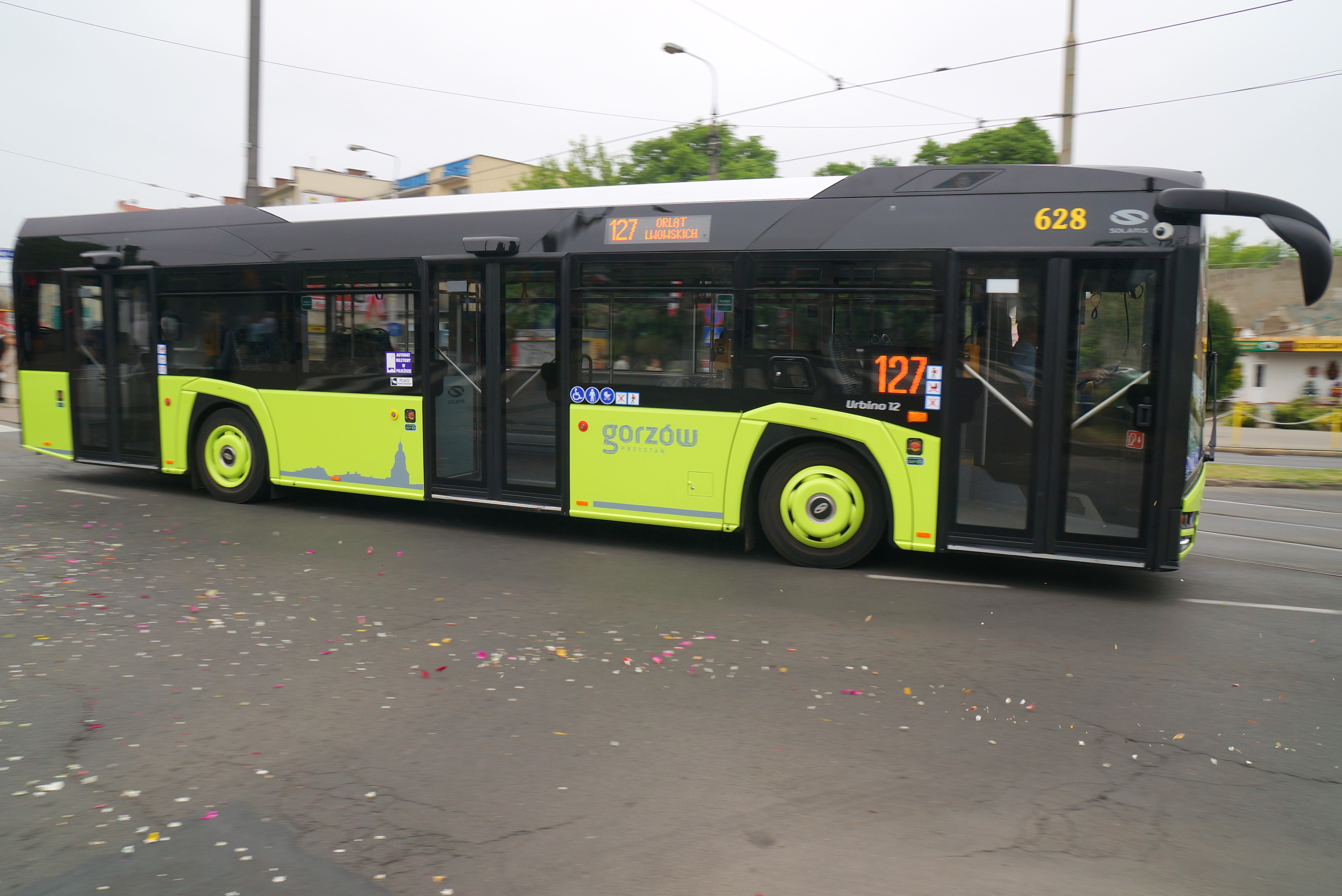
Solaris Urbino 12 city bus

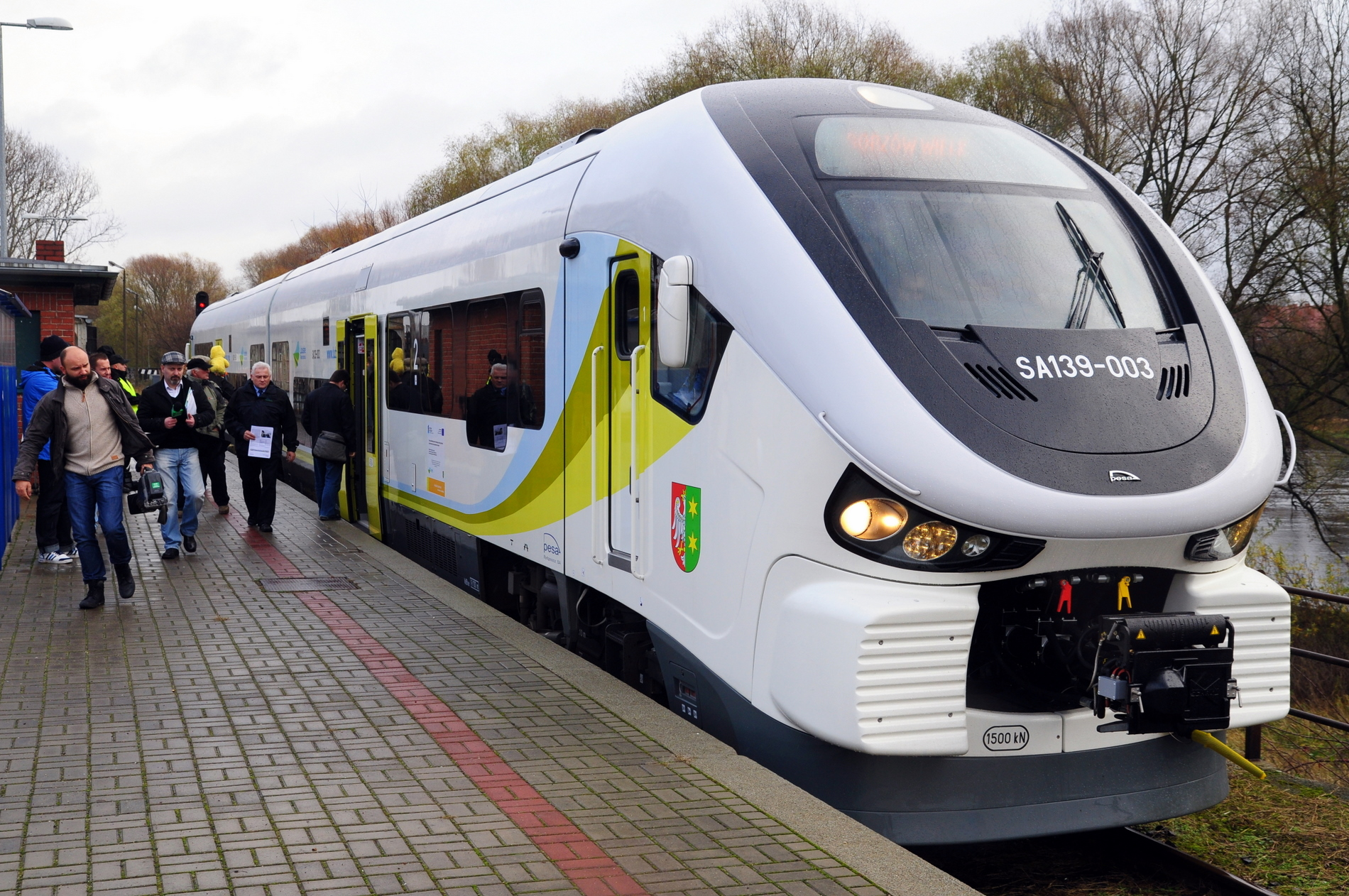
Pesa Link train

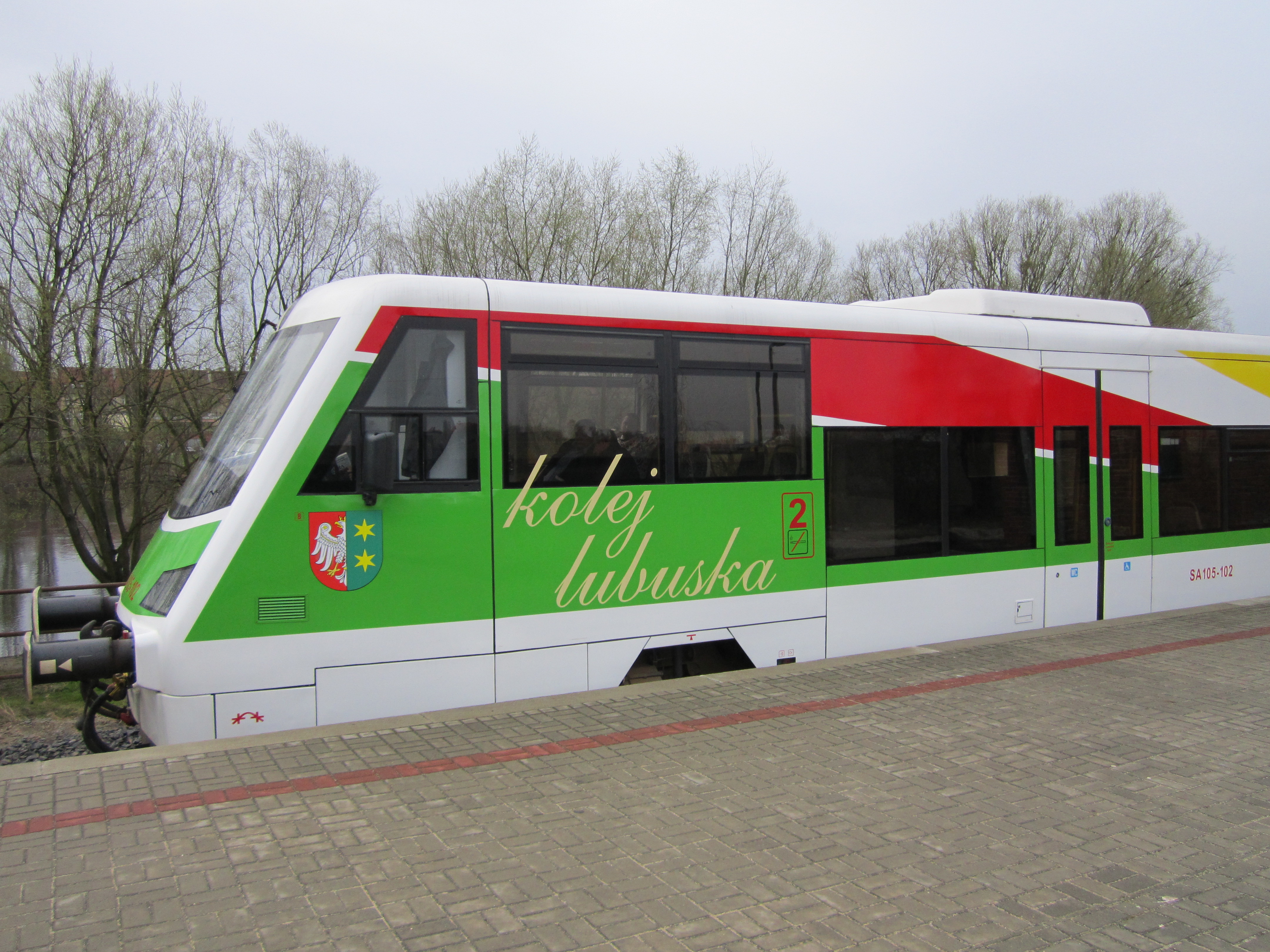
Railbus

Gorzów has a good public transport network. City Transport Company (MZK) which is in charge of transport services runs 27 daily bus lines, four night lines, and four tram lines. In the summer season, there are services to nearby lakes. MZK services carry about 90,000 people every day. The company owns one of the most modern bus fleets in Poland.

Since 2026, residents will be able to use the city's local transport free of charge.

There are railway connections with major Polish cities, mostly with interchange in Krzyż or Kostrzyn. There are plans to start fast through trains to Poznań, Szczecin, Wrocław and Berlin. The Gorzów main station was renovated in 2009 and 2010, and it offers bed and breakfast, restaurant and retail services.

There is no airport in the city. The nearest airports are Solidarity Szczecin–Goleniów Airport, located 133 km (83 mi) north and Poznań–Ławica Airport, located 167 km (104 mi) south east of Gorzów Wielkopolski.

The S3 expressway provides a fast road connection to Szczecin and Zielona Góra.

== Culture ==
Cultural institutions of Gorzów

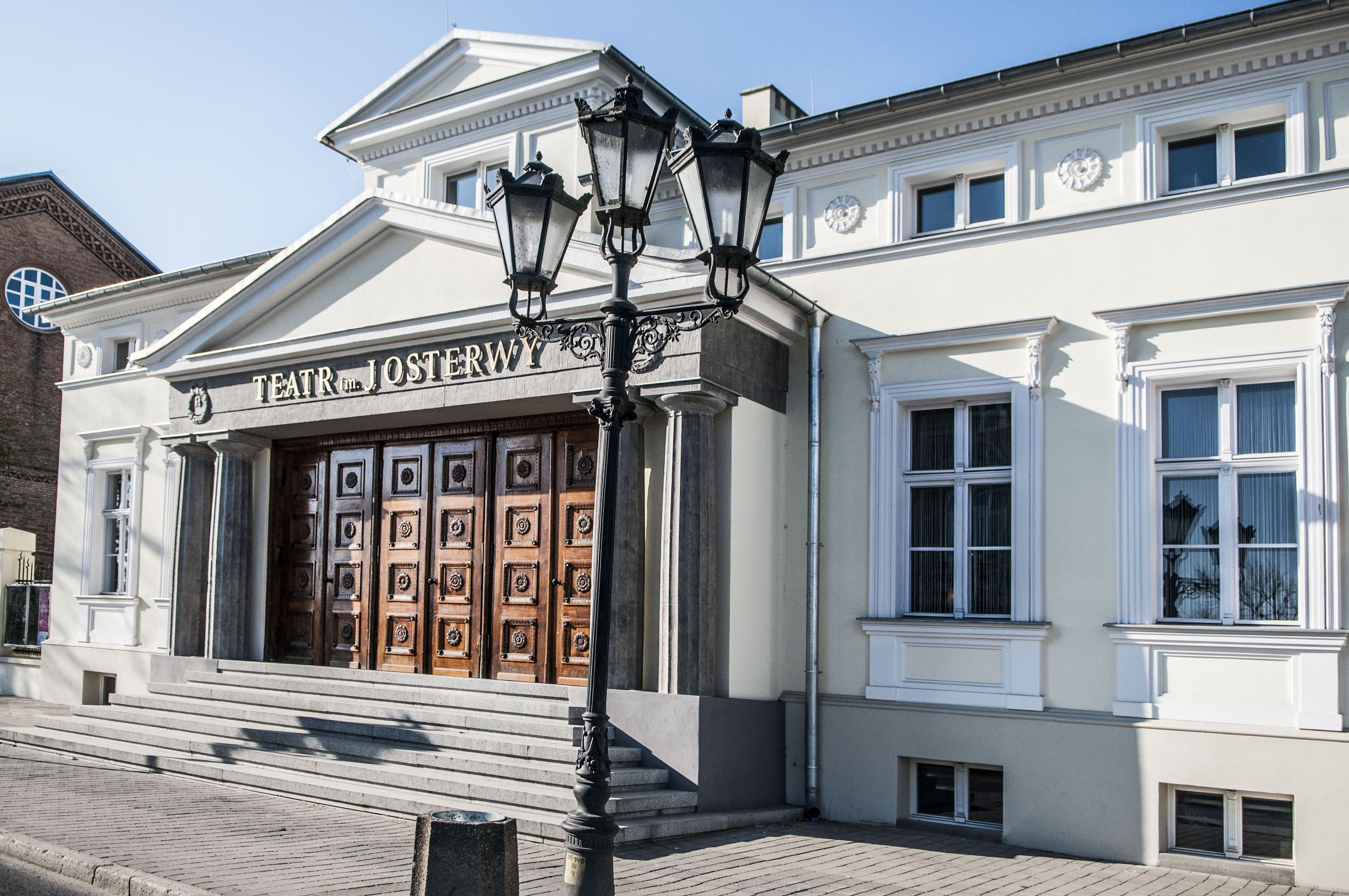
Juliusz Osterwa Theatre

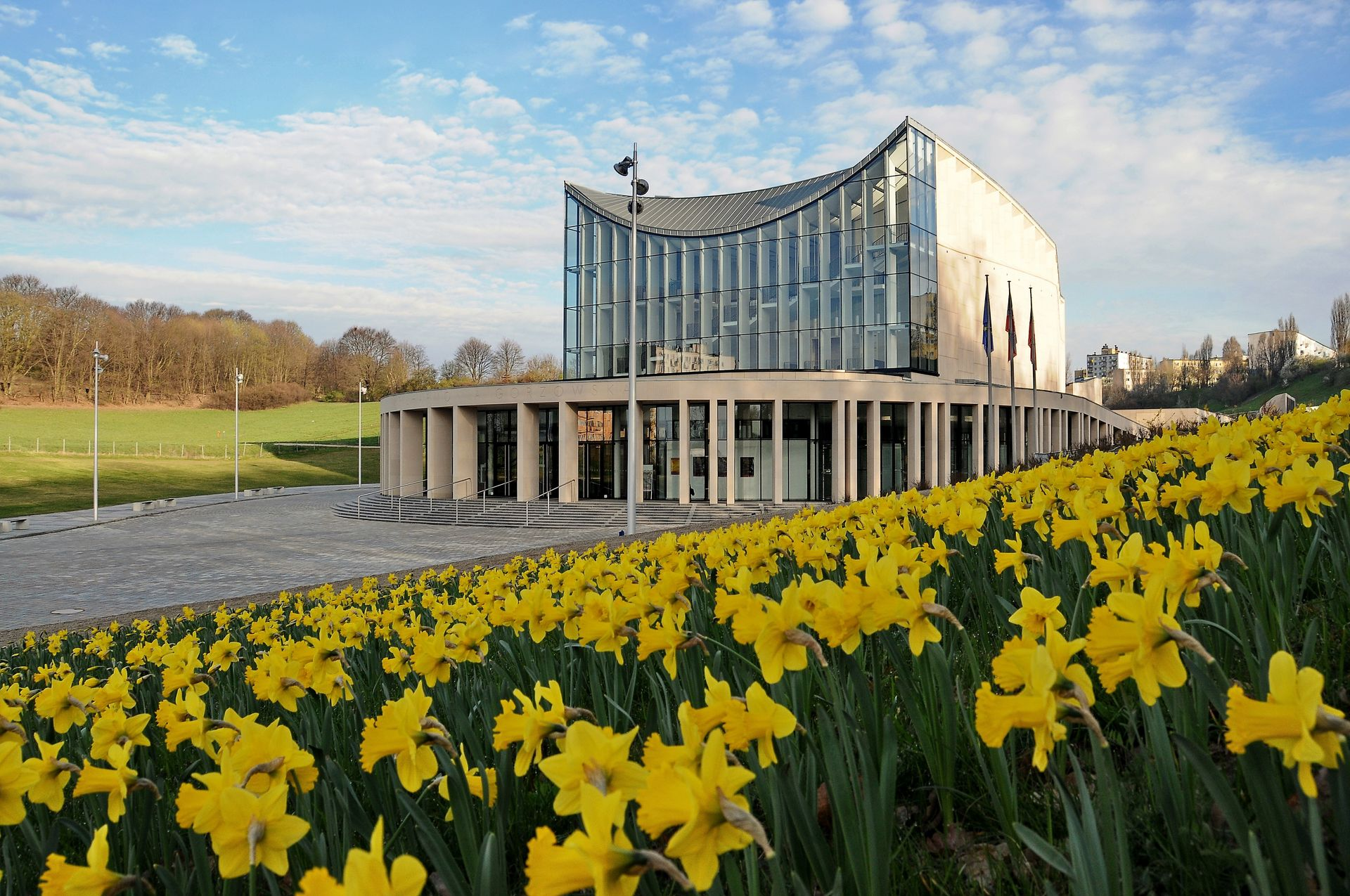
Gorzów Philharmonic

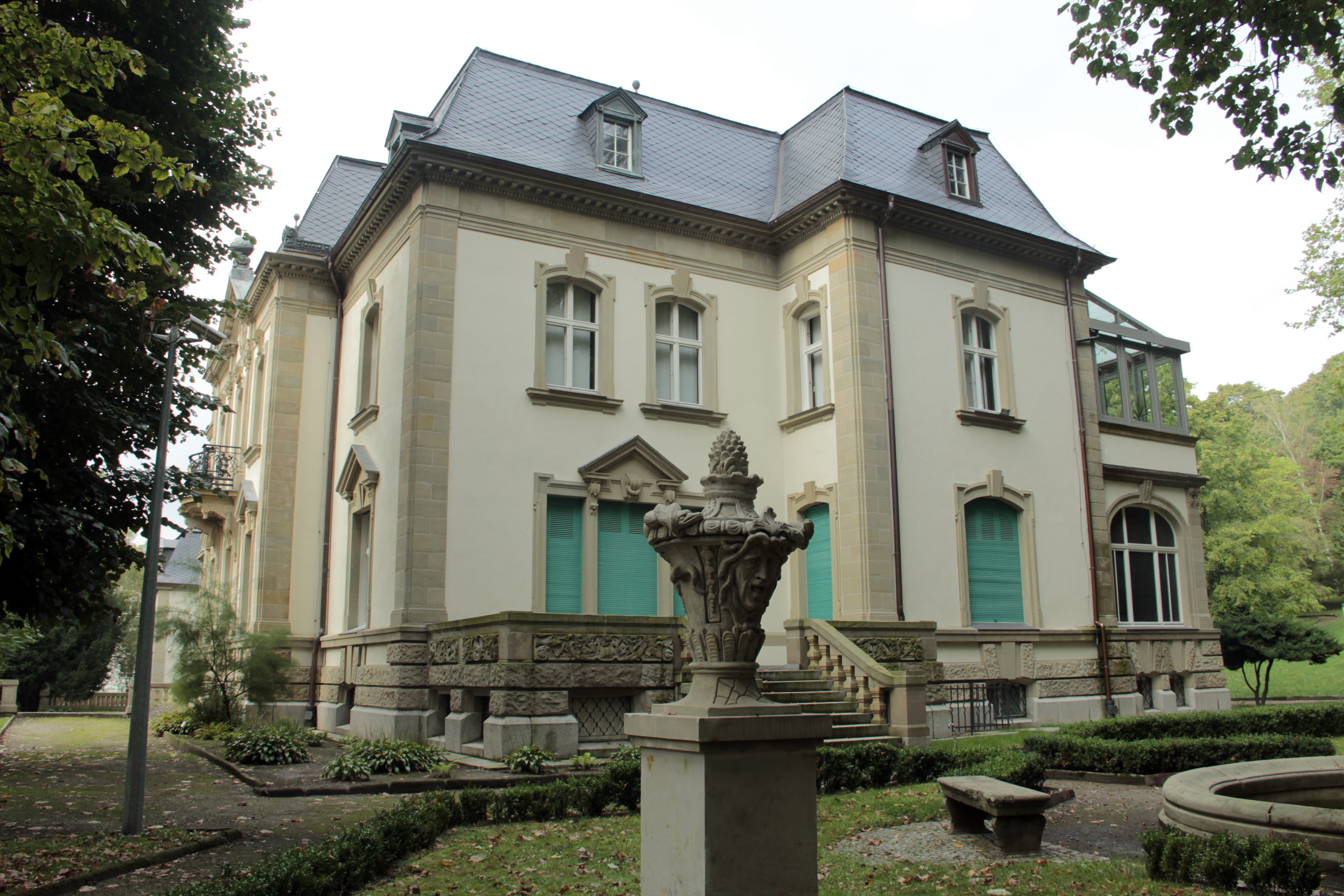
Museum of Ancient Art

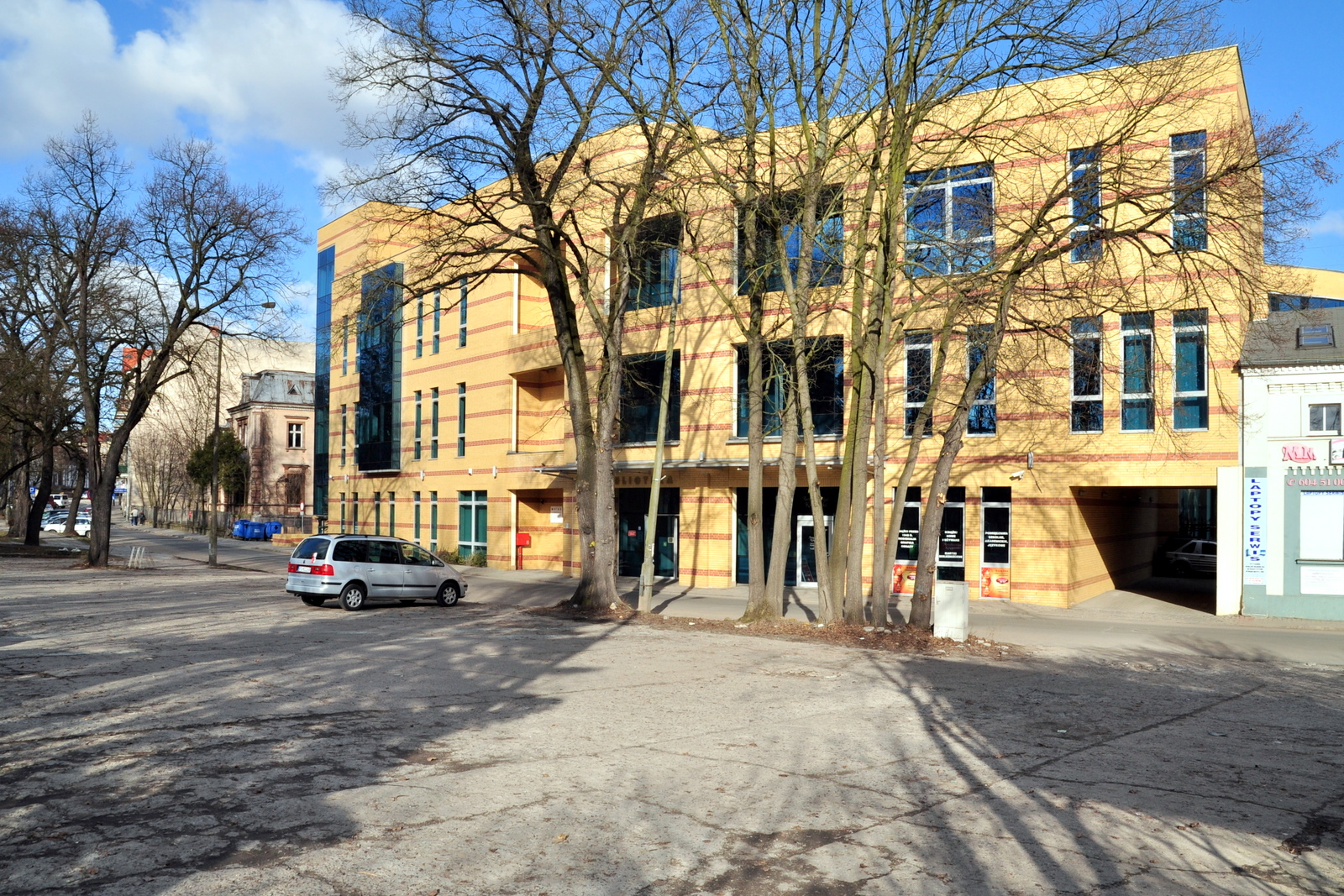
Provincial and Municipal Public Library

Gorzów is well known for the International Romani Gathering Romane Dyvesa which is held every summer in the first week of July. The gathering includes a series of concerts held in the outdoor amphitheatre near the centre of the city. The festival is organised by Edward Dębicki, the founder of the Romani music group Terno, which also performs as part of the series of concerts.

Romane Dyvesa continues Gorzów's strong tradition of Romani culture, of which the most widely known member was the poet Bronisława Wajs, often known as Papusza. Wajs's former home on Kosynierów Gdyńskich Street is marked with a plaque, as is the main city library on Sikorskiego Street. The library itself holds a collection of books about Papusza, as well as the manuscripts of her correspondence with Julian Tuwim. In Poland, the city is known for its Jazz Club Pod Filarami which every autumn organizes Gorzów Jazz Celebrations a festival which hosts internationally recognized musicians from Poland and around the world.

=== Religion ===
The city is predominantly Roman-Catholic, with an Eastern Orthodox church, an Old Catholic (Polish Catholic) congregation and a number of Protestant (Baptist, Pentecostal/neo-Pentecostal, Lutheran) as well as the (Restorationist, non-mainstream Protestant) Jehovah's Witnesses congregations present there. It is home to the house general of the Congregation of Sisters of Merciful Jesus. Its first monastery is in nearby Myślibórz.

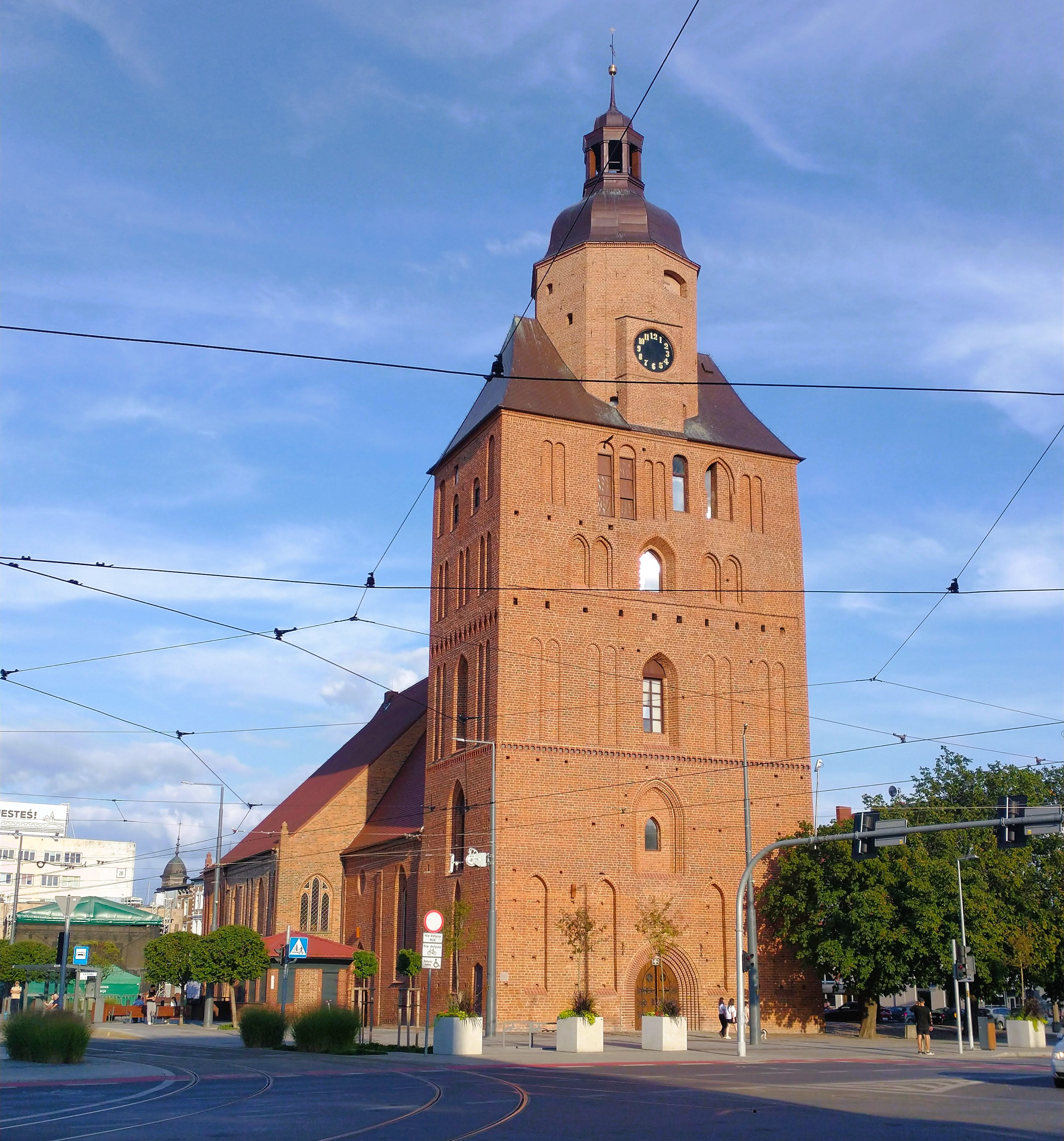
Gorzów Cathedral

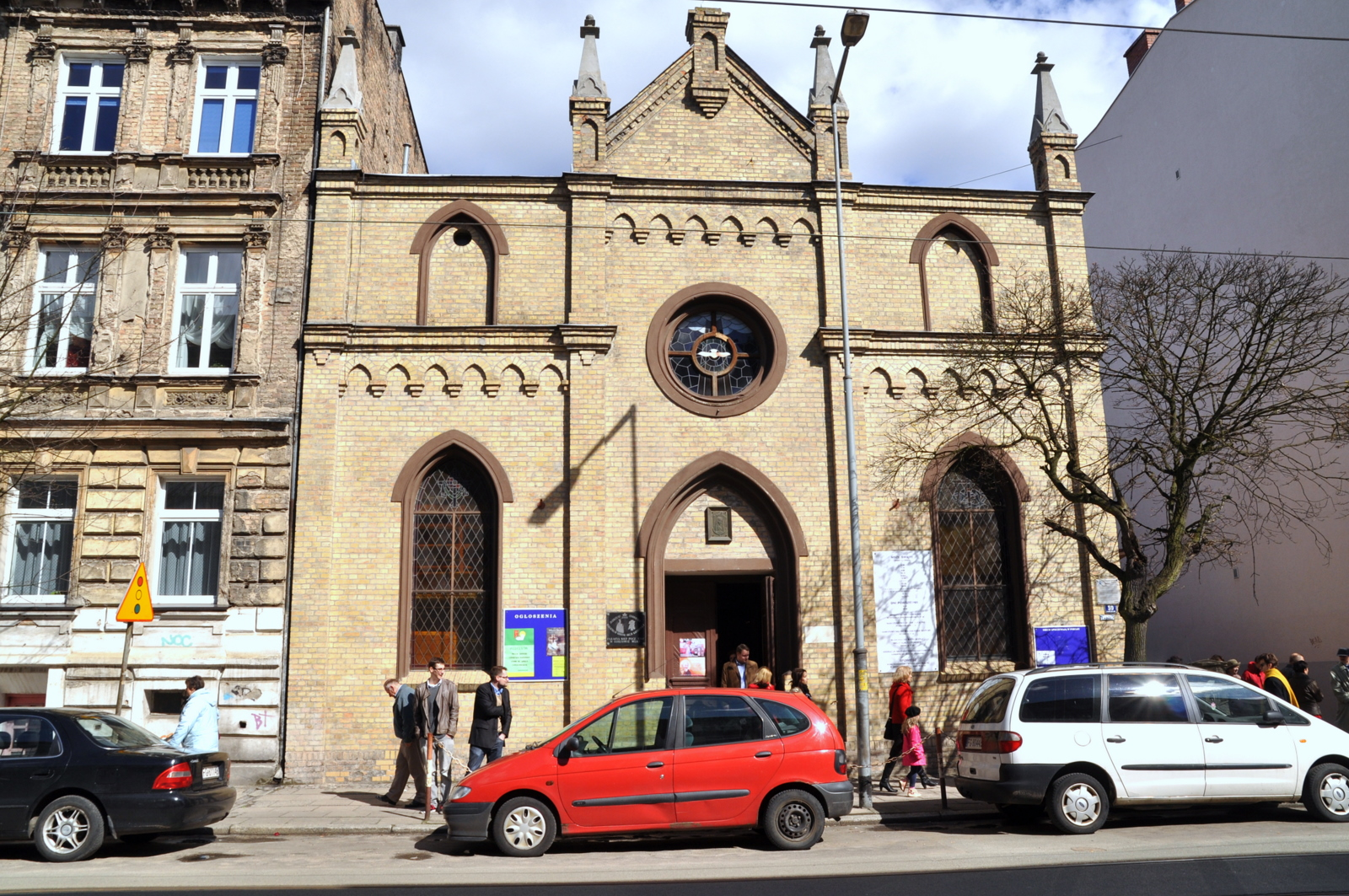
Immaculate Conception Church

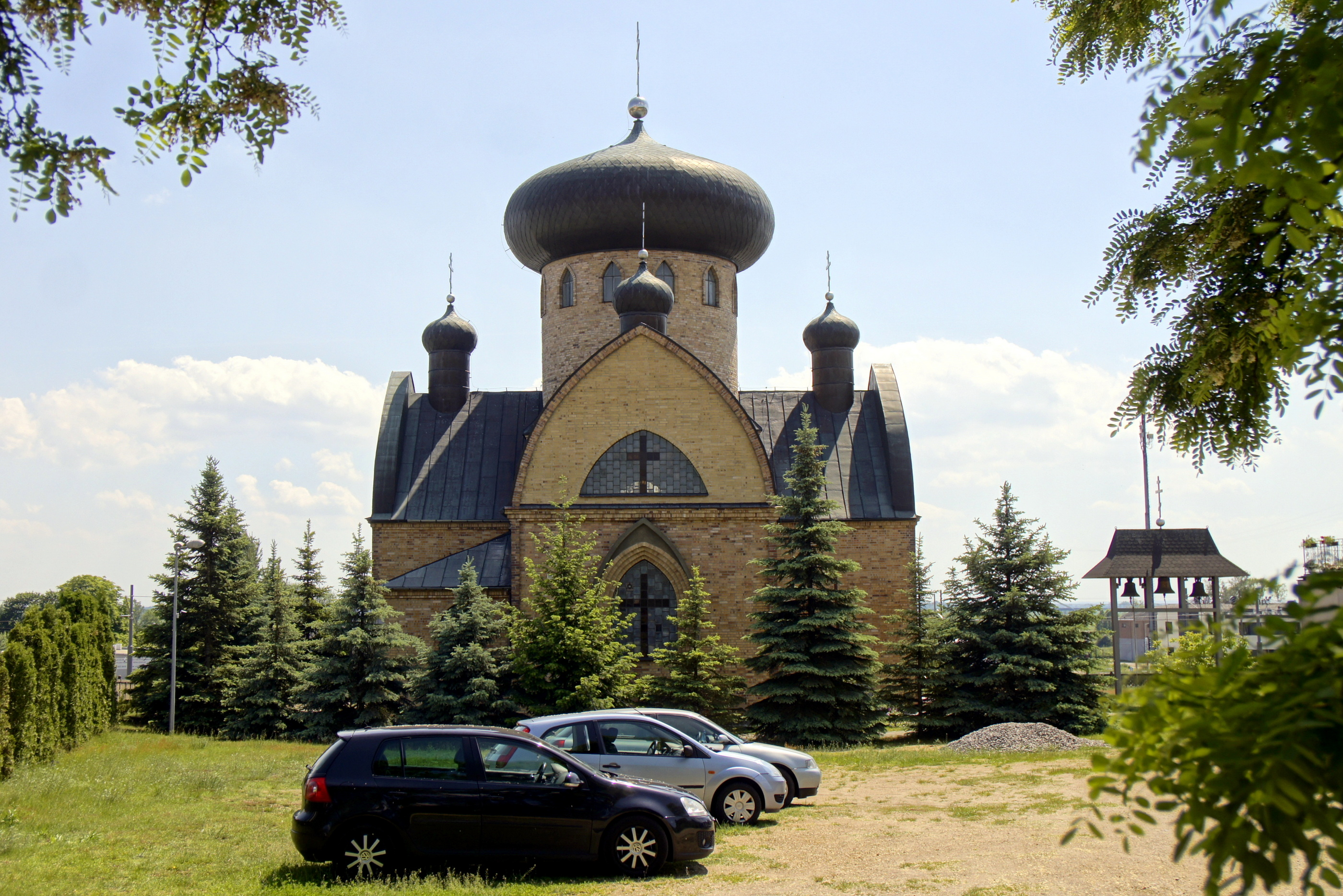
Orthodox Church of the Nativity of Blessed Virgin Mary

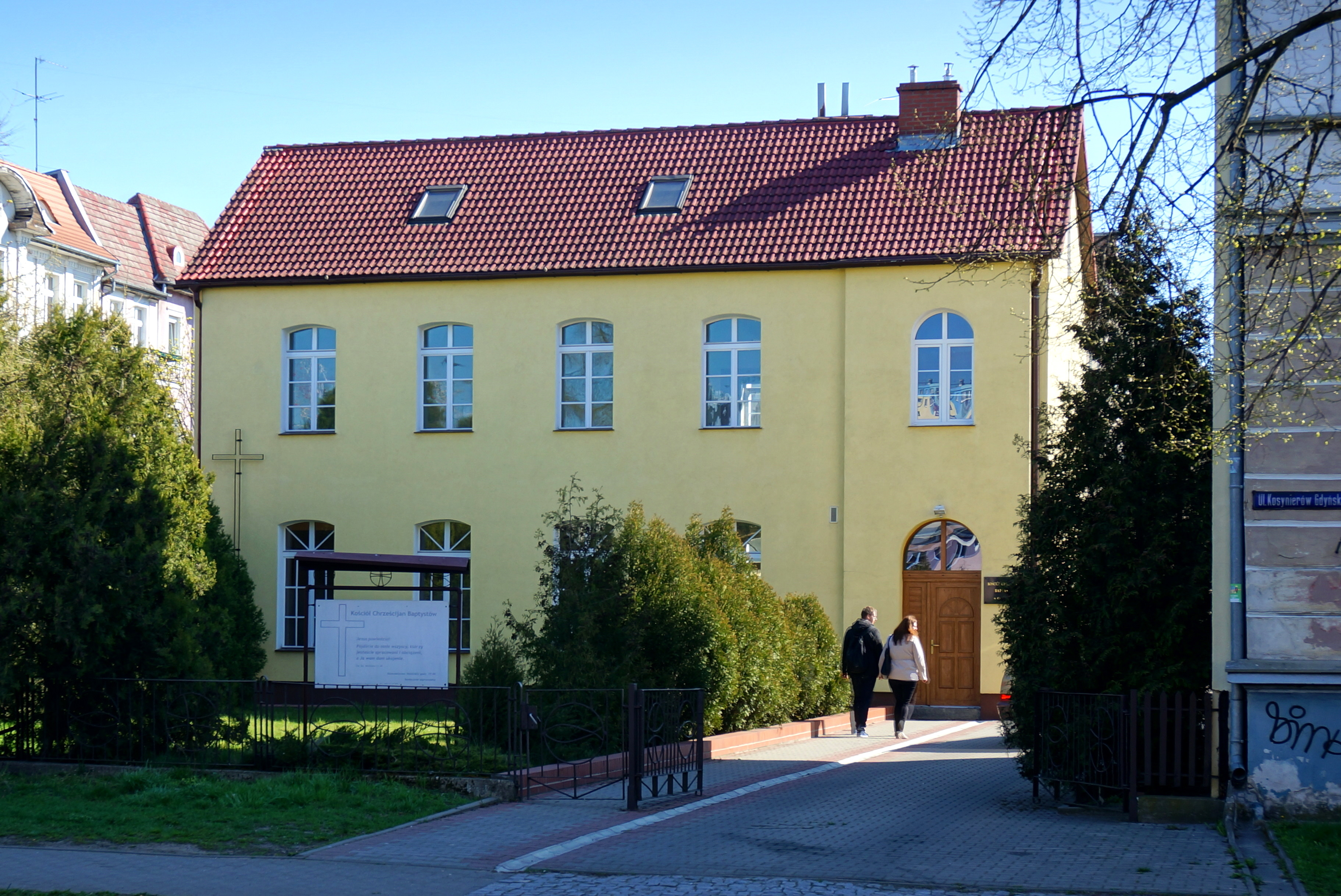
Baptist Church

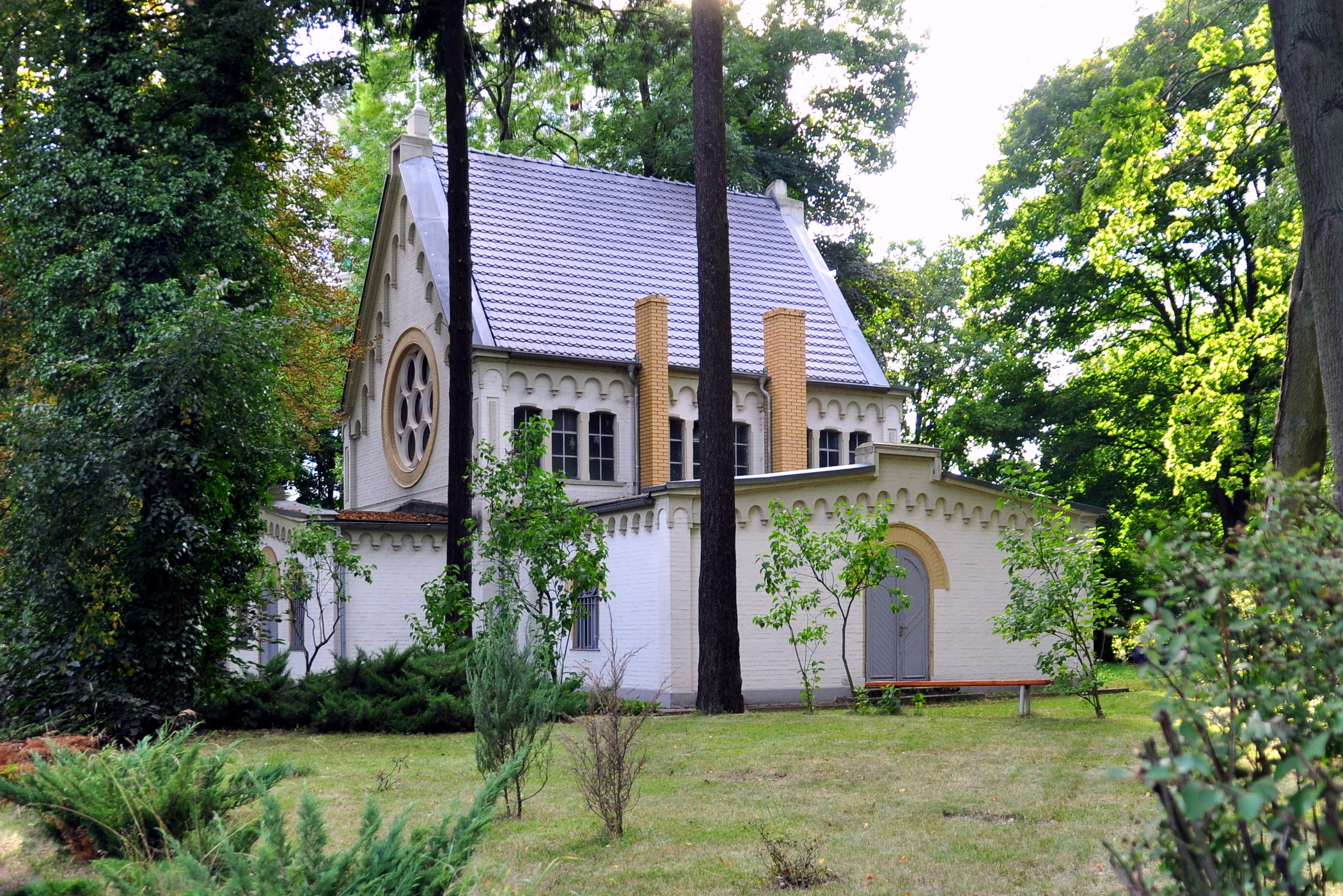
Lutheran Church of Holy Trinity

== Infrastructure ==
There are several hotels including railway station bed and breakfast.

The city offers leisure facilities. Sports and Rehabilitation Centre "Słowianka" offers a 50 m Olympic pool, aqua park facilities, saunas, gym, massage and spa. Gracja hotel offers a 25 m pool. There are a few gyms and sports hall in the city. New rowing centre at the Warta river has been completed in 2009. Speedway stadium is undergoing major extension works this year.

Gorzów embankment, which was undergoing major renovation in 2011, is a new nightlife centre. There are many restaurants and pubs around the embankment and others are coming soon.

== Education ==
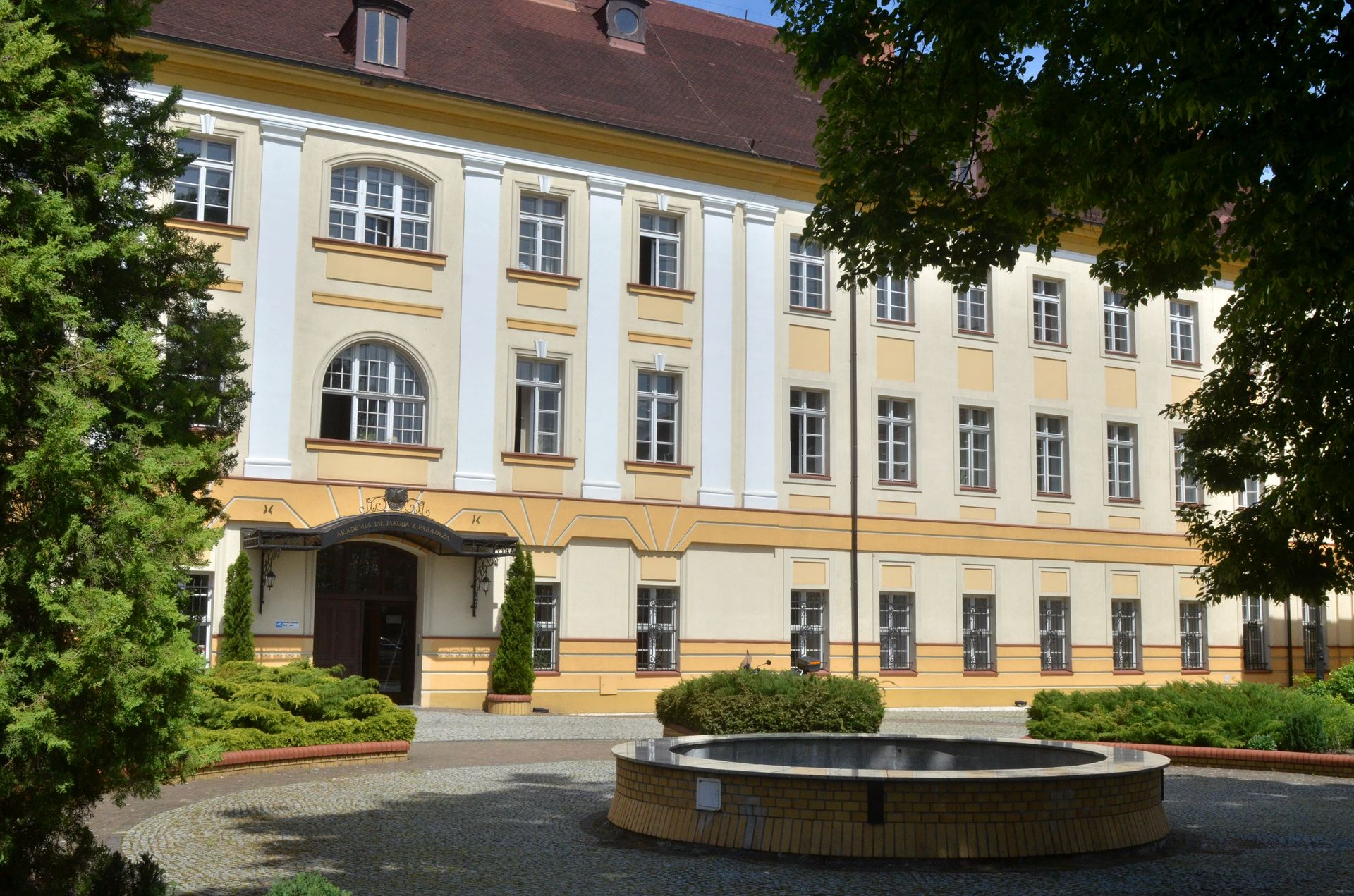
Jacob of Paradies University

- Jacob of Paradies University
- Faculty of Physical Culture in Gorzów Wielkopolski of the Eugeniusz Piasecki Academy of Physical Education in Poznań
- Higher School of Business in Gorzów Wielkopolski
- University Teaching Center in Gorzów Wielkopolski of Poznan University of Medical Sciences

== Sports ==
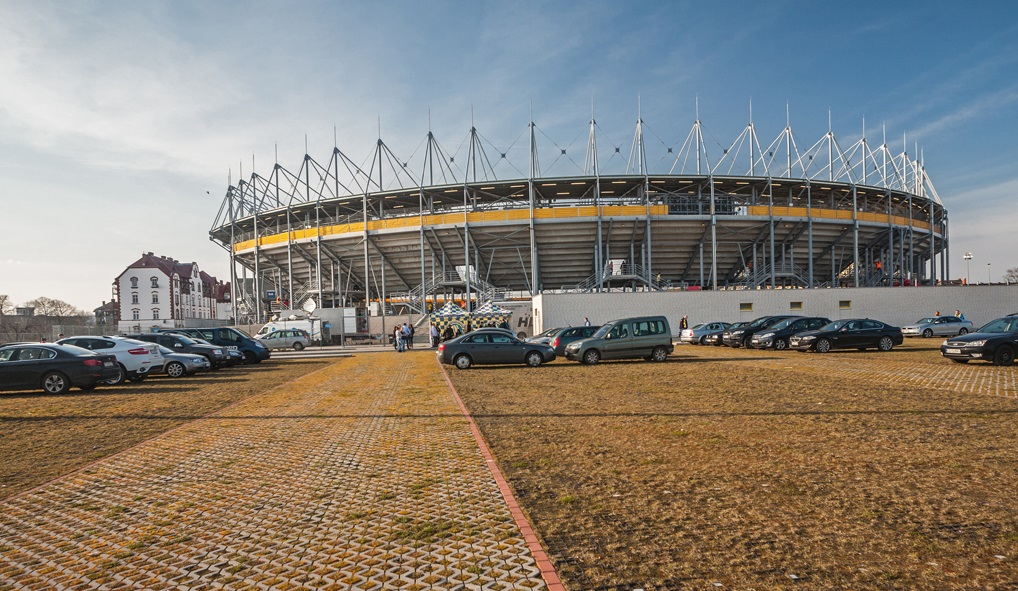
Edward Jancarz Stadium — home stadium of speedway team Stal Gorzów Wielkopolski

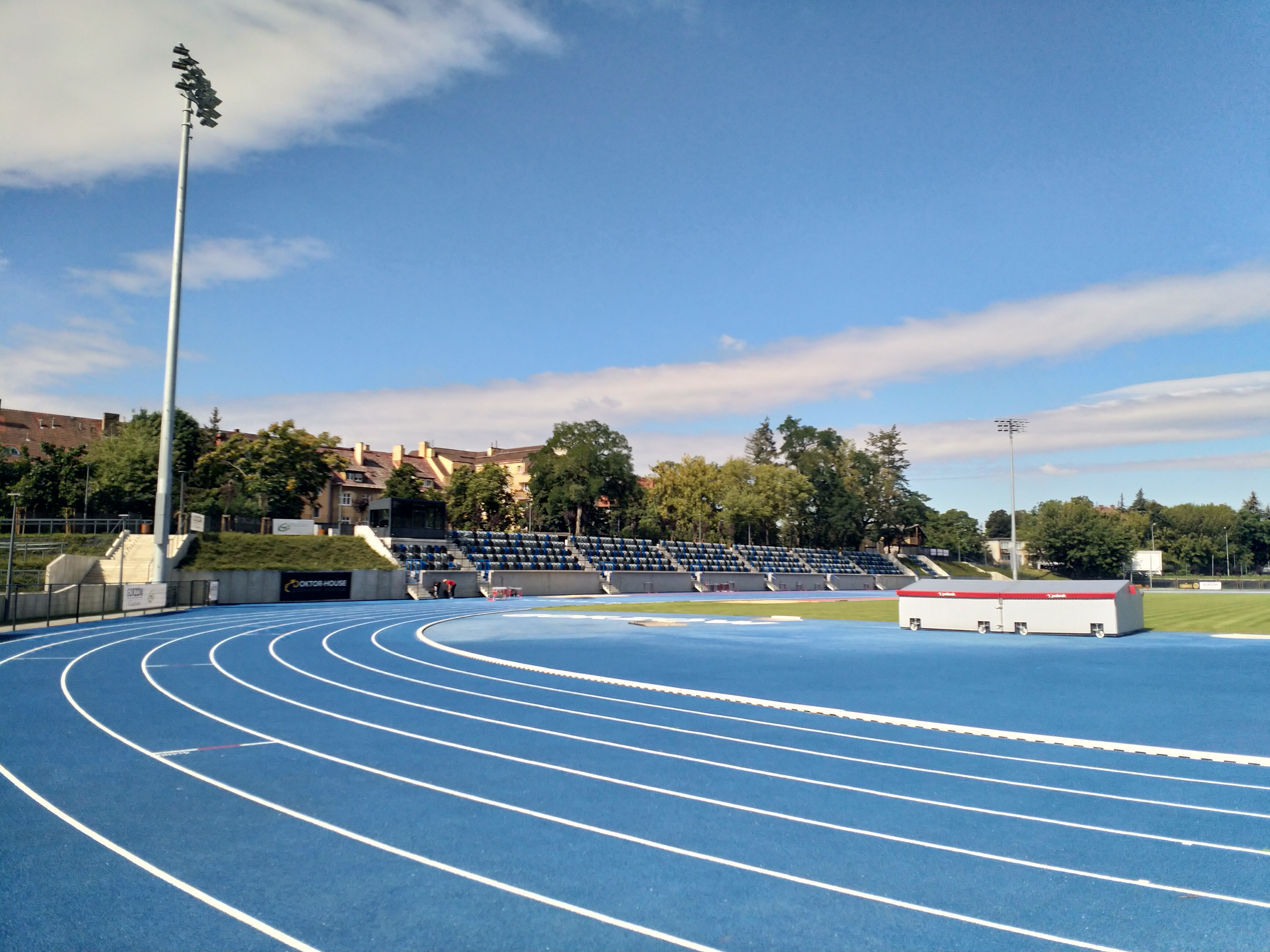
Lubusz Olympians athletics Stadium

Gorzów is known locally for its clubs and athletes. There are two Olympic champions from Gorzów: Tomasz Kucharski and Michał Jeliński, both in rowing. It has served as a home for many world champions and Olympic medalists. Volleyball has also been played there historically, with a few notable players, one of which being Sebastian Świderski, born in Gorzów Wielkopolski.

- Stal Gorzów Wielkopolski – multi-sports club with leading motorcycle speedway team, competing in the Speedway Ekstraliga (top division), nine times Polish Champions, and men handball team, competing in the Liga Centralna (second division), as of 2024
- AZS AJP Gorzów Wielkopolski – women basketball team, competing in the Basket Liga Kobiet (top division and EuroCup)
- Cuprum Stilon Gorzów – men volleyball team, competing in the PlusLiga (top division)
- Stilon Gorzów Wielkopolski – football club with men and women sections
- Warta Gorzów Wielkopolski – football club with men and women sections
- KS Iskra Gorzów Wielkopolski -

Amateur football team established in 2005. Currently playing in Polish B Class

- Gorzów Wielkopolski is a national powerhouse in water polo for decades. International events are regularly held at the Slowianka Sports Centre with a modern Olympic-size pool.

== Notable people ==
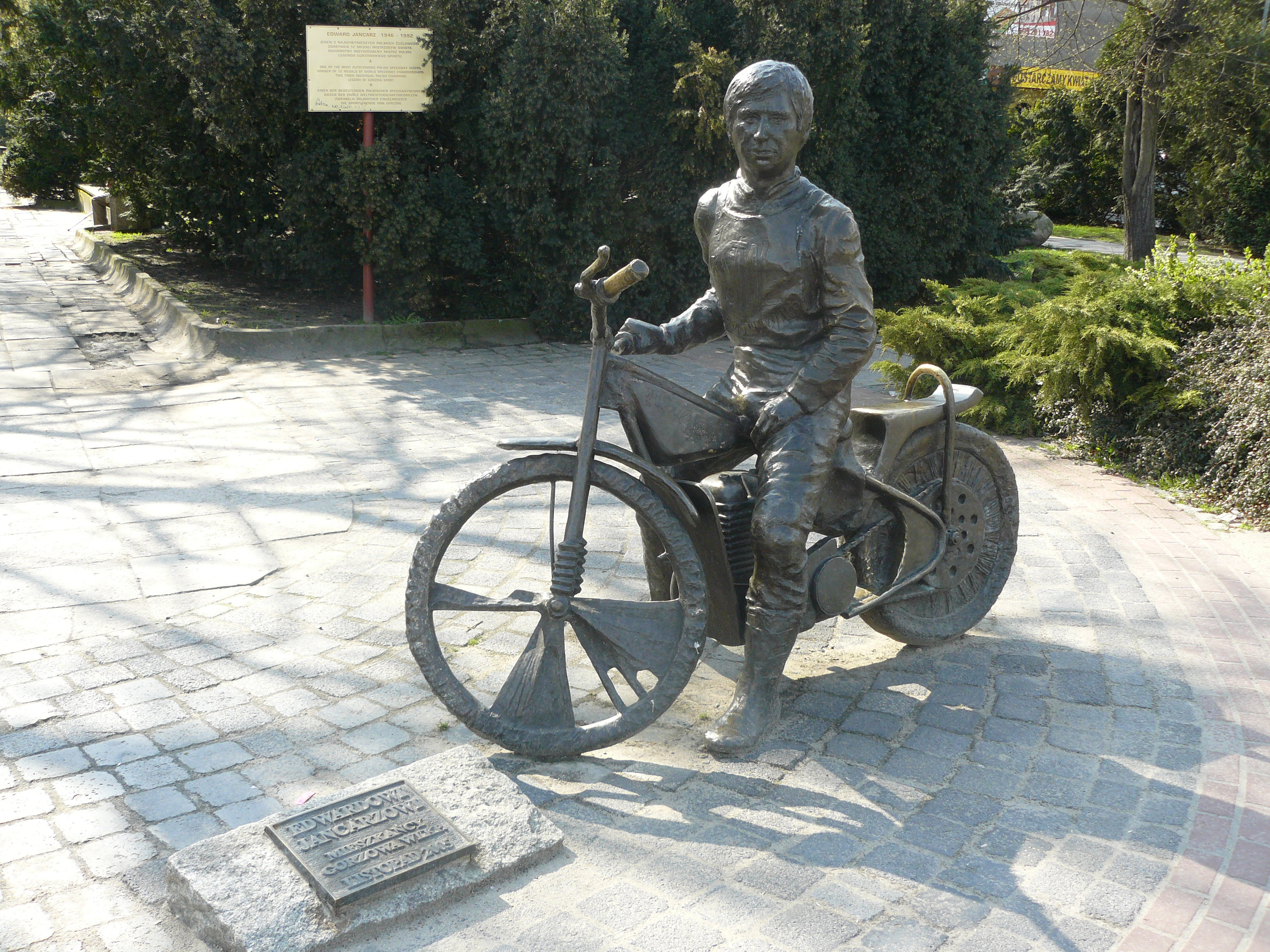
Monument of speedway rider Edward Jancarz in Gorzów

- Gottfried Bernhardy (1800–1875), German philologist and literary historian
- Hermann Paucksch (1816–1899), German mechanical engineering contractor and manufacturer
- Hermann Ende (1829–1907), German architect
- Max Fränkel (1846–1903), German classical scholar, philologist, epigrapher and librarian
- Arthur Moritz Schönflies (1853–1928), German mathematician
- Ludwig Pick (1868–1944), German pathologist
- Georg Axhausen (1877–1960), German oral and maxillofacial surgeon
- Marie Juchacz (1879–1956), German SPD politician
- Victor Klemperer (1881–1960), German author and literary scholar
- Ernst Schwarz (1886–1958), German politician
- Elisabeth Röhl (1888–1930), German politician
- Kurt Scharf (1902–1990), German Lutheran bishop of Berlin
- Bronisława Wajs (1908–1987), Romani poet
- Herman Bottcher (1909–1944), German-American soldier
- Roger G. Newton (1924–2018), German-American physicist
- Christa Wolf (1929–2011), German writer and literary critic
- Teresa Klimek (1929–2013), math teacher, co-founder of the local branch of the Catholic Intellectuals Club and executive on the regional branch of Solidarity
- Wolfgang Müller (1931–2021), German equestrian
- Edward Dębicki (born 1935), Romani poet, composer and musician
- Edward Jancarz (1946–1992), speedway rider
- Danuta Danielsson (1947–1988), Polish anti-Nazi protester, subject of an iconinc photograph taken in 1985 in Växjö, Sweden
- Zenon Plech (1953-2020), speedway rider
- Kazimierz Marcinkiewicz (born 1959), former Prime Minister of Poland
- Marek Jurek (born 1960), politician, former Marshal of the Sejm of the Republic of Poland
- Lech Piasecki (born 1961), racing cyclist
- Zenon Jaskuła (born 1962), racing cyclist
- Tomasz Kucharski (born 1974), rower, double Olympic champion
- Beata Sokołowska-Kulesza (born 1974), sprint canoer, Olympic bronze medalist and world champion
- Sebastian Świderski (born 1977), volleyball player
- Michał Jeliński (born 1980), Olympic and four times world champion in rowing
- Michal (Michał Kwiatkowski, born 1983), singer, Star Academy music contest runner-up
- Łukasz Maliszewski (born 1985), footballer
- Kamil Dragun (born 1995), chess grandmaster
- Dawid Kwiatkowski (born 1996), singer-songwriter
- Dawid Kownacki (born 1997), Polish professional football player
- Sebastian Walukiewicz (born 2000), Polish professional football player

== Twin towns – sister cities ==
Gorzów Wielkopolski is twinned with:

- Cava de' Tirreni, Italy
- Eberswalde, Germany
- Frankfurt an der Oder, Germany
- Herford (district), Germany
- Jönköping, Sweden
- Sumy, Ukraine
- Teramo, Italy

== Gallery ==
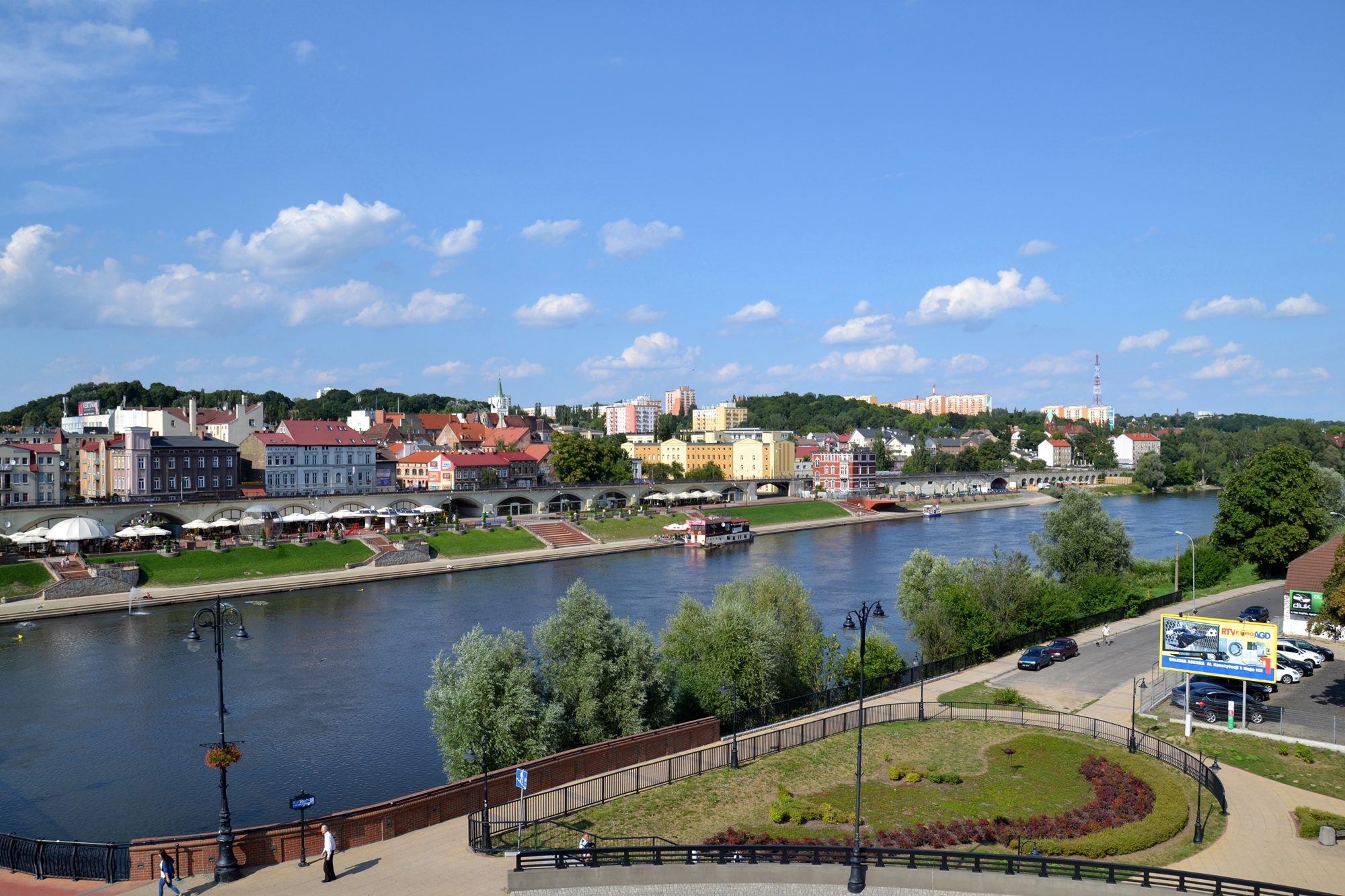
View of the riverside boulevards and the city's oldest section

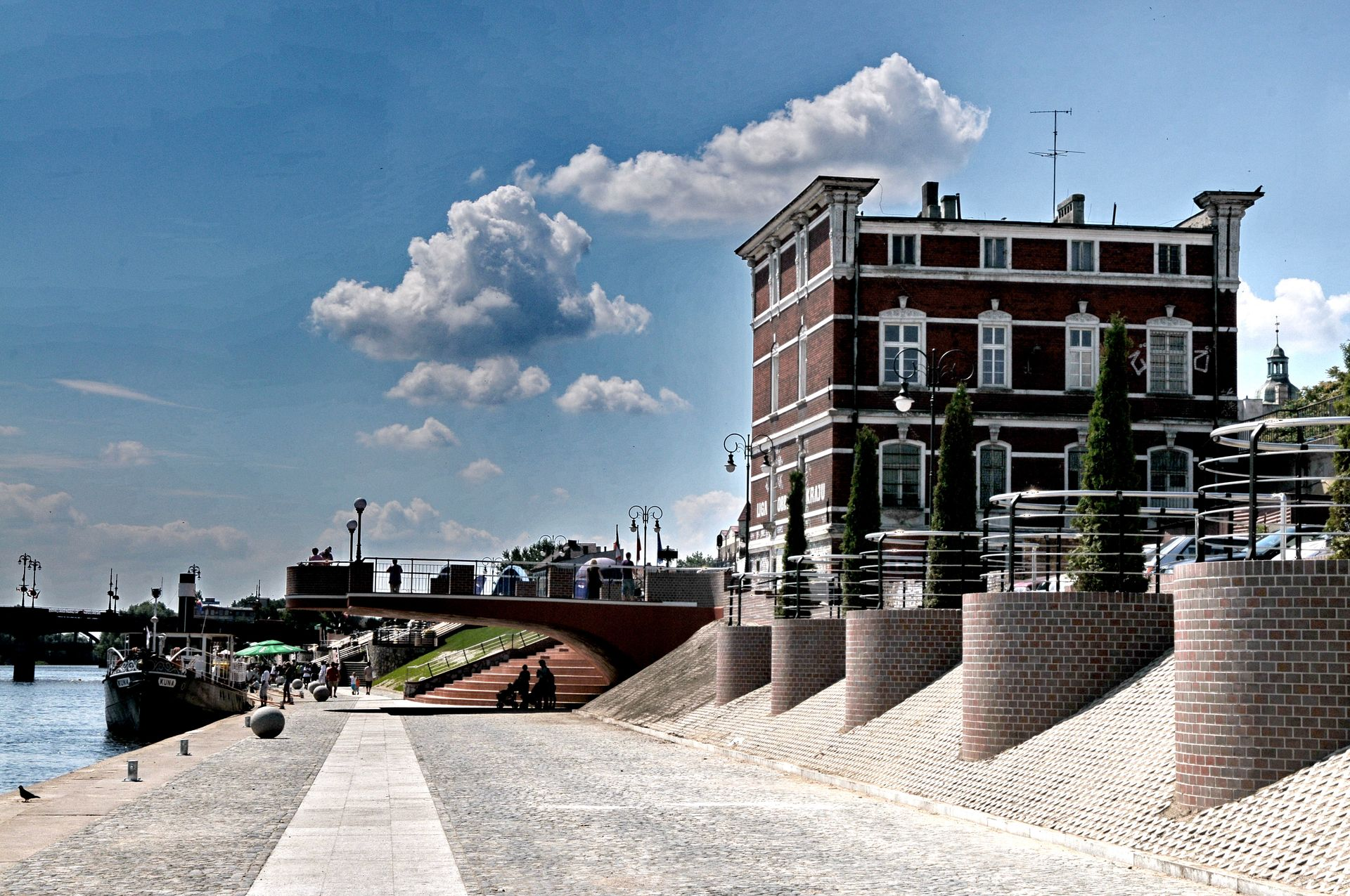
Nadwarcianski Boulevard

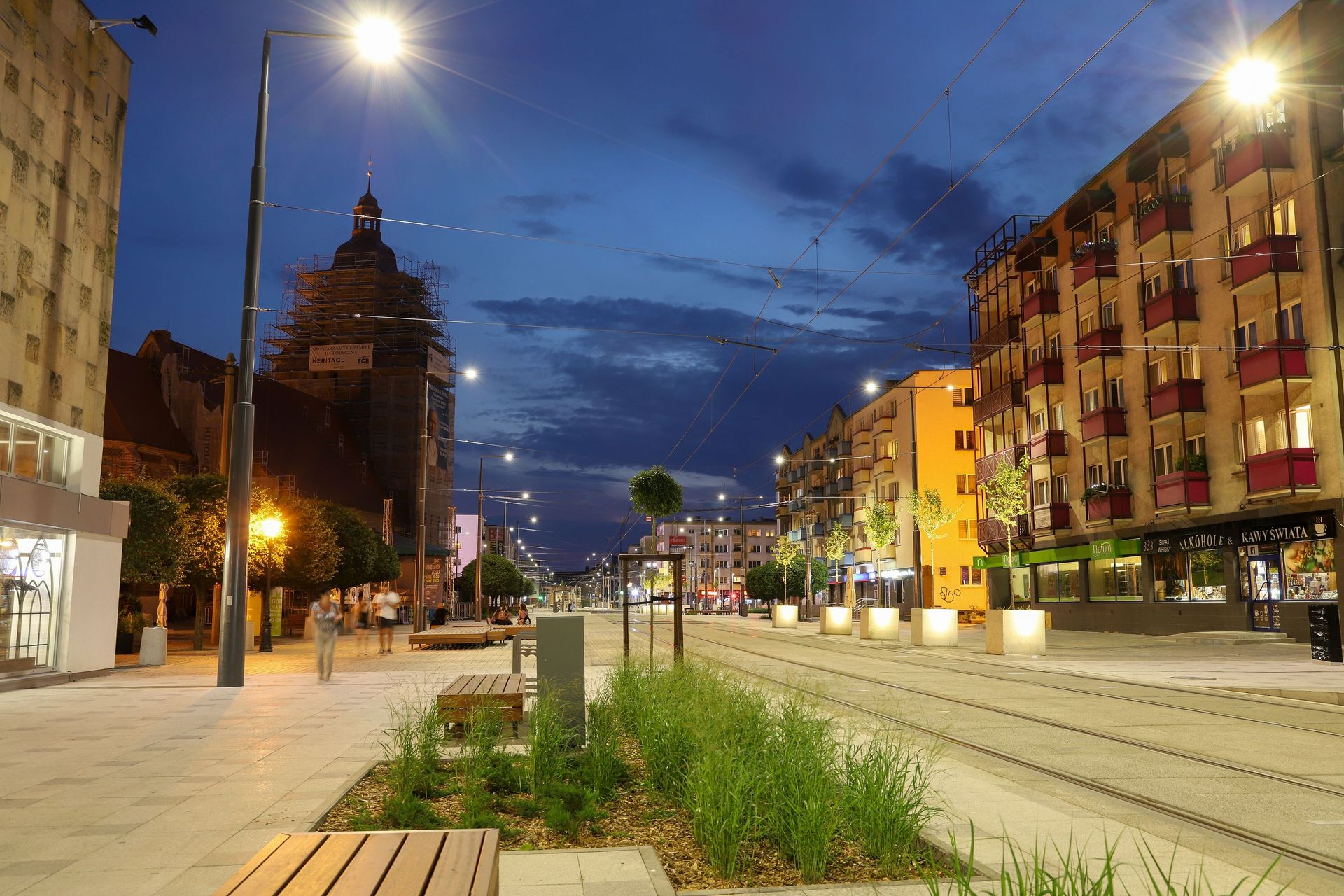
Pedestrian zone on Sikorski Street

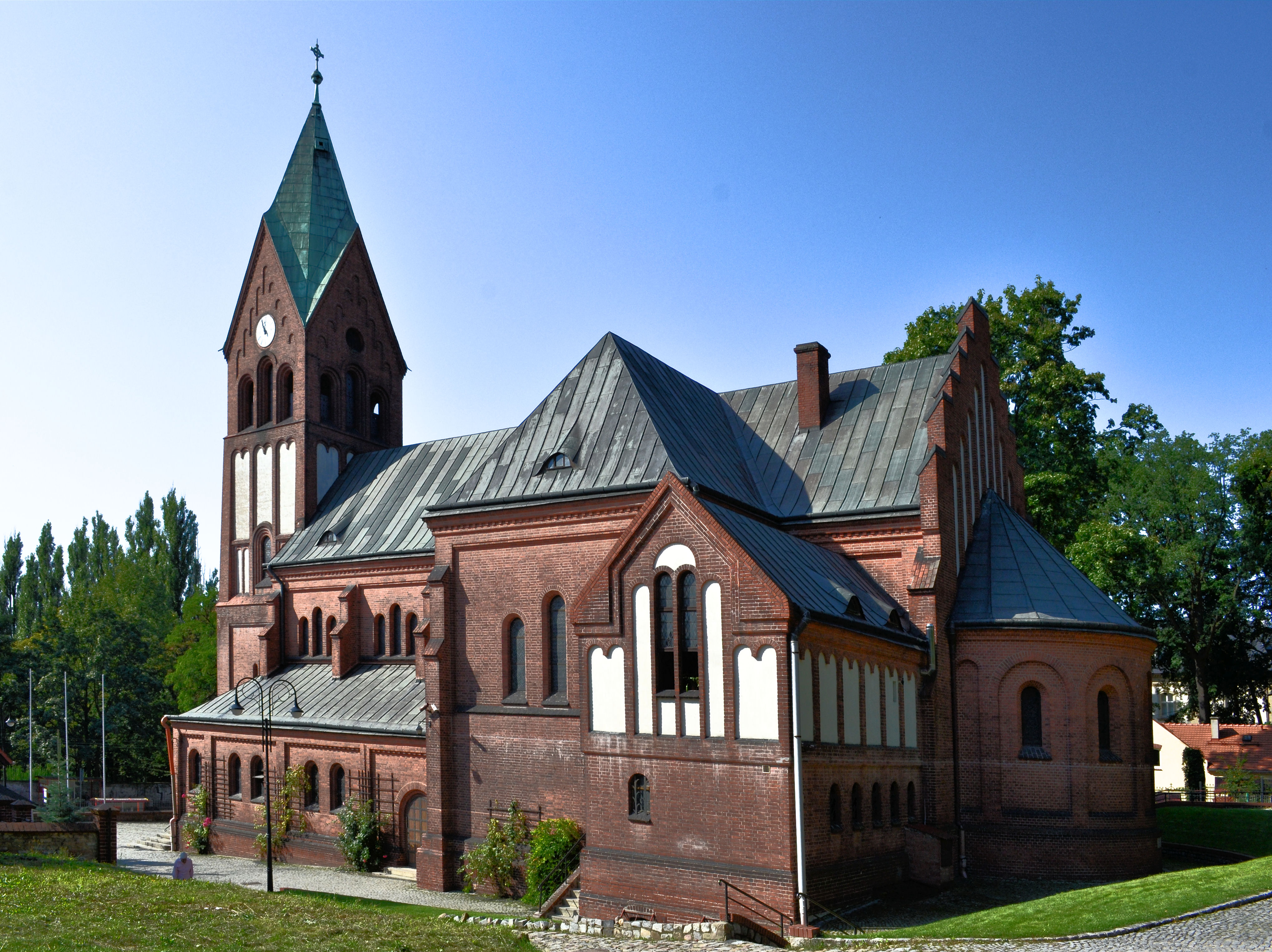
Holy Cross Church

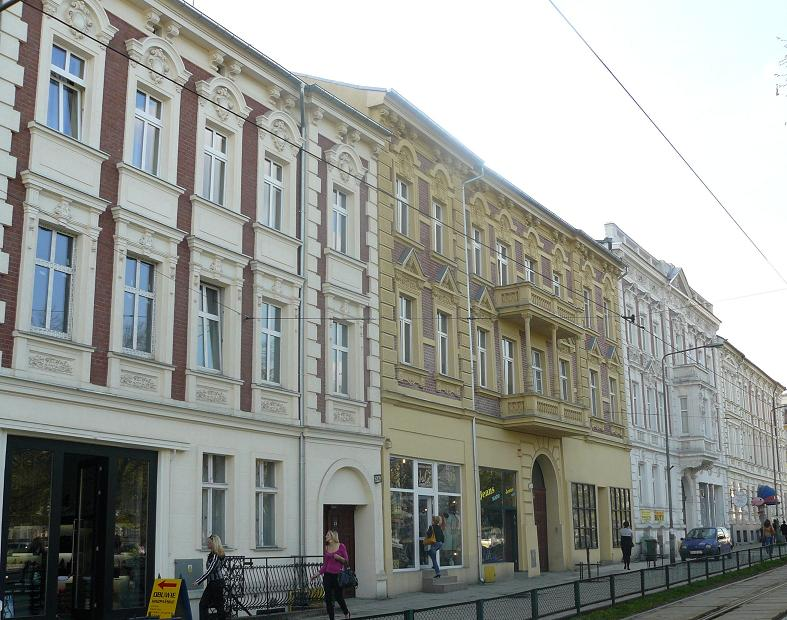
Chrobrego Street

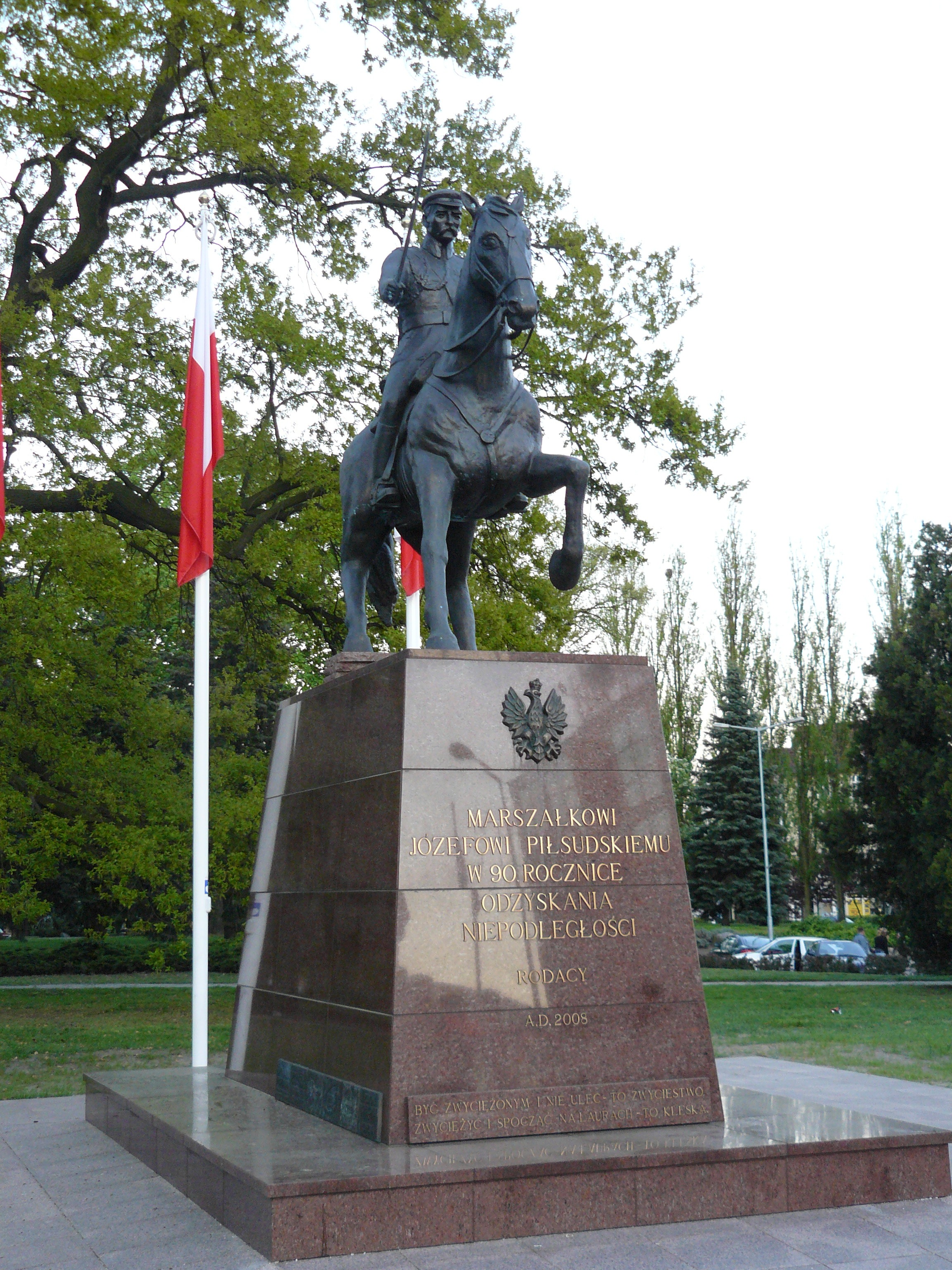
Józef Piłsudski Monument

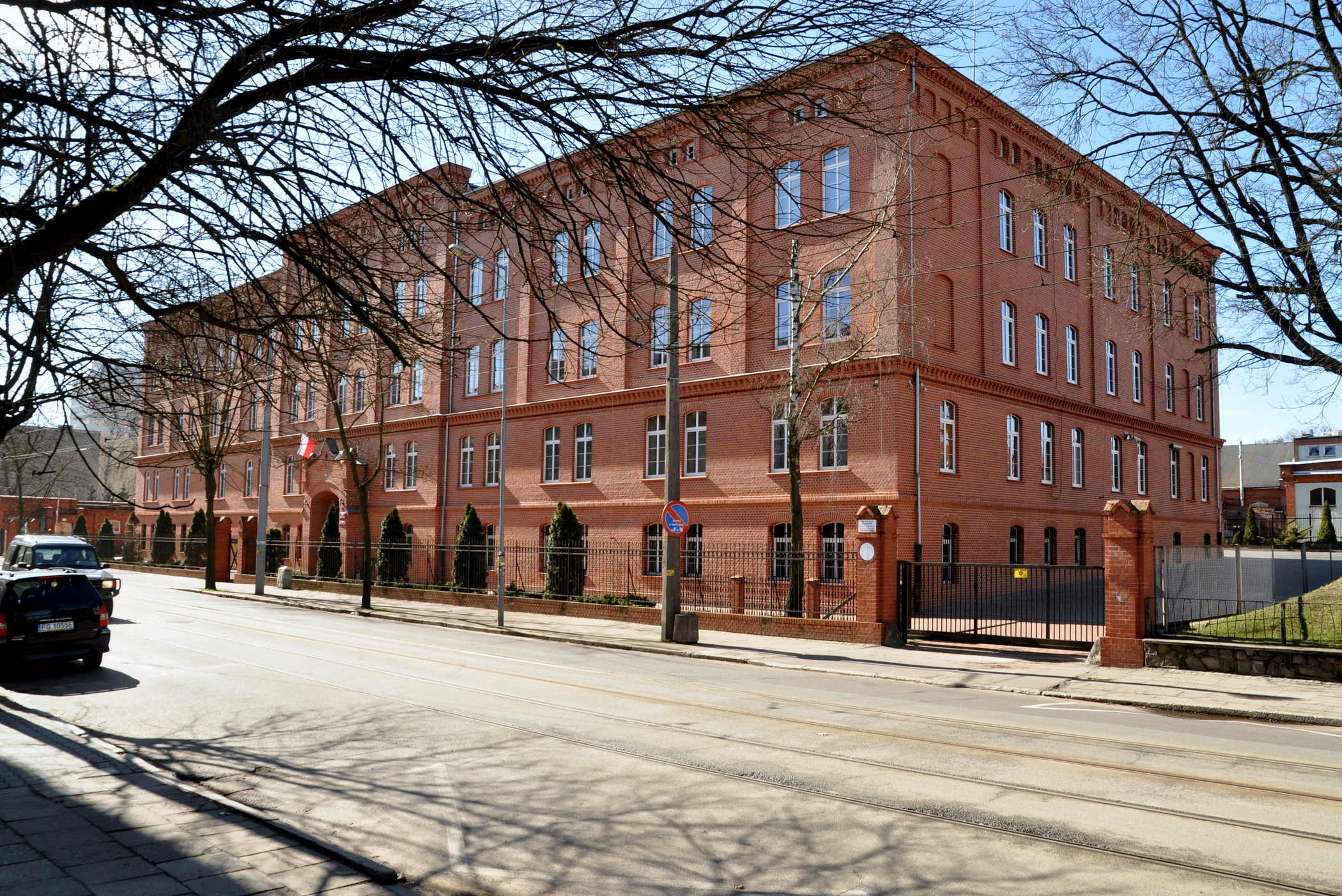
District Court

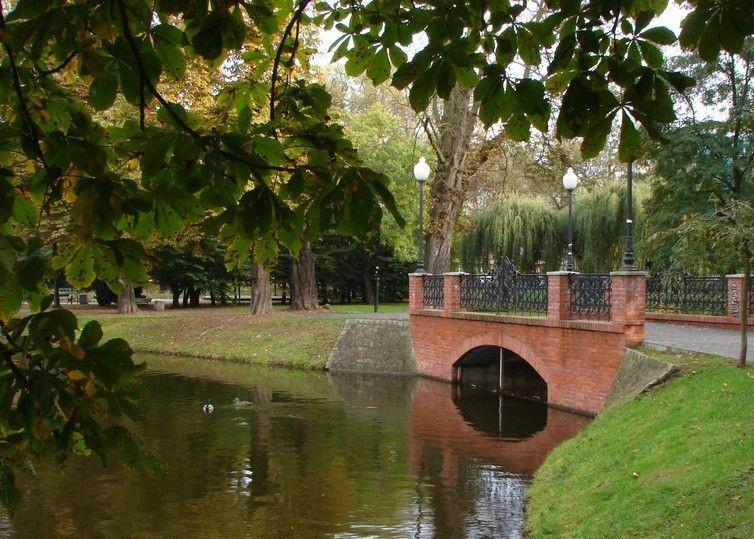
Spring of Nations Park

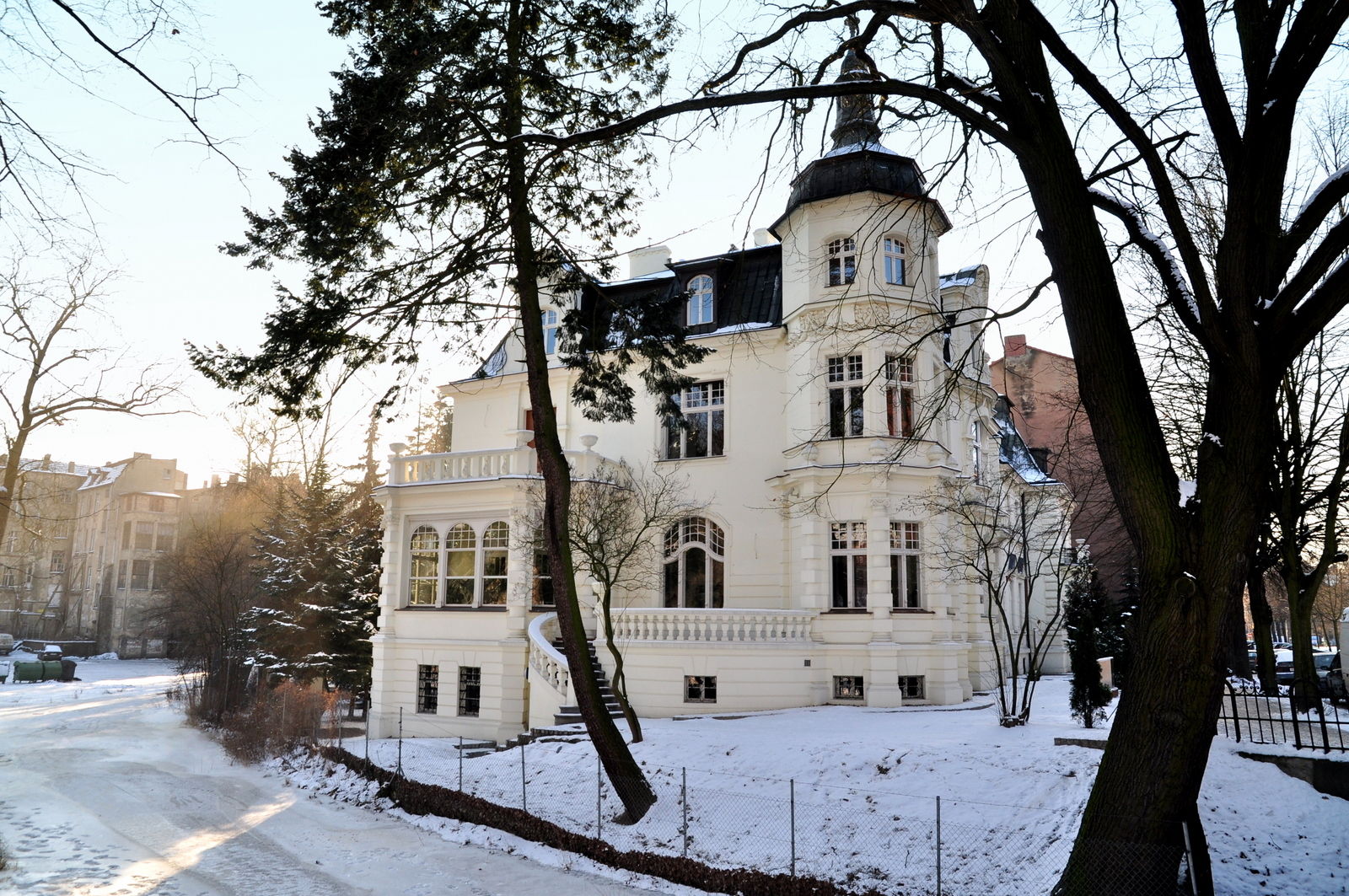
Bishop's Palace

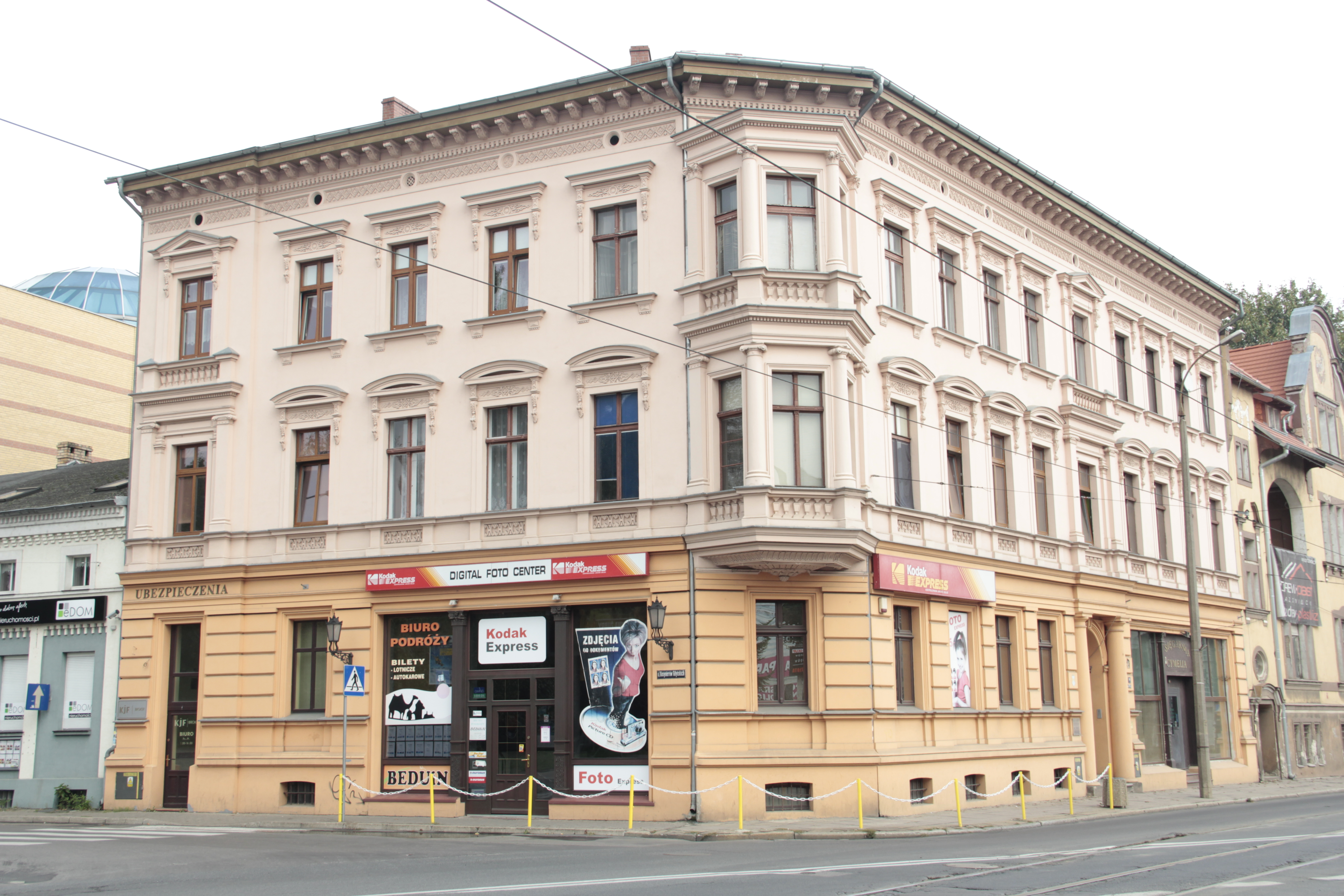
An example of a 19th-century townhouse

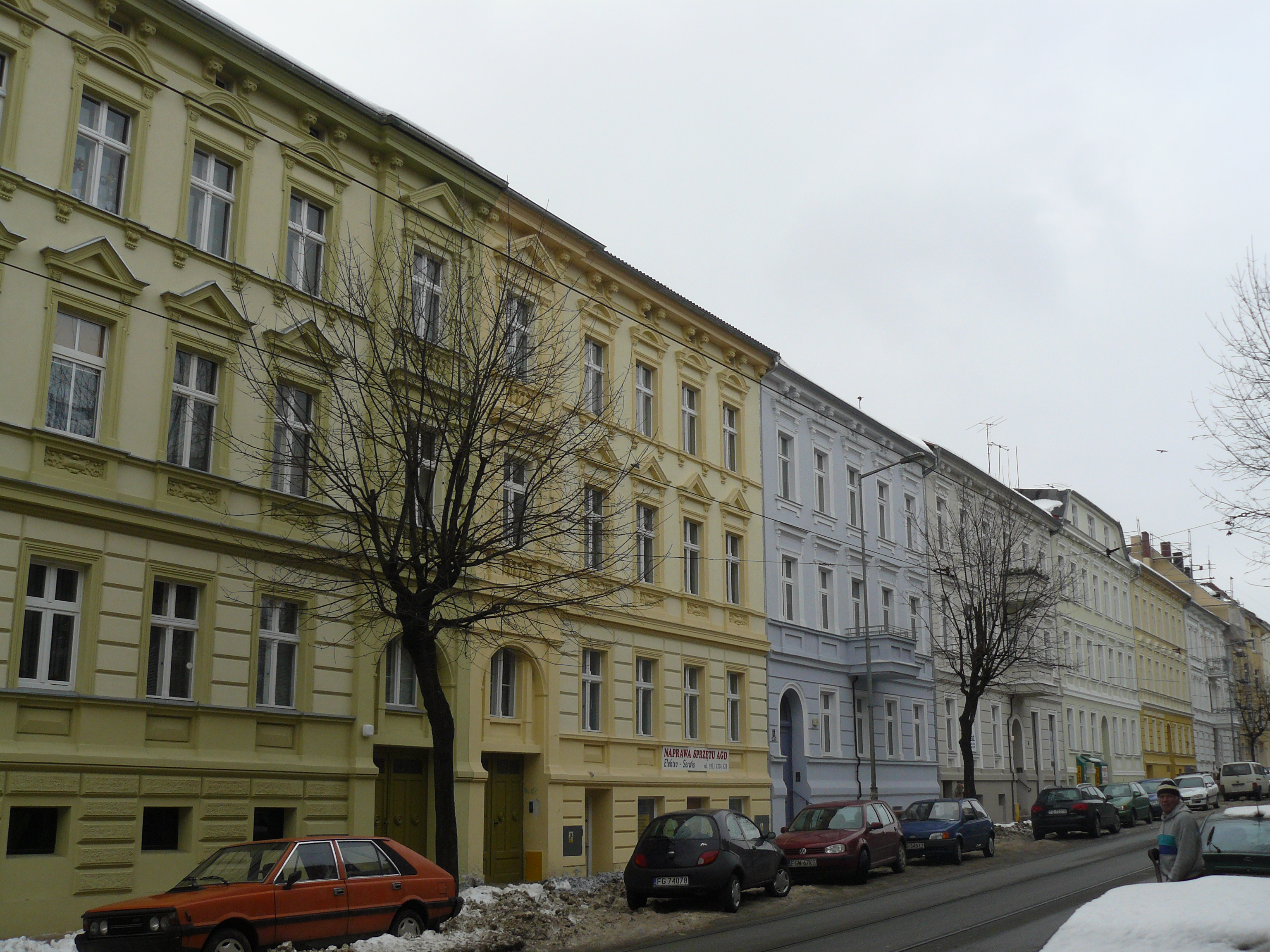
Old townhouses, Mieszka I Street

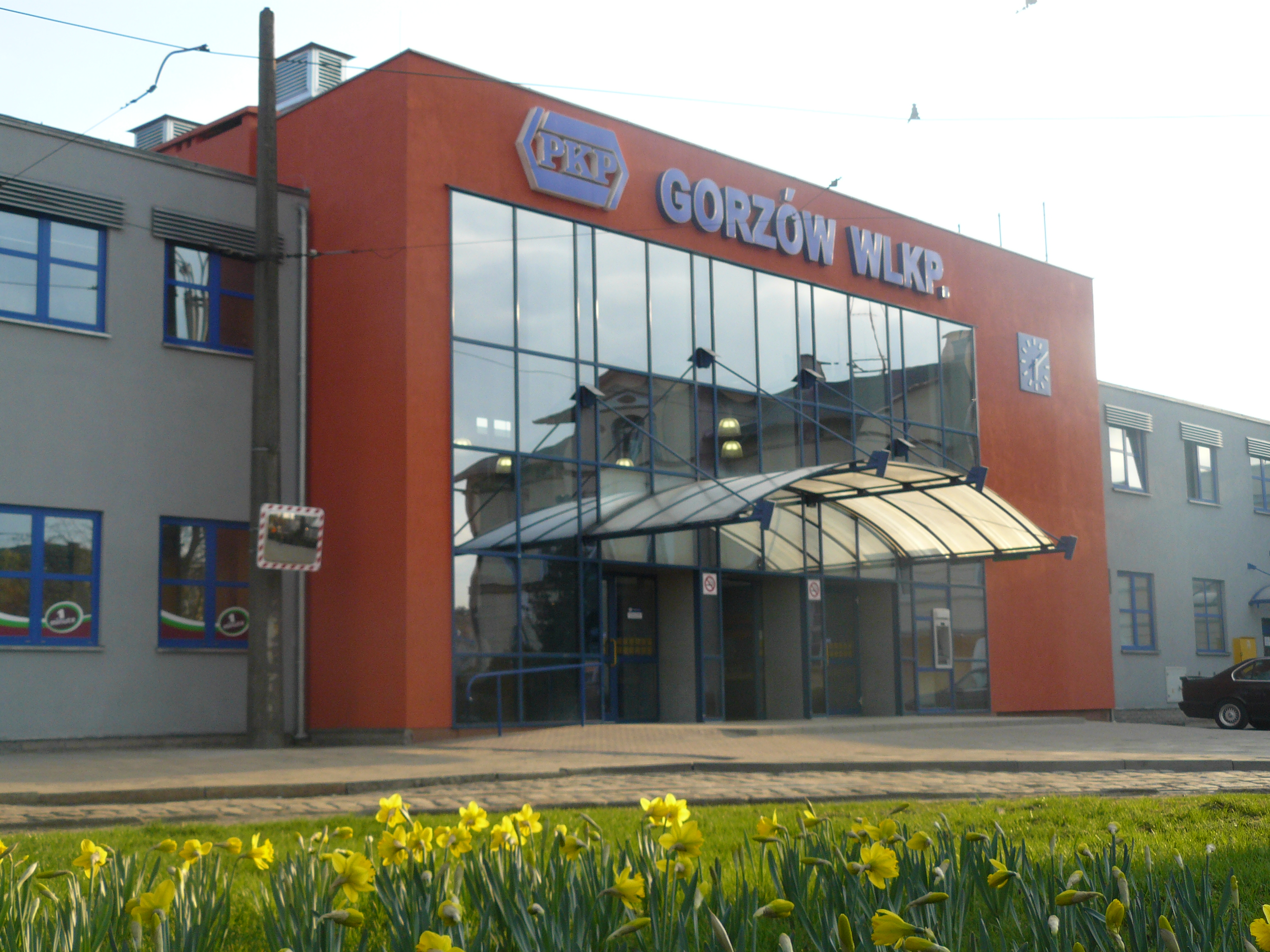
Main railway station

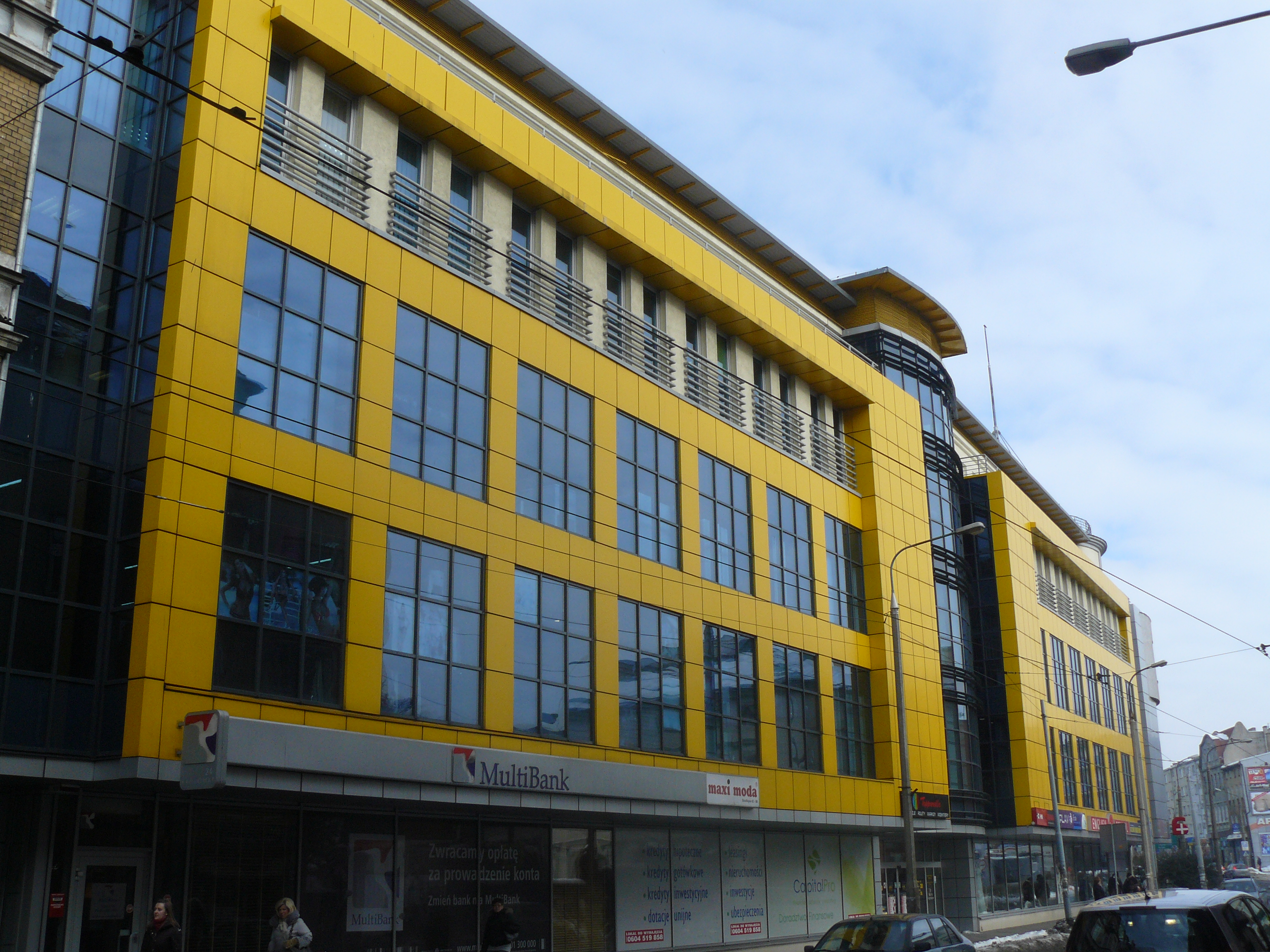
Park 111 shopping centre
