= Romani diaspora =

Dispersion of the Romani people

Countries with a significant Romani population according to unofficial estimates. + 1,000,000 + 100,000 + 10,000

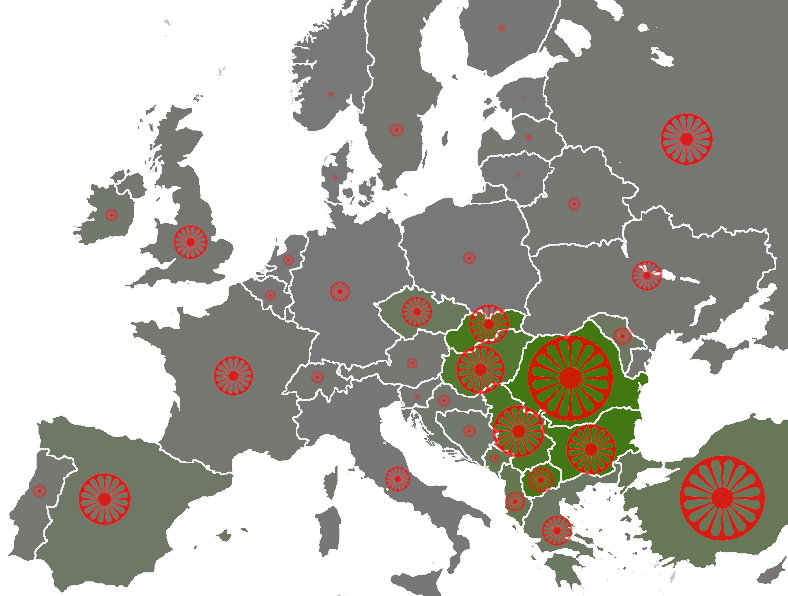
Distribution of the Romani people in Europe (2007 Council of Europe "average estimates", totalling 9.8 million) * The size of the wheel symbols reflects absolute population size * The gradient reflects the percent in the country's population: 0% 10%.

The Romani diaspora refers to the presence and dispersion of Romani people across various parts of the world. Their migration out of the Indian subcontinent occurred in waves, with the first estimated to have taken place in the 6th century. They are believed to have first arrived in Europe in the 9th century, via the Balkans. Gradually, they came to settle across the areas of present-day European Turkey, Greece, Bulgaria, Romania, North Macedonia, Serbia, Kosovo, Moldova, Hungary, Albania, Montenegro, Bosnia and Herzegovina, Croatia, Slovenia and Slovakia. From the Balkans, they migrated throughout Europe and, in the 19th and later centuries, some migrated to the Americas. The Romani population in the United States is estimated at around one million.

Romani people are predominantly found in Europe, particularly in the Balkans, Slovakia and Spain. The total number of Romani people living outside Europe are primarily in the Americas, and are estimated in total at more than two million. Most Romani populations overseas were founded in the 19th century by emigration from Europe. Some countries do not collect data by ethnicity. As of the early 2000s, an estimated 4 to 9 million Romani people lived in Europe and Asia Minor, although some Romani organizations estimate numbers as high as 14 million. There is no official or reliable count of the Roma populations worldwide. Many Roma refuse to register their ethnic identity in official censuses for fear of discrimination. There are also some descendants of intermarriage with local populations who no longer identify exclusively as Romani, or who do not identify as Romani at all.

The term Xoraxane refers to Turkified/Muslim Romani. whereas the term Dasikane is a lesser-used term referring to Christian Romani. Additionally, Romani people may identify with distinct subgroups based in part on territorial, religious, cultural and dialectal differences, and self-designation. The main branches are:

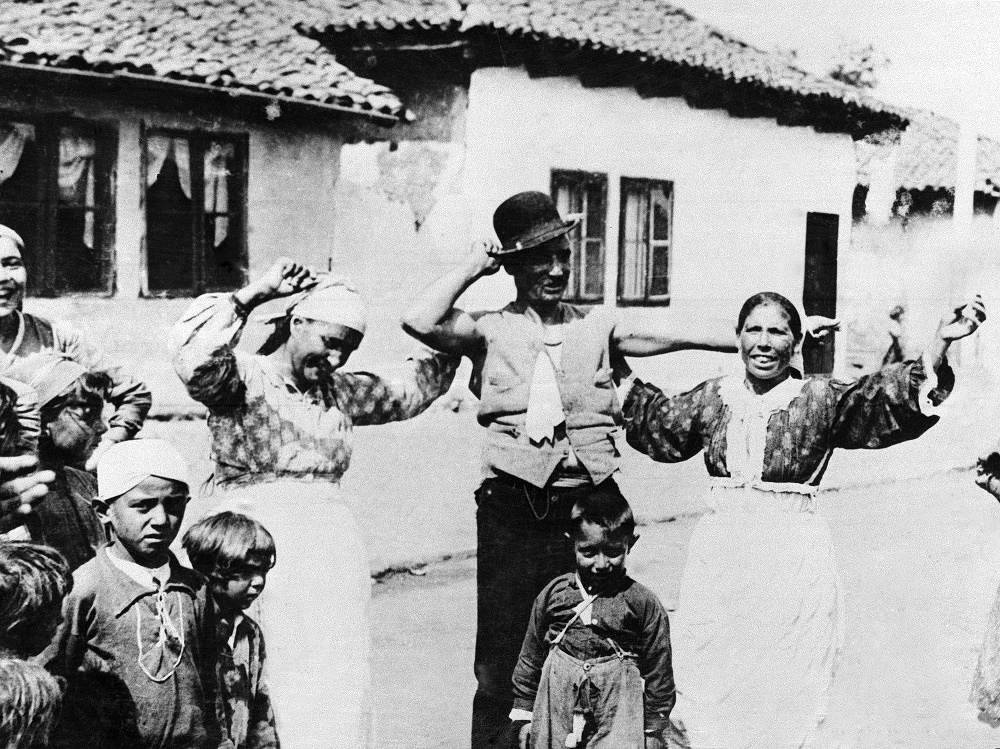
Romani people dancing at a Romani wedding in Sofia, Bulgaria, 1936

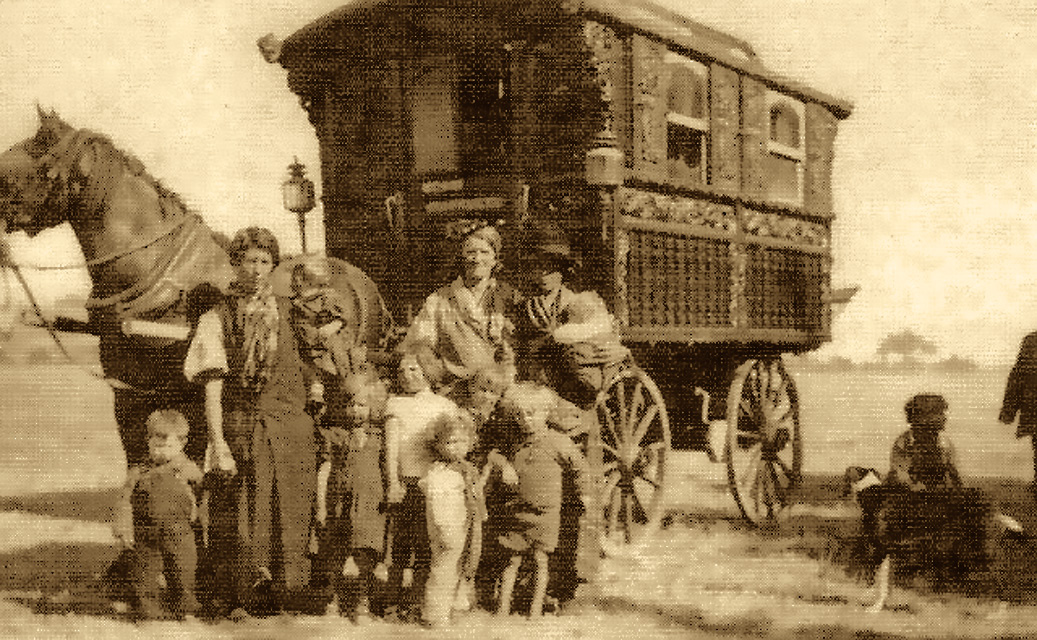
Romani people with their horse and vardo (Romani wagon) in Epsom, England, 1938

1. Roma or Romanies—in this context, these terms encompass Romani people who do not identify with a subgroup, present throughout the continent. They are also used to refer to all Romani people as a whole.
2. Sinti, concentrated in Germany, Austria, Switzerland, France and Italy.
3. Kalderash, concentrated in Romania, Bulgaria, Serbia and Hungary.
4. Calé, concentrated in Spain, but also in Portugal (see Romani people in Portugal) and southern France.
5. Manouche, concentrated in France and Belgium.
6. Romanlar, in Turkey, particularly East Thrace.
7. Romanichal, in England, the Scottish Borders, northeast Wales and south Wales.
8. Romanisael, in Sweden and Norway.
9. Gurbeti, concentrated in Turkey, Albania, Bulgaria, Kosovo and Serbia
10. Boyash, concentrated in Romania and Moldova.
11. Ursari, concentrated in Romania and Moldova.
12. Kaale, in Finland and Sweden.
13. Kalé, in Wales.
14. Lovari, concentrated in Hungary, Slovakia and the Czech Republic.
15. Sevlengere in Greece and Turkey.
16. Lowland Romani, in the Scottish Lowlands.

Romani people have additional internal distinctions, with groups identified as; Xaladytka (Ruska Roma); Bashaldé; Churari; Ungaritza; Machvaya (Machavaya, Machwaya, or Macwaia) in Serbia; Romungro in Hungary and neighbouring Carpathian countries; Erlides (Yerlii, Arli); Argintari from silversmiths; Aurari from goldsmiths; Florari from florists; and Lăutari from singers.

== Population by country ==
This is a table of Romani people by country.

The official number of Romani people is disputed in many countries; some do not collect data by ethnicity; in others, Romani individuals may refuse to register their ethnic identity for fear of discrimination, or have assimilated and do not identify exclusively as Romani. In some cases, governments consult Romani organizations for data.

| Country | Region | Population | Subgroups |
|---|---|---|---|
| Albania | Southeastern Europe | 8,301 (0.3%) (official 2011 census) | Gabel (Vlax Roma), |
| Algeria | North Africa | 40,000 | Kale, Xoraxane |
| Angola | Africa | 16,000 | Kale (from Portugal) |
| Argentina | South America | 300,000 | Kalderash, Boyash, Kale |
| Australia | Oceania | 5,000+ | Romanichal, Boyash |
| Austria | Central Europe | 20,000–50,000 | Burgenland-Roma, Sinti, Lovari, Arlije from Macedonia, Kalderash from Serbia, Gurbeti from Serbia and Macedonia |
| Belarus | Eastern Europe | 10,000 (census data) or 50,000–60,000 (estimated data) | Belaruska Roma, Ruska Roma, Polska Roma, Litovska Roma, Lotfitka Roma, Servy, Kalderash |
| Belgium | Western Europe | 10,000–15,000 | Romungro |
| Bosnia and Herzegovina | Southeastern Europe | 12,000 / 58,000 | |
| Brazil | South America | 678,000–1,000,000 | Kale, Kalderash, Machvaya, Xoraxane, Boyash |
| Bulgaria | Southeastern Europe | 370,908 (official census) to 600,000 | Yerli, Gurbeti, Kalderash, Boyash, Ursari, Turkish Roma |
| Canada | North America | 80,000 | Kalderash, Romanichal |
| Chile | South America | 15,000–20,000 | Xoraxane |
| Colombia | South America | 4,850 | Kalderash |
| Croatia | Central / Southeastern Europe | 2,500 (census results); Estimated:3,000 | Lovari, Boyash |
| Cyprus | West Asia | 1,250 (estimated) | Kalderash, Kurbet, Mantides |
| Denmark | Northern Europe | 1,500–2,000 | |
| Ecuador | South America | 2,000 | Kalderash |
| Estonia | Northern Europe | 456 | Baltic |
| Finland | Northern Europe | 10,000+ | Kàlo |
| France | Western Europe | 500,000 (official estimation); 1,200,000–1,300,000 (unofficial estimation) | Manush, Kalderash, Lovari, Sinti |
| Germany | Central / Western Europe | 500,000 | mostly Sinti, but also Balkan Roma, Vlax Roma |
| Georgia | West Asia / Eastern Europe | 500+ | |
| Greece | Southeastern Europe | 200,000 or 300,000 | Erlides, Xoraxane, |
| Hungary | Central / Southeastern Europe | 205,984 (census); 394,000–1,000,000 (estimated) | Romungro, Boyash, Lovari |
| Ireland | Northern Europe | 3,000 | |
| Italy | Southern Europe | 90,000–180,000 + 152,000 illegal Roma in 700 camps | Sinti, Ursari, Kalderash, Xoraxane |
| Kosovo | Southeastern Europe | 15,696 | |
| Latvia | Northeastern Europe | 8,482 (2012 est.) or 13,000–15,000 | Lofitka Roma (in same Baltic Romani dialect family as Polska Roma and Ruska Roma) |
| Lithuania | Central / Northeastern Europe | 3,000–4,000 | |
| Luxembourg | Western Europe | 100–150 | |
| North Macedonia | Southeastern Europe | 53,879 Roma and 3,843 Balkan Egyptians to 100,000 | Yerli, Gurbeti, Cergari, Egyptians |
| Mexico | North America | 16,000 | Kale, Boyash, Machwaya, Lovari, Gitanos, Kalderash |
| Moldova | Eastern / Southeastern Europe | 9,323 (2014 census); 20,000 (government estimate) | Rusurja, Ursari, Kalderash |
| Montenegro | Southeastern Europe | 2,601 to 20,000, additionally 8,000 registered Roma refugees from Kosovo, the entire number of IDP Kosovarian Roma in Montenegro is twice as large. | |
| Netherlands | Western Europe | 35,000–40,000 | |
| New Zealand | Oceania | 132 | |
| Norway | Northern Europe | 6,500 or more | Romanisael, Vlax |
| Poland | Central / Eastern Europe | 15,000–60,000 | Polska Roma |
| Portugal | Southern / Western Europe | 40,000 | |
| Romania | Eastern / Southeastern Europe | 569,477 (2021 census); 1,850,000 (CoE estimate) | Kalderash, Ursari, Lovari, Vlax, Romungro, Turkish Roma |
| Russia | Eastern Europe / North Asia | 182,766 (census 2002) or 450,000–1,000,000 (estimated) | Ruska Roma (descended from Polska Roma, from Poland), Kalderash (from Moldova), Servy (from Ukraine and Balkans), Ursari (from Bulgaria) Lovare, Wallachian Roma (from Wallachia) |
| Serbia | Southeastern Europe | 147,604 (census 2011) or 400,000–800,000 (estimated) | See Romani people in Serbia. Main sub-groups include "Turkish Gypsies", "White Gypsies", "Wallachian Gypsies" and "Hungarian Gypsies". |
| Slovakia | Central / Eastern Europe | 92,500 or 550,000 | Romungro |
| Slovenia | Central / Southeastern Europe | 3,246–10,000 | |
| Spain | Southern / Western Europe | 1,000,000 (official estimation); 600,000–800,000 or 1,500,000 | Gitanos, Kalderash, Boyash, Erromintxela |
| Sweden | Northern Europe | 30,000–65,000 | Romanisael, Vlax (Kalderash, Lovara), Kàlo |
| Switzerland | Central / Western Europe | 30,000–35,000 | |
| Turkey | West Asia / Southeastern Europe | 35,000 to 5,000,000 | Romani people in Turkey |
| Ukraine | Eastern Europe | 47,587 (census 2001) or 400,000 (estimated) | Kelderare (Hungarian name for Kotlyary; Zakarpattia), Kotlyary (other Ukrainian regions), Ruska Roma (northern Ukraine), Servy (Serby, southern and central Ukraine, from Serbia), Lovare (central Ukraine), Kelmysh, Crymy (in Crimea), Servica Roma (in Zakarpattia from Slovakia), Ungriko Roma (in Zakarpattia from Hungary) |
| United Kingdom | Northern / Western Europe | 44,000–94,000+ Unspecified number of Romani immigrants from Eastern Europe (among them in 2004 there were 4,100 Vlax Roma) and additionally 200,000 recent migrants | Romanichal, Kale |
| United States | North America | 1,000,000 (Romani ancestry. Romani organizations' estimate) | |
| Uruguay | South America | 2,000–5,000 | |
| Venezuela | South America | 2,000–5,000 | Gitanos, Gurbeti, Kalderash, Xaladitka Roma, Ciganos, Manouche |

(Romani people) Roma (Gypsy) population by country
| Country | Official | Source | Low estimate | High estimate | Note |
|---|---|---|---|---|---|
| Albania | 8,301 | (2011 census) | 80,000 | 150,000 | Roma population lives in 71 communes. |
| Algeria | – | – | 2,500 | 40,000 | |
| Angola | – | – | 12,000 | 16,000 | |
| Argentina | – | – | 300,000 | 350,000 | |
| Australia | 775 | (2011 census) | 5,000 | 25,000 | |
| Austria | 6,273 | (2001 census) | 20,000 | 50,000 | |
| Belarus | 6,848 | (2019 census) | 25,000 | 70,000 | Roma population lives in 104 districts. |
| Belgium | – | – | 20,000 | 40,000 | |
| Bosnia and Herzegovina | 12,583 | (2013 census) | 40,000 | 76,000 | Roma population lives in 92 municipalities. In 3 villages the Roma are the majority. |
| Brazil | 800,000 | (2010 census) | 680,000 | 1,000,000 | The 2010 IBGE Brazilian National Census encountered Romani camps in 291 of Brazil's 5,565 municipalities. |
| Bulgaria | 325,343 | (2011 census) | 700,000 | 800,000 | Roma population lives in 258 municipalities. In 43 villages and 1 town, the Roma are the majority. |
| Canada | 5,255 | (2011 census) | 5,000 | 80,000 | |
| Chile | – | – | 15,000 | 20,000 | |
| Colombia | 4,858 | (2005 census) | 6,000 | 8,000 | |
| Croatia | 16,975 | (2011 census) | 30,000 | 40,000 | |
| Cyprus | – | – | 1,000 | 1,500 | |
| Czech Republic | 4,458 | (2021 census) | 150,000 | 250,000 | |
| Ecuador | – | – | 2,000 | 2,000 | |
| Estonia | 676 | (2021 census) | 600 | 1,500 | |
| Denmark | – | – | 1,000 | 4,000 | |
| Finland | – | – | 10,000 | 12,000 | |
| France | – | – | 500,000 | 1,200,000 | |
| (Georgia (country)) Georgia | 1,744 | (1989 census) | 1,500 | 2,500 | |
| Germany | – | – | 70,000 | 140,000 | |
| Greece | – | – | 100,000 | 300,000 | |
| Hungary | 309,632 | (2016 census) | 600,000 | 1,000,000 | |
| (Republic of Ireland) Ireland | 30,987 | (2016 census) | 30,000 | 42,000 | |
| Italy | 29,438 | (2018 census) | 120,000 | 180,000 | Only a minority, estimated at 26,000 people, live in authorized slums. In 148 "formal" slums live 16,400 people, of which 43% are Italian. In the "tolerated" micro-settlement there are 9,600 Roma with Romanian 86% and Bulgarian 14% EU passports. |
| Kosovo* | 35,784 | (2011 census) | 25,000 | 50,000 | Roma population lives in 29 municipalities. In 3 villages the Roma are the majority. |
| Latvia | 5,082 | (2018 statistics) | 9,000 | 16,000 | |
| Lithuania | 2,251 | (2021 census) | 2,000 | 4,000 | |
| Luxembourg | – | – | 100 | 500 | |
| Mexico | – | – | 15,000 | 50,000 | |
| Moldova | 9,323 | (2014 census) | 14,200 | 20,000 | Roma population lives in 35 districts. In two villages and a town, the Roma are the majority or plurality. |
| Montenegro | 6,251 | (2011 census) | 15,000 | 25,000 | |
| Netherlands | – | – | 32,000 | 48,000 | |
| New Zealand | 132 | (2018 census) | 1,500 | 3,000 | |
| North Macedonia | 46,433 | (2021 census) | 134,000 | 260,000 | Roma population lives in 62 municipalities. |
| Norway | – | – | 4,500 | 15,700 | |
| Peru | – | – | 8,000 | 10,000 | |
| Poland | 12,855 | (2002 census) | 15,000 | 50,000 | |
| Portugal | – | – | 34,000 | 70,000 | |
| Romania | 569,477 | (2021 census) | 1,200,000 (CoE) | 1,850,000 (CoE) | |
| Russia | 205,007 | (2010 census) | 450,000 | 1,200,000 | |
| Serbia | 147,604 | (2011 census) | 400,000 | 800,000 | Roma population lives in 115 municipalities. |
| Slovakia | 67,179 | (2021 census) | 380,000 | 600,000 | Roma population lives in 78 of the districts. |
| Slovenia | 3,246 | (2002 census) | 7,000 | 10,000 | |
| South Africa | – | – | 8,500 | 10,000 | |
| South Ossetia* | 6 | (2015 census) | 15 | 20 | |
| Spain | – | – | 500,000 | 1,100,000 | |
| Sweden | – | – | 35,000 | 65,000 | |
| Switzerland | – | – | 25,000 | 35,000 | |
| Turkey | – | – | 500,000 | 5,000,000 | |
| Ukraine | 47,587 | (2001 census) | 120,000 | 400,000 | |
| United Kingdom | 63,193 | (2011 census) | 150,000 | 300,000 | |
| United States | – | – | 1,000,000 | 1,000,000 | |
| Uruguay | – | – | 2,000 | 5,000 | |

== Central and Eastern Europe ==
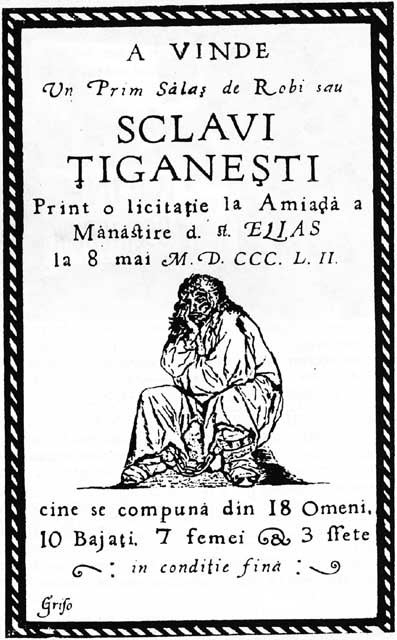
An 1852 Wallachian poster advertising an auction of Romani slaves

A significant proportion of the world's Romani people live in Central and Eastern Europe. However, in some cases—notably the Kalderash clan in Romania, who work as traditional coppersmiths—they have prospered. Some Roma families choose to immigrate to Western Europe. Many of the former Communist countries like the Czech Republic, Slovakia, Romania, Hungary and Bulgaria have entered the European Union, and free travel is permitted. During the 1970s and 1980s, many Roma from former Yugoslavia migrated to other European countries, especially Austria, West Germany and Sweden.

=== Albania ===
Romani people have been living in Albania for more than 600 years. They arrived from Asia shortly before the Ottoman Turks in the middle of the fifteenth century. They started from India, traveled towards the direction of Persia, Syria, Iraq and through Armenia into the Western Byzantine territories, then through the Balkans into Europe. 1,300-120,000 Roma are estimated to live in Albania.

=== Bulgaria ===
Romani people constitute the third largest ethnic group (after Bulgarians and Turks) in Bulgaria, they are referred to as "цигани" (cigani) or "роми" (romi). According to the 2001 census, there were 370,908 Roma in Bulgaria, equivalent to 4.7% of the country's total population.

=== Greece ===
The Romani people of Greece is currently estimated to be between 200,000 and 350,000 people.

=== Crete ===
Since 1323 the Romani people are mentioned in Crete. The majority of them settled in Nea Alikarnassos.

=== Hungary ===
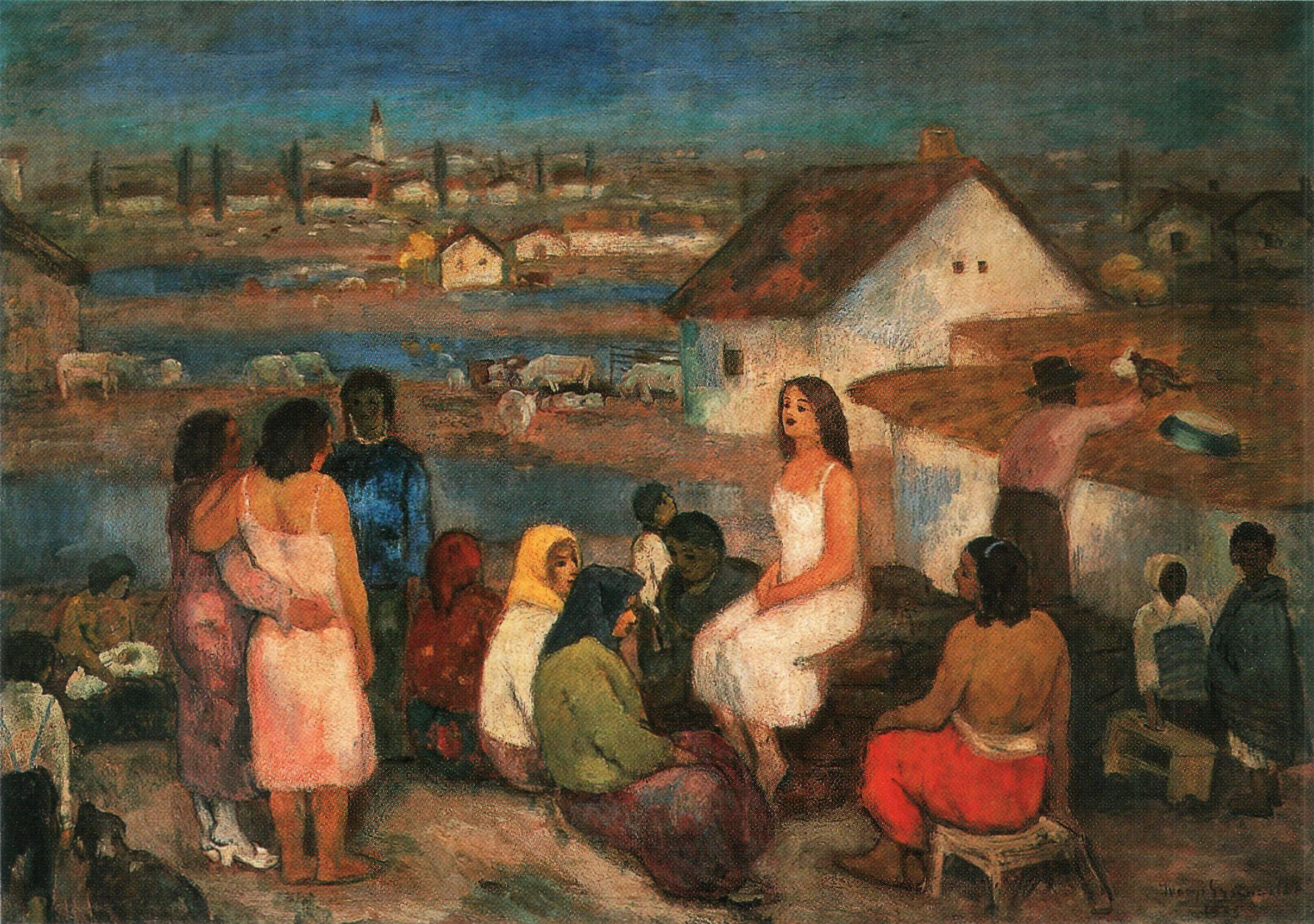
Gypsies at Balatonlelle by Béla Iványi-Grünwald, 1935

In the 2011 census, 315,583 people called themselves Roma. Various estimations put the number of Roma people to be between 500,000 and 1,000,000 people, or 8–10% of Hungary's population.

=== Romania ===
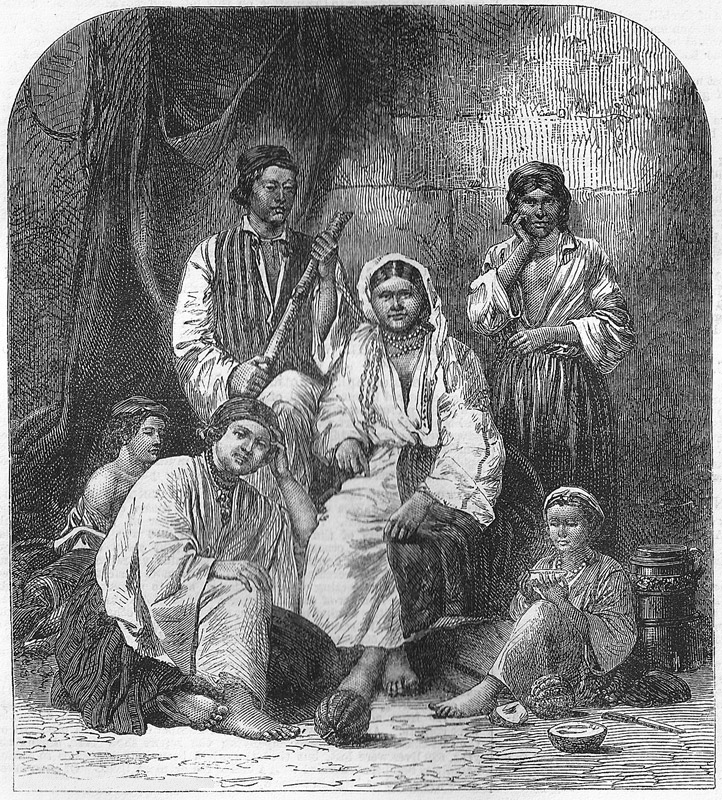
An engraving depicting a group of Romani people in Bucharest, Romania, 1865

There is a sizable Romani minority in Romania, known as Țigani in Romanian and, recently, as Rromi, of 569,477 people or 3.4% of the total population (2021 census). The Council of Europe estimated the figure to be 1.85 million people or 8.32% of the population in 2007, a figure difficult to verify due to the mobility of Romani and the reluctance of some to disclose their ethnicity.

In Romania, there exist a variety of governmental and non-governmental programs for integration and social advancement for the Romani, including the Foundation Policy Center for Roma and Minorities, the National Agency for the Roma and the Decade of Roma Inclusion in which Romania participated. Albania, Bosnia and Herzegovina, Bulgaria, Croatia, Czech Republic, Hungary, Macedonia, Montenegro, Romania, Serbia, Slovakia, and Spain participate in these programs. As an officially recognized ethnic minority, the Romani people also have guaranteed representation in the Parliament of Romania.

=== Moldova ===
A large Roma community of Eastern Orthodox Christian faith, are the Basketmakers in Glodeni, their ancestors migrated from Serbia, settled in Glodeni at the time of the Teleki Dynasty.

=== Russia ===
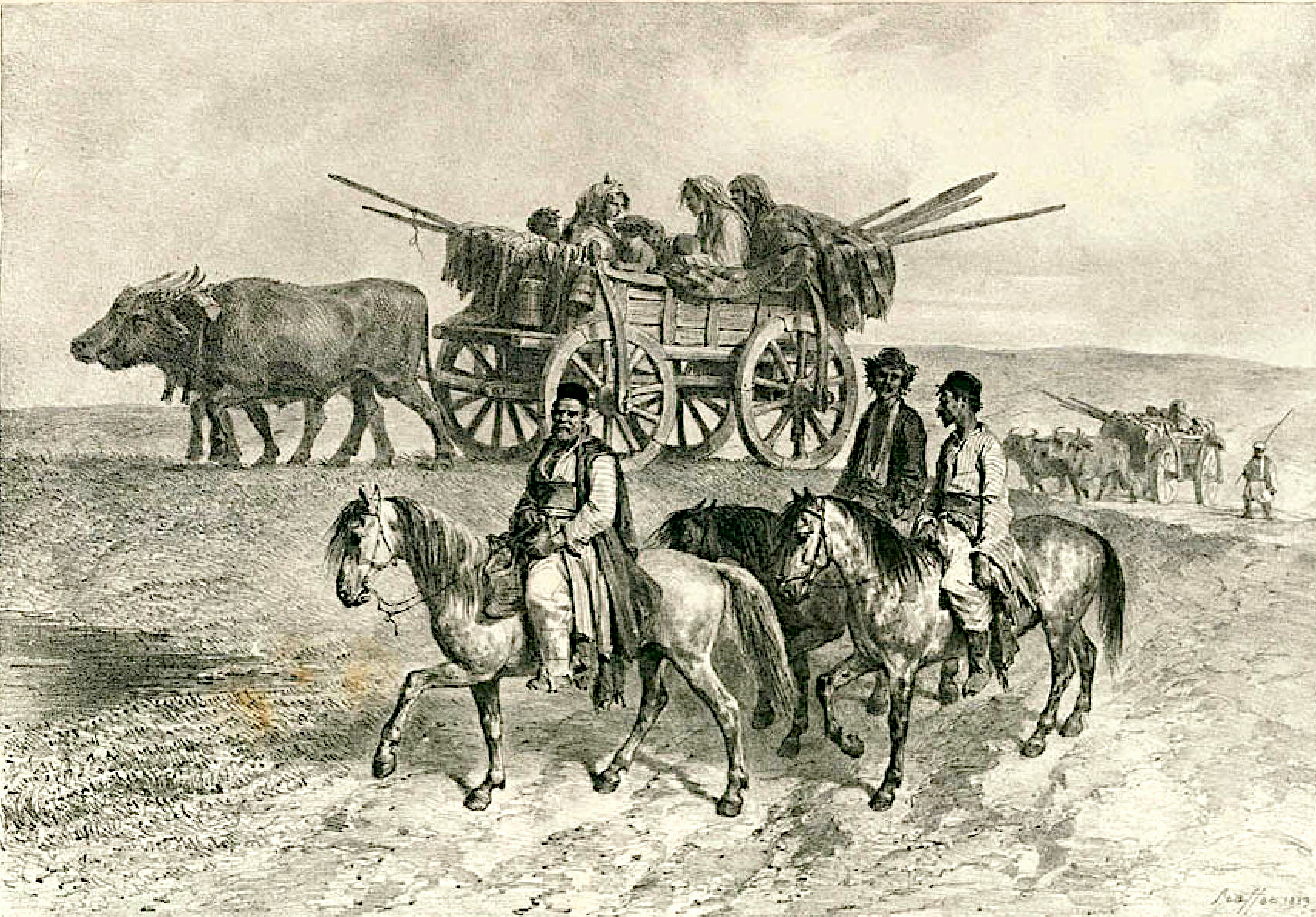
A Romani family travelling (1837 print)

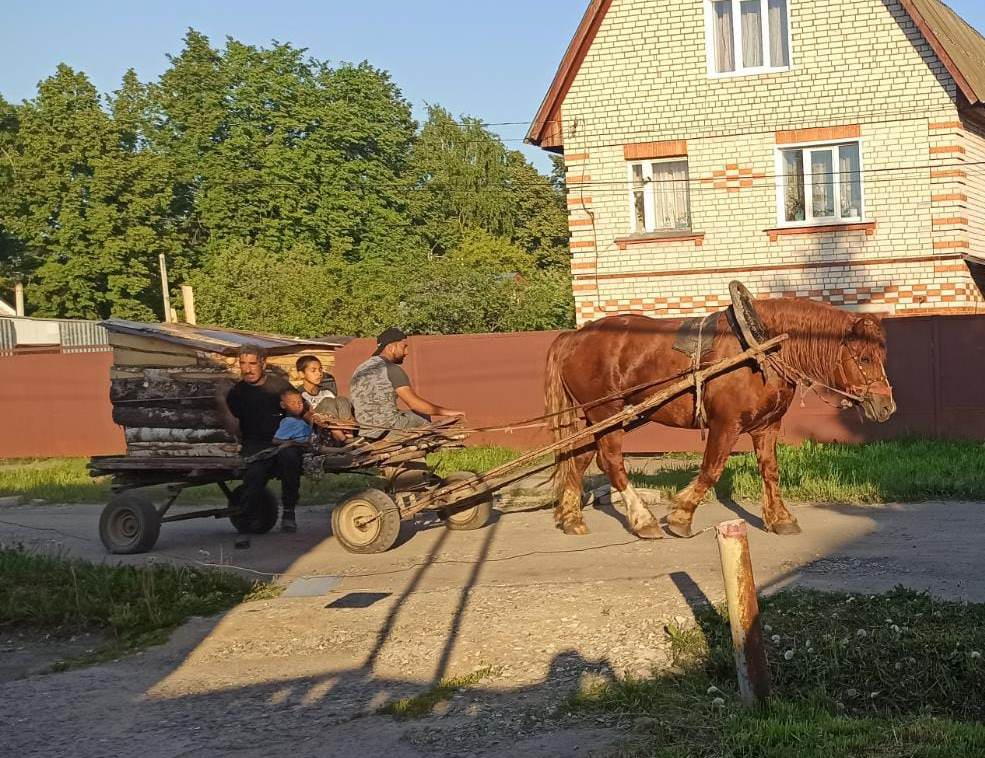
Romani people from Ivanovo Oblast

In Russian the Romani people are referred to as tzigane. The largest ethnic group of Romani people in Russia are the Ruska Roma (also known as Xaladytka Roma). They are also the largest group in Belarus. They are adherents of the Russian Orthodox faith.

They came to Russia in the 18th century from Poland, and their language includes Polish, German, and Russian words.

The Ruska Roma were nomadic horse traders and singers. They traveled during the summer and stayed in cottages of Russian peasants during the winter. They paid for their lodging with money, or with the work of their horses.

In 1812, when Napoleon I invaded Russia, the Romani diasporas of Moscow and Saint Petersburg gave large sums of money and good horses for the Russian army. Many young Romani men took part in the war as uhlans.

At the end of the 19th century, Rusko Rom Nikolai Shishkin created a Romani theatre troupe. One of its plays was in the Romani language.

During World War II some Ruska Roma entered the army, by call-up and as volunteers. They took part in the war as soldiers, officers, infantrymen, tankmen, artillerymen, aviators, drivers, paramedical workers, and doctors. Some teenagers, old men and adult men were also partisans. Romani actors, singers, musicians, dancers (mostly women) performed for soldiers in the front line and in hospitals. A huge number of Roma, including many of the Ruska Roma, died or were murdered in territories occupied by the enemy, in battles, and in the blockade of Leningrad.

After World War II, the music of the Ruska Roma became very popular. Romen Theatre, Romani singers and ensembles prospered. All Romanies living in the USSR began to perceive Ruska Roma culture as the basic Romani culture.

=== Slovenia ===
It is estimated that between 10,000 and 12,000 Roma live in Slovenia.

=== Kosovo ===
Kosovan Roma speak either Serbian or Romani as their first language. Most Kosovan Roma are Christian Orthodox, but some practice Islam. 2010 OSCE estimates suggested that there were approximately 34,000 Roma living in Kosovo.

=== Germany ===
Roma in Germany are estimated to around 170,000-300,000 individuals, constituting around 0.2-0.4% of the German population.

=== Czech Republic ===
There are estimated to be around 262,000 Romani people in the Czech Republic, constituting around 2.4% of the total population of the Czech Republic.

=== Poland ===
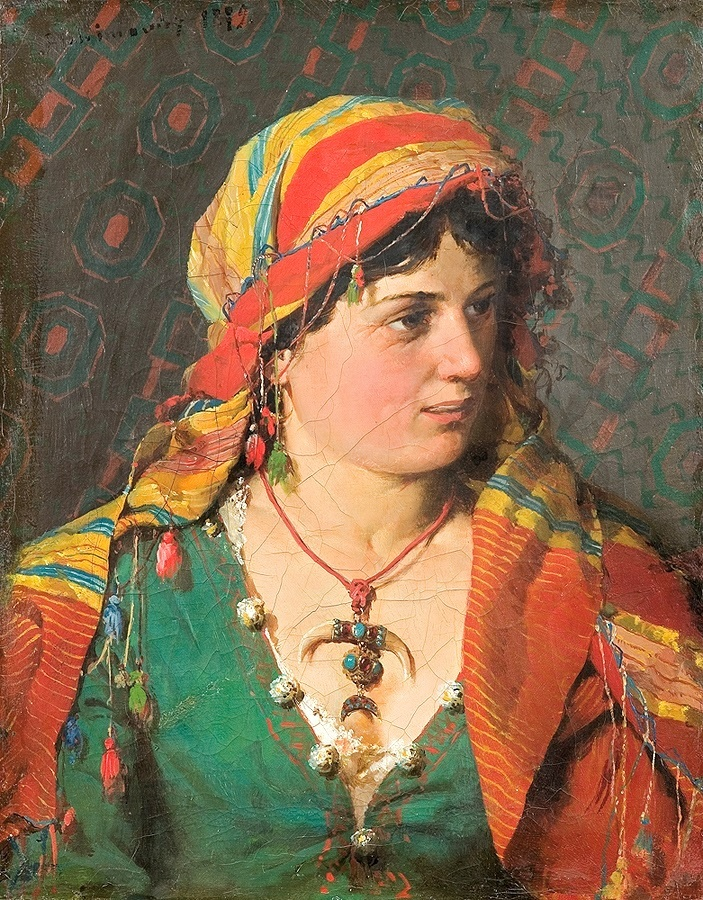
Gypsy by Polish painter Kazimierz Alchimowicz, 1870s

In 2011, 17,049 citizens of Poland identified themselves as Roma. The number of Roma in Poland is estimated to be between 25,000 and 30,000.

=== Slovakia ===
There are estimated to be approximately 400,000 Romani people in Slovakia, constituting around 8% of the total population of Slovakia.

=== Croatia ===
In the 2021 Croatian Census, 17,980 citizens of Croatia identified themselves as Roma, constituting 0.46% of the total population of Croatia.

=== Switzerland ===
Around 80,000 to 100,000 Roma live in Switzerland.

== Western Europe ==
=== Belgium ===
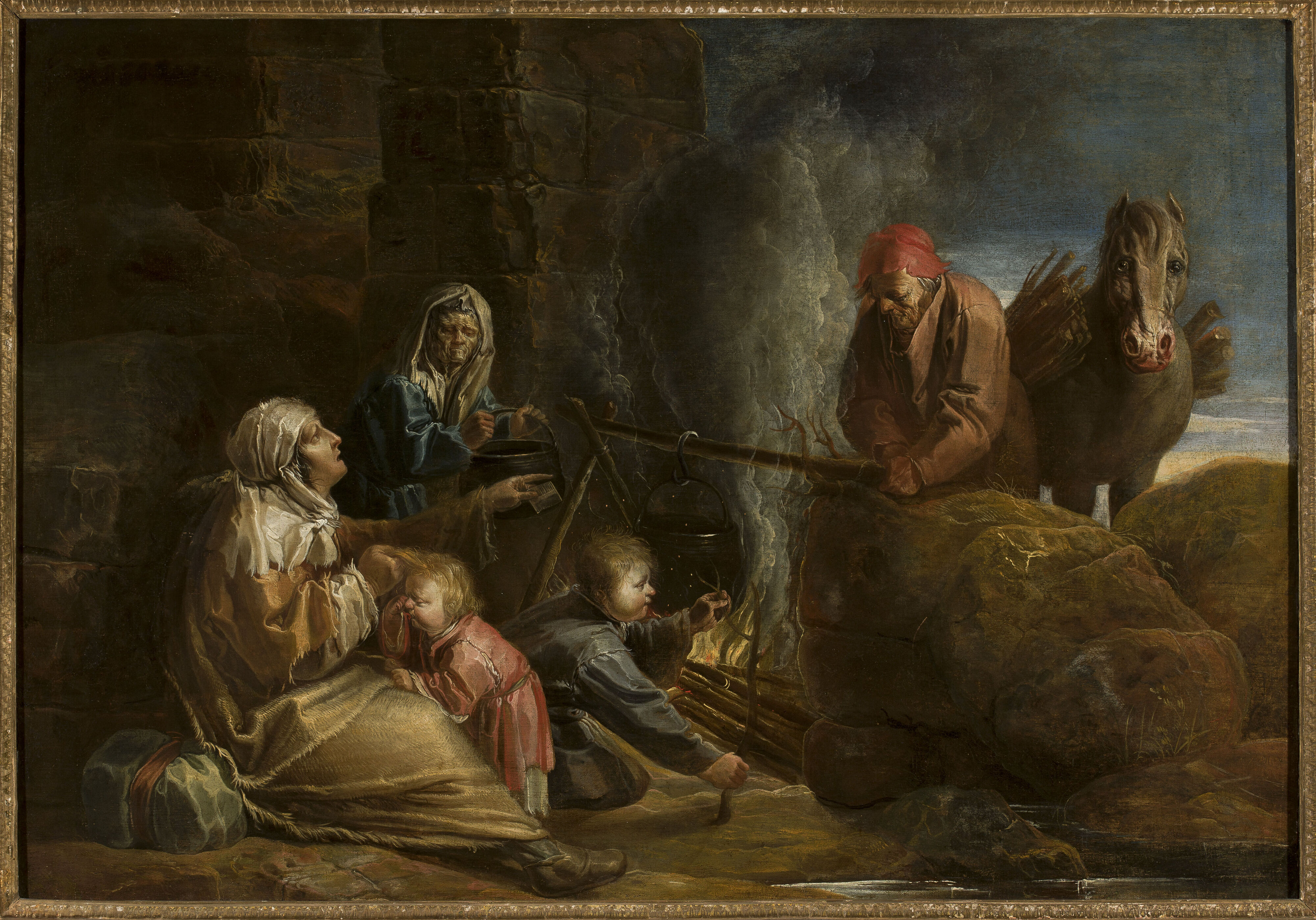
Gypsy Camp by Jan van de Venne, depicting a 17th century Romani encampment in what is now Belgium

There are about 30,000 Romani people in Belgium. Romani citizens of Belgium are generally described as Roms, Manouches or Sinti, while others may use additional names.

=== Spain ===
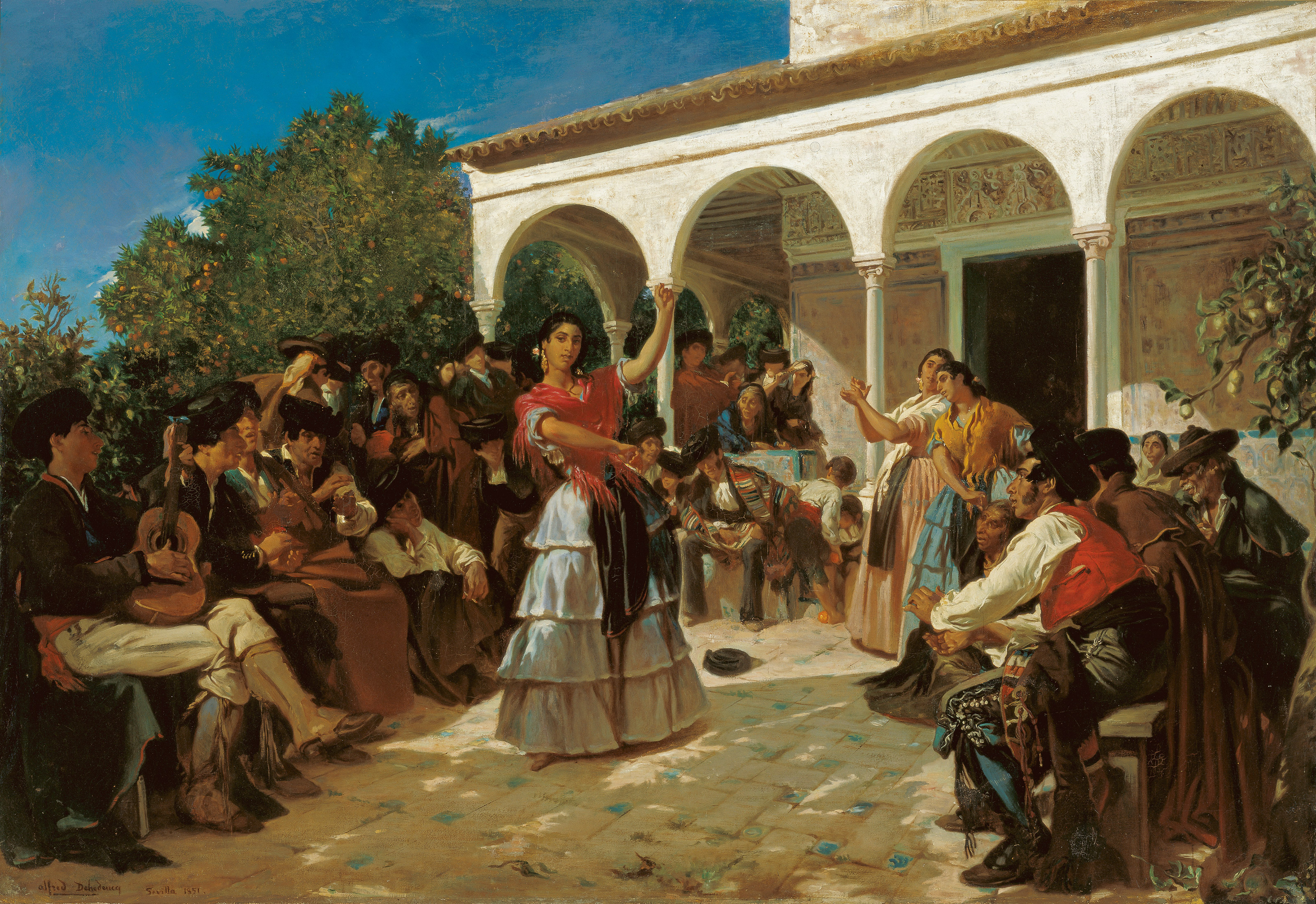
A Gypsy Dance in the Gardens of Alcázar by Alfred Dehodencq, Spain, 1851

Romanies in Spain are generally known as Gitanos and tend to speak Caló, a kind of Andalusian Spanish with a large number of Romani loanwords. Estimates of the Spanish Gitano population range between 600,000 and 1,500,000 with the Spanish government estimating between 650,000 and 700,000. Semi-nomadic Quinqui consider themselves apart from the Gitanos.

=== Portugal ===
Romanies in Portugal are known as Ciganos, and their presence goes back to the second half of the 15th century. Early on, due to their socio-cultural difference and nomadic style of live, the Ciganos were the object of fierce discrimination and persecution.

The number of Ciganos in Portugal is difficult to estimate, since there are no official statistics about race or ethnic categories. According to data from Council of Europe's European Commission against Racism and Intolerance there are about 40,000 to 50,000 spread all over the country. According to the Portuguese branch of Amnesty International, there are about 30,000 to 50,000.

=== France ===
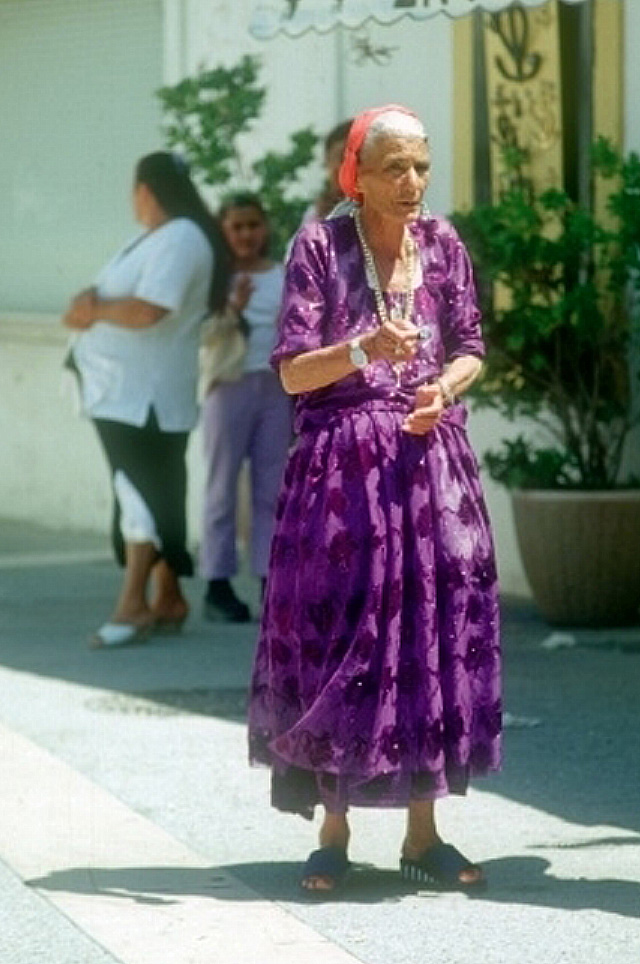
Fortune teller in the Romani shrine of Saintes-Maries-de-la-Mer.

Romanies are generally known in spoken French as Manouches or Tsiganes. Romanichels or Gitans are considered pejorative and Bohémiens is outdated. Traditionally referred to as gens du voyage ("traveling people"), a term still occasionally used by the media, they are today generally referred to as Roms or Rroms. By law, French municipalities over 5,000 inhabitants have the obligation to allocate a piece of land to Romani travellers when they arrive.

Approximately 500,000 Romani people live in France as part of established communities. Additionally, the French Roma rights group FNASAT reports that there are at least 12,000 Roma, primarily from Romania and Bulgaria, living in illegal urban camps throughout the country. French authorities often close down these encampments. In 2009, the government returned more than 10,000 Roma illegal immigrants to Romania and Bulgaria. In the summer of 2012, with mounting criticism of their deportation of Roma migrants, French key ministers met for emergency talks on the handling of an estimated 15,000 Roma living in camps across France. They proposed to lift restrictions on migrants (including Roma) from Bulgaria and Romania who were working in France.

=== Italy ===
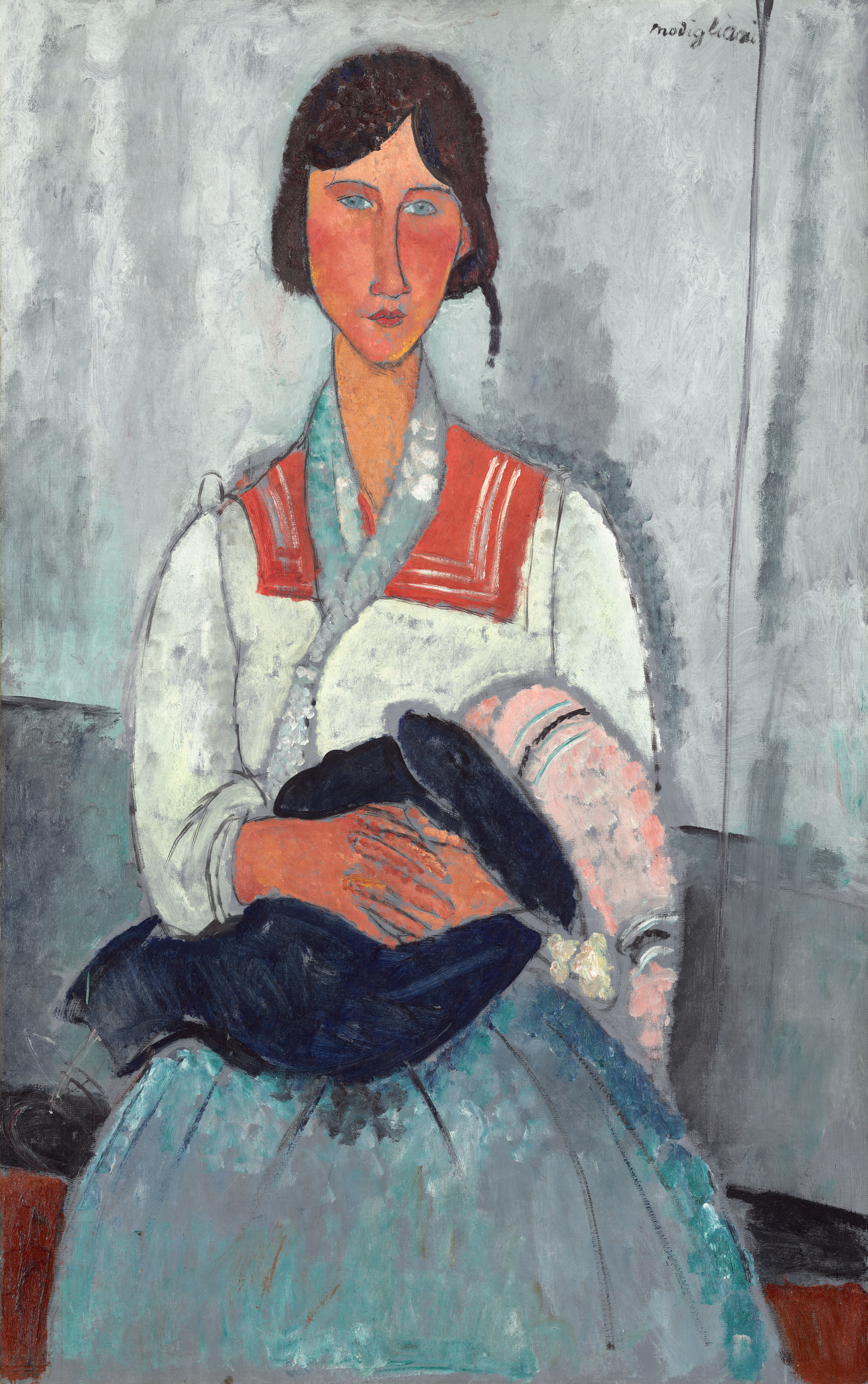
Gypsy Woman with Baby by Amedeo Modigliani, 1919

Romani in Italy are generally known as zingaro (with the plural zingari), a word also used to describe a scruffy or slovenly person or a tinker. The word is likely of Greek origin meaning "untouchables", compare the modern Greek designations Τσιγγάνοι (Tsingánoi), Αθίγγανοι (Athínganoi). People often use the term "Rom", although the people prefer Romani (in Italian Romanì), which is little used. They are sometimes called "nomads", although many live in settled communities.

=== Netherlands ===
Approximately 37,500 Roma reside in the Netherlands (0.24% of the Dutch population).

=== Luxembourg ===
Approximately 300 Romani people live in Luxembourg (0.06% of the population).

== Northern Europe ==
Romani subgroups in Northern Europe include:

1. Romanichal in England (As well as northeast Wales, south Wales and the Scottish borders), with diaspora communities in the United States, Canada, South Africa, Australia and New Zealand.
2. Romanisæl in Norway (particularly central Norway) and Sweden.
3. Scottish Lowland Romani in the Scottish Lowlands.
4. Kale in Wales, particularly in the northwest.
5. Kaale in Finland and parts of Sweden.

Romani who have resided in Northern Europe for centuries have much European ancestry and thus may appear indistinguishable to the indigenous peoples of the region. This is due to their ancestors mixing heavily with indigenous peoples of Europe over the centuries, particularly Traveller groups (the Romani in Britain mixed with Irish Travellers, Scottish Highland Travellers and Funfair Travellers while Romani in Scandinavia mixed with Indigenous Norwegian Travellers).

It is also a reason why these groups speak mixed languages rather than more purer forms of Romani:

- Romanichal speak Angloromani (a mix of English and Romani).
- Romanisæl speak Scandoromani (a mix of Norwegian, Swedish and Romani).
- Scottish Lowland Romani speak Scottish Cant (a mix of Scots and Romani).
- Kale speak Kalá (a mix of Welsh, English and Romani).
- Kaale speak Kalo (a mix of Finnish and Romani).

=== Denmark ===
The Council of Europe estimates that there are around 5,500 Romani living in Denmark (0.1% of the population).

=== Estonia ===
The Romani population in Estonia is small. The official number of Romani people in Estonia is 584 with the average estimate of 1,250, and Romani people are estimated to make up 0.1% of the population. The oldest data on Romani people in Estonia date back to the year 1533.

=== Iceland ===
Romani families from Romania, Bulgarian and Poland have been living and working in Iceland as part of the East European labour migrant communities.

=== United Kingdom ===
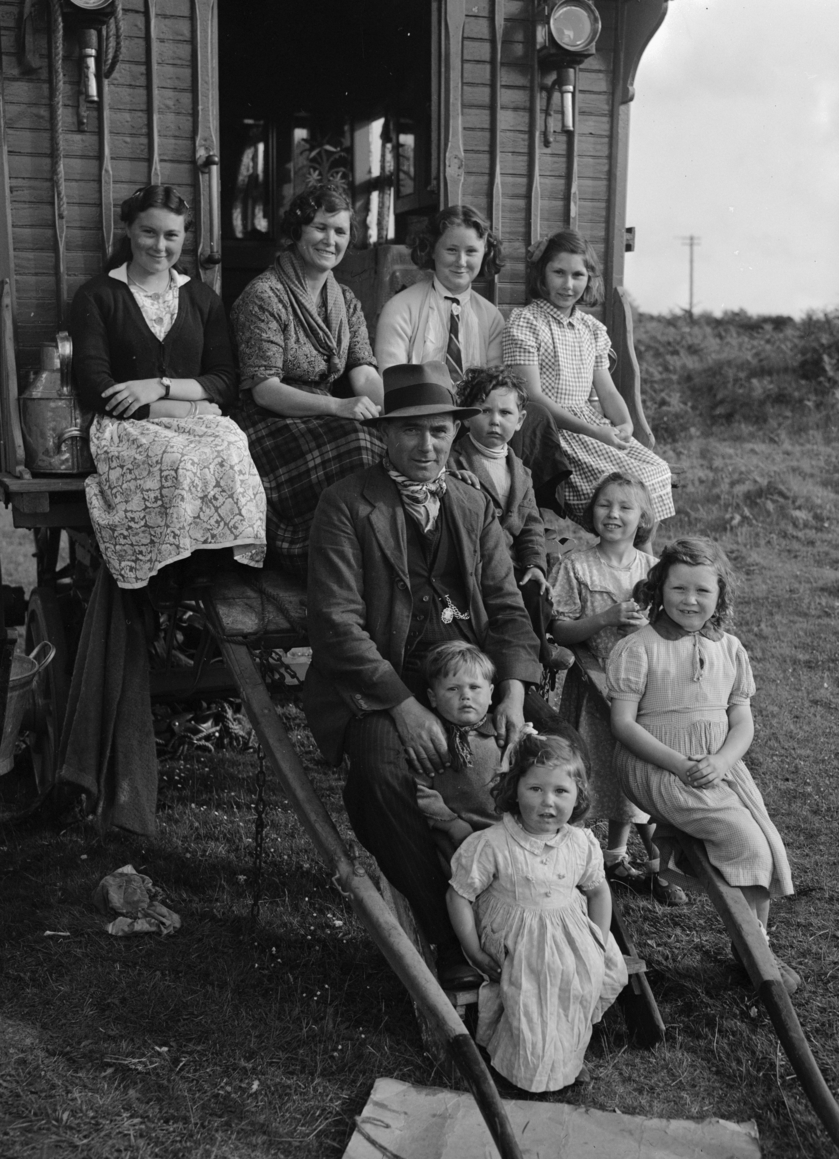
A Romani family in Gwynedd, Wales, 1951

Romani people in England, Scotland and Wales generally call themselves “Gypsies”, “Romani Gypsies”, “Romany” or “Romanies”.

Romanichal are found in England (As well as South Wales, Northeast Wales and the Scottish Borders), and they speak Angloromani.

Kale are found in Wales, especially the Welsh-speaking parts of Northwestern Wales, and they speak Welsh Kalá.

Lowland Romany are found in the Scottish Lowlands. They speak Scottish Cant.

Romani have been recorded in the UK since at least the early 16th century. Records of Romani people in Scotland date to the early 16th century.

A number of Romanichal emigrated to the United States during the centuries. Romani number around 300,000 in the UK. This includes a sizable population of Romani migrants from continental Europe, particularly Central and Eastern Europe, who immigrated into the UK in the late 1990s/early 2000s, and also after EU expansion in 2004.

According to the Scottish Traveller Education Programme, an estimated 20,000 Romani people and Travellers live in Scotland.

The first recorded reference to "the Egyptians" appeared to be in 1492, during the reign of James IV, when an entry in the Book of the Lord High Treasurer records a payment "to Peter Ker of four shillings, to go to the king at Hunthall, to get letters subscribed to the 'King of Rowmais'". Two days after, a payment of twenty pounds was made at the king's command to the messenger of the 'King of Rowmais'.

In some parts of the UK, the Romani may be referred to as "tinkers" because of their traditional trade as tinsmiths.

According to the Northern Ireland Census, the Romani population in Northern Ireland was 1,500.

=== Finland ===
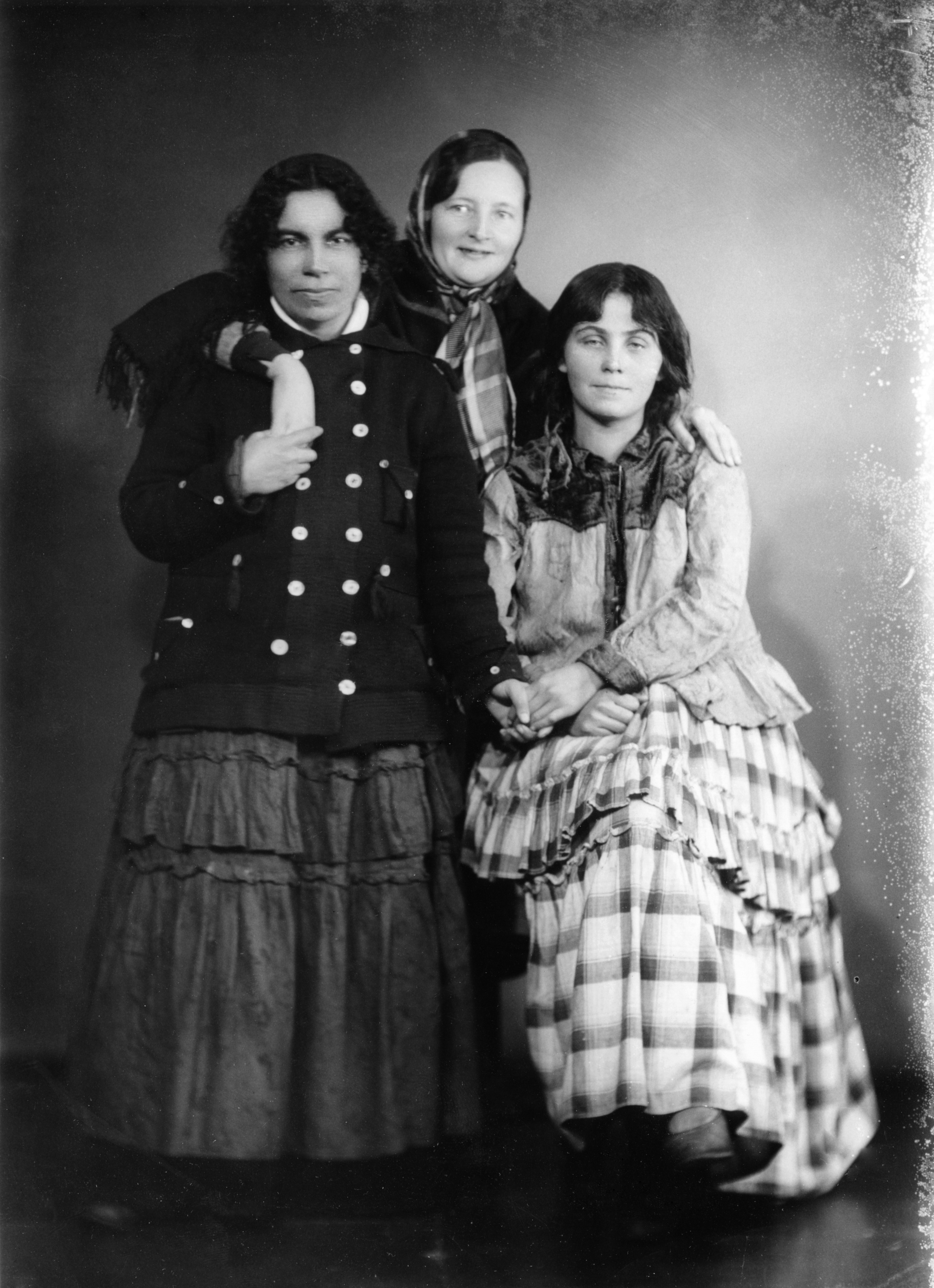
Three Romani women in Helsinki, Finland, 1930s

The Kaale Romani in Finland are known in Finnish as mustalaiset ('blacks', cf. Romani: kalò, 'black') or romanit. Approximately 10,000 Romani live in Finland, mostly in the Helsinki Metropolitan Area. In Finland, many Romani people wear their traditional dress in daily life. Kaale speak Finnish Kalo.

=== Sweden and Norway ===
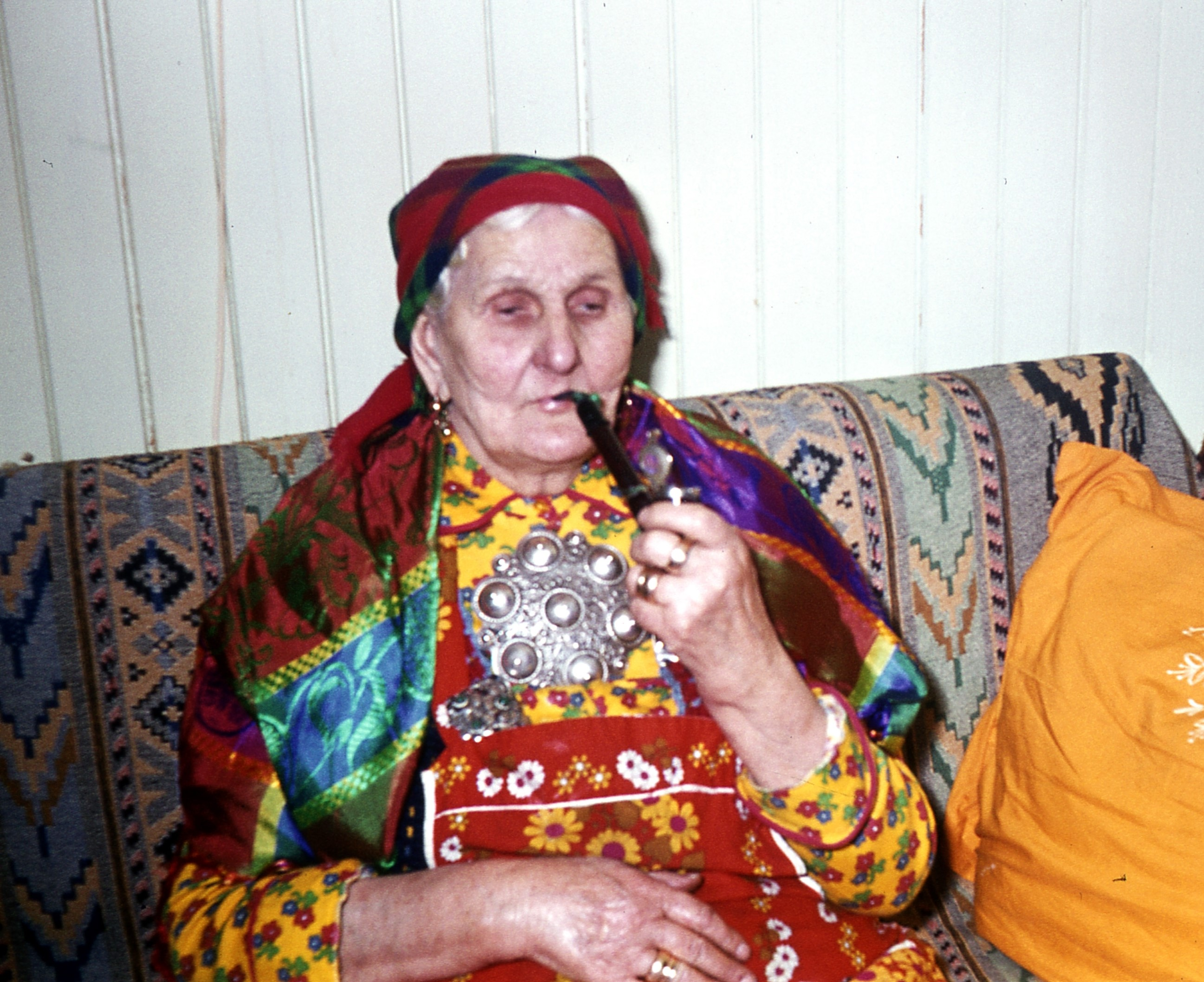
Romani woman in Norway

Romanisæl are the Romani subgroup of Sweden and Norway. They speak Scandoromani.

Recently the term romer has been adopted as a collective designation which encompasses Romanisæl and Eastern European Roma migrant communities.

Approximately 120,000 Romani live in Sweden, including 65,000~ Romanisæl, 3,000~ Kaale, who have migrated from Finland since the 1960s, and 50,000~ Eastern European Roma, who have only started to immigrate to Sweden and Norway in recent years.

Romanisæl in Sweden have periodically suffered discrimination at the hands of the state. For example, the state has taken children into foster care, or sterilised Romani women without their consent. Prejudice against Romani is widespread, with most stereotypes portraying the Romani as welfare cheats, shoplifters, and con artists. For example, in 1992, Bert Karlsson, a leader of Ny Demokrati, said, "Gypsies are responsible for 90% of crime against senior citizens" in Sweden. He had earlier tried to ban Romani from his Skara Sommarland theme park, as he thought they were thieves. Some shopkeepers, employers and landlords continue to discriminate against Romani.

The situation is improving. Several Romani organisations promote education about Romani rights and culture in Sweden. Since 2000, Romani chib is an officially recognised minority language in Sweden. The Swedish government has established a special standing Delegation for Romani Issues. A Romani folk high school has been founded in Gothenburg.

=== Latvia ===
The Romani people are one of the oldest ethnic minorities in Latvia. According to the Office for Citizenship and Migration Affairs there were 7,456 Romani living in Latvia as of 1 January 2017, comprising 0.3% of the total population.

=== Lithuania ===
According to The Department of Statistics under the Government of the Republic of Lithuania, in 2011 general population and housing census data shows that 2,115 Romani people lived in Lithuania. They are concentrated in Vilnius, Kaunas, Šiauliai, Panevėžys and Šalčininkai in Lithuania. Kirtimai is the largest Romani settlement in Vilnius.

== West Asia ==
One route taken by the medieval proto-Romani cut across Indian Subcontinent to Roman Egypt and Asia Minor to Europe. Numerous Romani continue to live in Asia Minor. Other Romani populations in the Middle East are the result of modern migrations from Europe. Also found in the Middle East are various groups of the Dom people, often also identified as "gypsies". They are derived from a migration out of India between the 7th and 10th centuries.

=== Georgia ===
Approximately 1,500 Roma are registered in Georgia. They primarily live in Tbilisi and Gachiani.

=== Cyprus ===
==== History ====
Historians estimate that the first immigrants came between 1322 and 1400, when Cyprus was under the rule of the Lusignan (Crusader) kings. These Roma were part of a general movement from Asia Minor to Europe. Those who landed on Cyprus probably came across from the Crusader colonies on the eastern Mediterranean coast.

There is no evidence suggesting one cause for the Roma to leave mainland Asia, but historical events caused widespread upheaval and may have prompted a move to the island. In 1347 the Black Death had reached Constantinople, the capital of the Byzantine Empire; in 1390 the Turks defeated the Greek kingdom in Asia; and ten years later, the Battle of Aleppo marked the advance of the Mongols under Tamerlane.

The first surviving written record of Roma in Cyprus is from 1468. In the Chronicle of Cyprus compiled by Florio Bustron, the Cingani are said to have paid tax to the royal treasury, at that time under King James II. Later, in 1549, the French traveler Andre Theret found "les Egyptiens ou Bohemiens" in Cyprus and other Mediterranean islands. He noted their simple way of life, supported by the production of nails by the men and belts by the women, which they sold to the local population.

During the Middle Ages, Cyprus was on a regular shipping route from Bari, Italy to the Holy Land. Second immigration likely took place sometime after the Turks dominated the island in 1571. Some Kalderash came in the 19th century.

Currently, Muslim Roma in Cyprus refer to themselves as Gurbeti, and their language as Kurbetcha, although most no longer speak it. Christian or Greek-speaking Roma are known as Mantides.

According to the Council of Europe there are 1000–1500 (0.16%) Romanis living in Cyprus .

==== Names of Roma in Cyprus ====
- Tsinganos: the official term used in Greek documents and written material. It comes from the term Cingani (used in the 1468 text), which in turn comes from the archaic word Adsincan, used in mediaeval Byzantium.
- Yiftos: the Cypriot dialect form of mainland Greek Yiftos. This is common in speech and comes from earlier Aigiptos, a reference to the earlier belief that the Romanies came from Egypt.
- Gurbeti: the local term used by Turkish-speaking Cypriots, a Roma group of Doms which is also present in Syria.

(For additional names of Roma in Greek-speaking Cyprus, see Roma in Greece)

=== Turkey ===
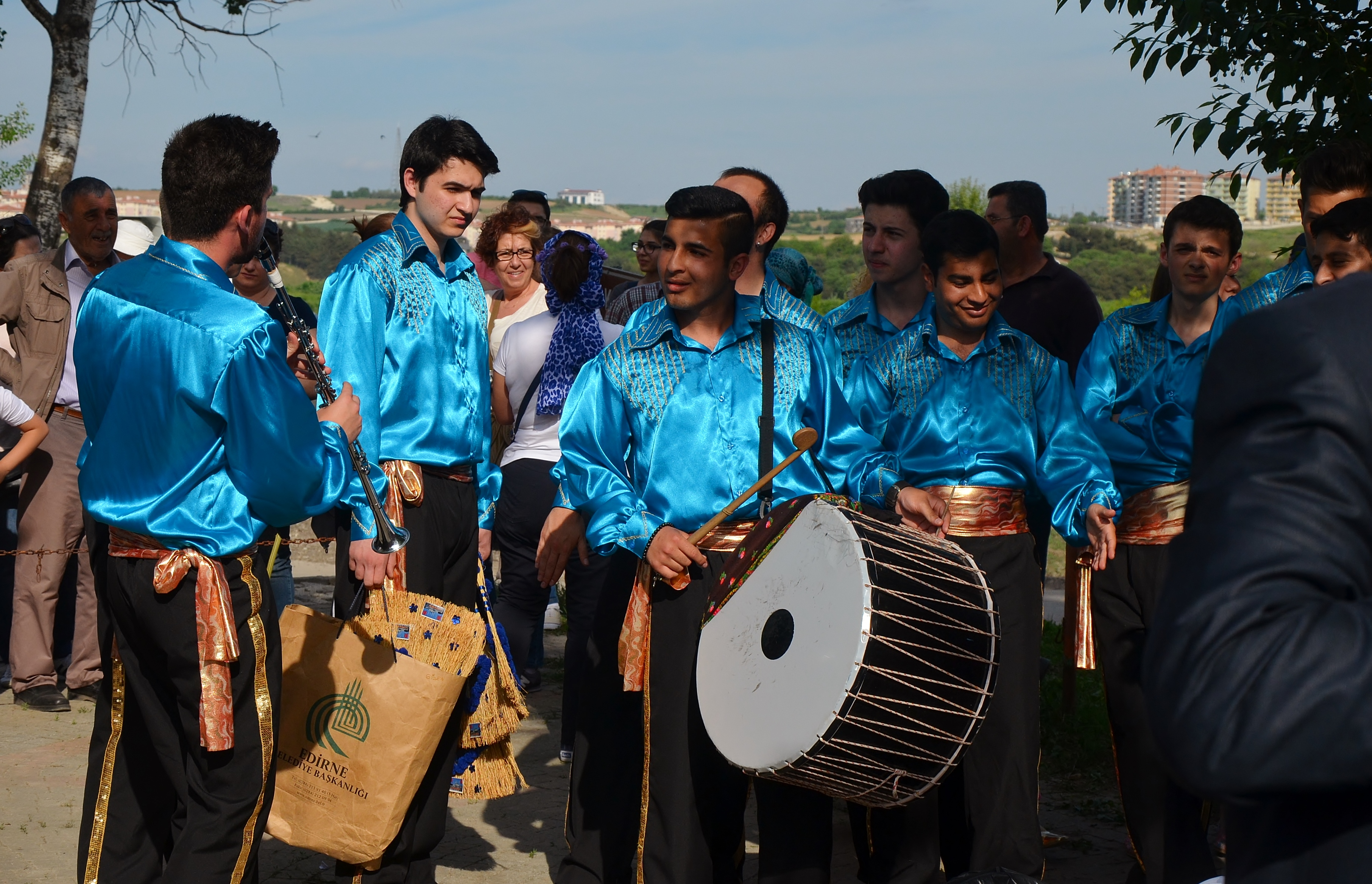
Romani people at a Kakava celebration in Edirne, 2015

Romani people in Turkey are generally known as Romanlar, Çingene, Çingen, or Çingan, as well as Çingit (West Black Sea region), Kıptî (meaning Coptic), Şopar (Kırklareli), Romanlar (İzmir) and Gipleri (derived from the term "Egyptian"). Music, blacksmithing and other handicrafts are their main occupations. The Romani population in Turkey is most concentrated in the west of the country, particularly East Thrace. Turkish tends to be the mother tongue of the Roma in Turkey but some also speak the Romani language.

== North America ==
Most Romani people in the Americas speak English, French, Spanish or Portuguese.

=== United States ===
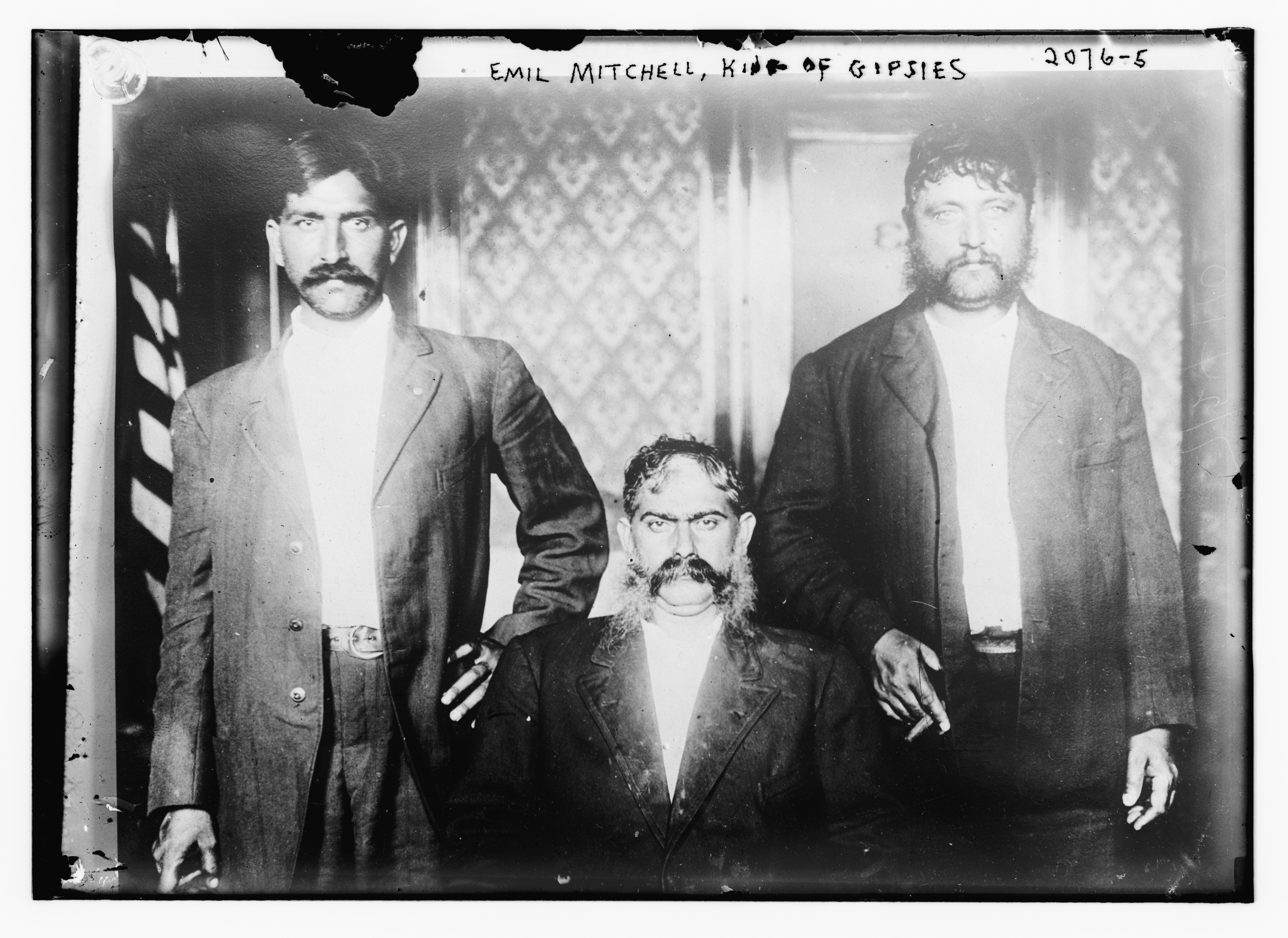
Romani men in the United States, 1900

At the beginning of the 19th century, the first major Romani group, the Romanichal from Great Britain, arrived in North America, although some had also immigrated during the colonial era. They settled primarily in the United States, which was then more established than most English-speaking communities in Upper Canada. Later immigrants also settled in Canada.

The ancestors of the majority of the contemporary local Romani population in the United States started to immigrate during the second half of the century, from Eastern Europe, drawn by opportunities for industrial jobs. Among these groups were the Romani-speaking peoples such as the Kalderash, Machvaya, Lovari and Churari, as well as groups who had adopted the Romanian language, such as the Boyash (Ludari). Most arrived either directly from Romania after their liberation from slavery between 1840 and 1850, or after a short-period in neighboring states, such as Russia, Serbia, Hungary or Bulgaria. The Bashalde arrived from what is now Slovakia (then part of Austria-Hungary) about the same time. Many settled in the major industrial cities of the era.

Immigration from Eastern Europe decreased drastically in the post-World War II era, during the years of Communist rule. It resumed in the 1990s after the fall of Communism. Romani organizations estimate that there are about one million Romani in the United States.

=== Cuba ===
An Afro-Romani population exists in central Cuba.

=== Barbados ===
England banished Romani people to Barbados during the colonial era. According to folklore, the Romani population intermarried with the local Indian population.

=== Guatemala ===
There is a Romani community in San José Acatempa.

=== El Salvador ===
There is a small Gitano community in El Salvador.

=== Canada ===
According to the 2006 Canadian census, there were 2,590 Canadians of full or partial Romani descent.

=== Mexico ===
According to data collected by the Instituto Nacional de Estadística y Geografía, the Romani in Mexico numbered 15,850, however, the total number is likely larger.

=== Caribbean ===
During the early modern era, Romani slaves were transported to European colonies in the Caribbean from the 15th to 18th centuries. The first Romani slaves to arrive in the Caribbean came as part of the third voyage of Christopher Columbus in 1498. In 1793, writer John Moreton noted in his work West India Customs and Manners that many Romani in Jamaica worked as prostitutes.

== South America ==
=== Argentina ===
The Romani people in Argentina number more than 300,000. They traditionally support themselves by trading used cars and selling their jewelry, while travelling all over the country.

=== Brazil ===
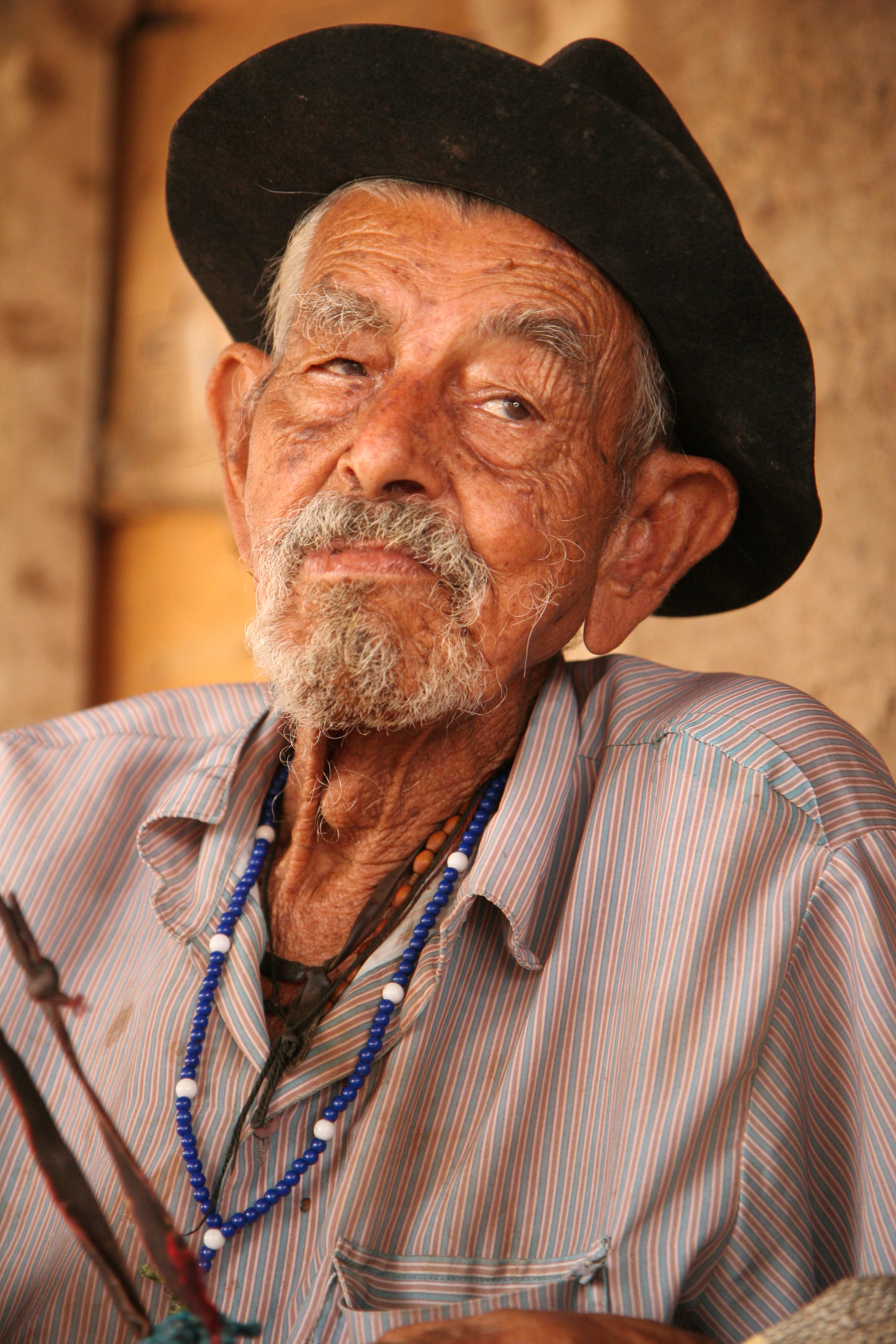
Romani man in Sousa, Paraíba, Brazil

Romani groups settled the Brazilian states of Espírito Santo, Rio de Janeiro and Minas Gerais primarily in the late 19th century. The Machvaya came from present-day Serbia (then Austria-Hungary), the Kalderash from Romania, the Lovari from Italy, and the Horahane from Greece and Turkey. Initially, the Romani people in Brazil were believed to be descended from ancestors who were exiled in the colony by the Portuguese Inquisition but more has been learned about the peoples. The current Roma population is estimated to be 600,000. Most are descended from ethnic Kalderash, Macwaia, Rudari, Horahane, and Lovara.

=== Chile ===
The Romani community of Chile continue semi-nomadic lifestyles, travelling between cities and living in small tented communities. A Chilean telenovela called Romane was based on the Romani people. It portrayed their lifestyles, ideas and occasionally featured the Chilean-born actors speaking in the Romani language, with subtitles in Spanish. They came to Chile from Serbia.

=== Colombia ===
The first Romani people in Colombia are thought to have come from Spain and were formerly known as Egipcios (lit. 'Egyptians'), settling primarily in the Departments of Santander, Norte de Santander, Atlántico, Tolima, Antioquia, Sucre, Bogotá D.C., and in smaller numbers in the Departments of Bolívar, Nariño, and Valle del Cauca.

In 1999, the Colombian Government recognized the Romani people as a national ethnic minority. Today, around 8,000 Roma are present in Colombia. Their language has been officially recognized as a minority language.

=== Ecuador ===
Romani people have been in Ecuador since the late 1800s and early 1900s. Ecuadorian Roma live in the provinces of Carchi, Imbabura, Cotopaxi, Pichincha, Tungurahua, Chimborazo, El Oro, Manab and El Guayas. It is estimated that there are 1,000 Roma in Ecuador.

=== Peru ===
There is a Romani community in Lima.

=== Venezuela ===
There is a Romani community in Venezuela, most of whom belong to the Calé subgroup. Most came in migration from Spain, Portugal, and France, due to persecution. They brought with them flamenco and the Caló language, and opened dance schools in Maracaibo, Caracas, and Valencia. A large amount of Judeo-Kale also came to Venezuela – some during the Spanish inquisition, and others fleeing as a result of rising anti-Romani sentiment in Spain. A population of around 5,000 Kalderash and Boyash Roma live in Venezuela as well.

== Africa ==
=== Angola ===
In spite of a ban introduced in 1720, a number of Romani families arrived in the country during the time when Angola was a Portuguese colony. It is unlikely the community survived to the present day.

=== South Africa ===
A small number of Kalderash live in South Africa.

=== Cape Verde ===
Romani people were banished to Cape Verde from Portugal.

=== São Tomé and Príncipe ===
Romani people were exiled from Portugal to São Tomé and Príncipe.

== Oceania ==
=== Australia ===
There is a small Romani population in Australia.

=== New Zealand ===
A small Romani community exists in New Zealand. According to the 2023 census 219 Roma individuals in New Zealand.

== Proposed recognition as part of the Indian diaspora ==
In March 1976, the International Roma Cultural Festival in Chandigarh, India received the support of then Prime Minister Indira Gandhi, who referred to the Roma as part of the global Indian diaspora.

In February 2016, during the International Roma Conference, then Indian Minister of External Affairs, Sushma Swaraj stated that the people of the Romani community were the "children of India". Advocates for the proposal who took part in the event, including Jovan Damjanovic, president of the World Roma Organisation (Rromanipen), have argued that recognition could provide the Roma with cultural affirmation, a stronger sense of belonging, and potential access to support from Indian institutions, while also symbolically addressing centuries of marginalization. Damjanovic stated in an exclusive interview with the Hindustan Times that if India were to accept this proposal, it would mark the first step towards opposing the negative perceptions surrounding the Romani people. He also noted that this could provide India with substantial cultural, economic, and political benefits. The conference ended with a recommendation to the Government of India to recognize the Romani community spread across 30 countries as a part of the Indian diaspora. Following that event, a starred question was raised in the Lok Sabha concerning whether Roma constituted part of the diaspora and whether any official study had been proposed to trace their origins. The Ministry of External Affairs (India) replied that the purpose of the 2016 conference was to revive cultural and linguistic ties, assess existing scholarship, and encourage further research, but not to accord formal diaspora recognition.

In April 2022, an international conference held in Zagreb, Croatia, revisited the issue. The event, supported by the Indian Council for Cultural Relations, aimed to examine whether the Roma, dispersed across multiple countries, could be recognized as part of the Indian diaspora. Speakers at the conference emphasized the historical and cultural connections of the Roma to India and highlighted the community’s desire for recognition, while also noting the complexities arising from centuries of displacement and marginalization. The conference underscored the ongoing need to consider formal recognition, though no official status was conferred by India still.

In a 2007 paper made by Ian Hancock, a Romani scholar, argues that the Romani people's Indian origin holds significant political weight beyond mere historical or academic interest. He contends that acknowledging this connection is essential for the "political legitimacy and security" of the Romani people. Hancock asserts that by establishing a verifiable historical and genetic link to a specific place of origin, the Romani people can counter the "fictitious history" often imposed on them by non-Romani individuals. This would allow them to take control of their own narrative and assert their identity. Furthermore, this Indian connection provides a basis for seeking support from the Indian government, which has been instrumental in acknowledging them symbolically as an Indian population outside of India. This recognition provides backing for the Romani leaders in their struggle for rights and representation in international forums like the United Nations, thereby enhancing their political standing and providing a measure of security on the global stage.

== See also ==
- Roma Route
- List of Romani people
- List of Romani settlements
- History of the Romani people
- South Asian diaspora
