= Kalderash =

Subgroup of the Romani people

The Kalderash are a subgroup of the Romani people. They were traditionally coppersmiths and metal workers and speak a number of Romani dialects grouped together under the term Kalderash Romani, a sub-group of Vlax Romani.

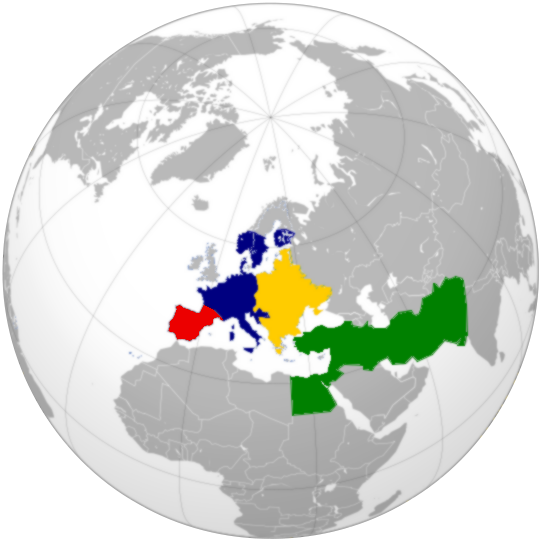
The three main confederations of Romani people in Europe, Kalderash (yellow), Sinti/Manush (blue), Gitanos (red), as well as the Dom people of the Middle East (green)

The Kalderash of the Balkans and Central Europe, in addition to the Gitanos and Manouche/Sinti, are seen as one of the three main confederations (Romani: natsiya) of Romani people in Europe by certain ethnographers. The Kalderash are recognized as the most numerous confederation of the three. Each main confederation is further split up into two or more subgroups (Romani: vitsa) based on a combination of factors such as occupation, ancestry, or territorial origin. Although originally referring to a specific vitsa of traditional coppersmiths, the name Kalderash is now applied to several Vlax-Speaking Roma groups. Because of this, significant differences in speech and culture can be seen in Western and Eastern Kalderash populations; as evidenced in the differences between the eastern Kalderash of Russia and the western Kalderash of Serbia. Certain scholars have suggested a connection between occupational Romani subgroups and the Caste System of India; with the Kalderash being described as an ancestral stock of the Lohar caste.

== Etymology ==
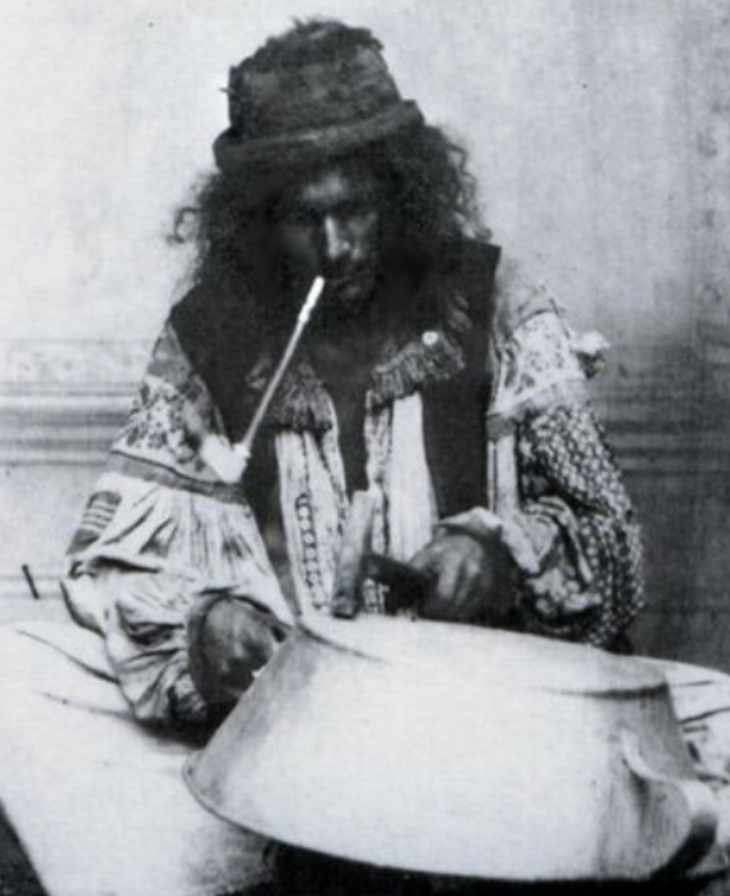
A traditional Kalderash Roma metalsmith from Hungary in 1892

The name Kalderash (kalderash in Romani, căldărari in Romanian, kalderás in Hungarian, калдараш (kaldarash) in Bulgarian, kalderaš in Serbo-Croatian, котляри (Kotlyary) in Ukrainian, and кэлдэрары (kelderary) in Russian) is an occupational ethnonym which descends ultimately from the Romanian word căldăraș (coppersmith) derived from Latin caldāria, in effect describing their trade as tinkers.

== Distribution ==
=== Romania ===
Eight-spoked wheel flag used by the Kalderash Roma of Călărași County

The Kalderash Roma are hypothesized to originate in the territory of modern-day Romania and to have migrated to different parts of the world following the abolition of Slavery in Romania in the late 1800s in a phenomenon known as the great Kalderash migration. There are estimated to be about 200,000 Căldărari still living in Romania, although the exact number is unknown. The region of Dobruja is a major center of Kalderash settlement, as well as, Wallachia and the Romanian-Bulgarian border regions. Bilingualism of Kalderash Romani and Romanian is prevalent among the Kalderash of Romania. Traditional societal traits of the Kalderash of Romania include endogamy, cross-cousin marriage, and customary courts known as Kris in Southern Transylvania and Wallachia. As revealed by their traditional ethnonym of Căldărari, the Kalderash are associated with a tradition of artisans especially that of copper and tin smithing. The head of Kalderash communities in Romania is associated with a chief known as a Bulibasha that has varying degrees of authority based on their locality. The Kalderash of Romania are further broken down into many different subgroups(vitsi) such as the Pletoshi (Kalaydzii) and Chori (Grebenari, Pieptenari) in Northern Dobruja, as well as in Militari, Tasmanari and Zhaplesh, in Southern Dobruja. Intra-ethnic marriages have united various subgroups such as Grastari, Niculešti, Dudulani, Tasmanari, Žapleš, Lajneš, Njamcurja under a common Kalderash identity.

=== Bulgaria ===
The Kalderash are one of the 5 main Romani subgroups living in Bulgaria along with the Daskane Roma, Horahane Roma, Kalaydji, and Boyash. During the 18th and especially during the 19th centuries following the abolition of Slavery in Romania, Roma from the Romanian principalities of Wallachia and Moldavia entered the Bulgarian territory in an event coined by certain ethnographers as the "Kalderash Invasion." In addition, a large part of the Kalderash migrated from Romania to Bulgaria through the Austro-Hungarian Empire passing through Serbia before finally reaching Bulgaria. The Kalderash are the second largest Romani confederation in Bulgaria and are split up into 2 main subgroups: the Lovari and Kalaydji, as well as, further branches within these subgroups such as "Grebenari", "Bakarjii", "Reshetari", etc. The Kalderash of Bulgaria mostly practice Eastern Orthodox Christianity and are bilingual in Kalderash Romani and Bulgarian. The customary courts of the Bulgarian Kalderash are known as the meshere.

=== Serbia and Bosnia ===
The Chergashe Roma are a primarily Kalderash subgroup living mostly in Serbia and Bosnia and Herzegovina. During the late 19th century, large migrations of the former Kalderash slaves of Romania to the neighboring countries of Serbia and then Bosnia occurred. They speak Kalderash Romani and are mostly concentrated around Banja Luca and Sarajevo. Since the dissolution of Yugoslavia, many Serbian and Bosnian Kalderash have immigrated to the United Kingdom to escape the economic and social oppression that Balkan Roma face in their home countries.

=== Russia and Ukraine ===
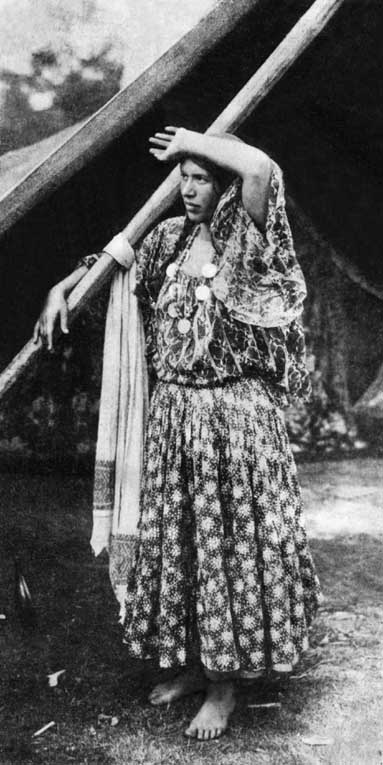
A Kalderash woman from a camp that stopped in Moscow, 1925

The Kalderash Roma are one of the most populous Romani groups in Russia following the Ruska Roma. The Kalderash migrated from the territory of the Romanian principalities and other parts of Southeast Europe to Russia and Ukraine between the end of the 19th and the first 30 years of the 20th century following the abolition of Slavery in Romania. They spread throughout Ukraine and Russia migrating from Bessarabia to the north and east. They soon became a relatively numerous group in Russia and their traditional occupations of tinning and cauldron making led them to initial prosperity. At the end of the 1920s and the beginning of the 1930s, the state took on a policy of industrialization that aimed at bringing a settled way of life to the nomadic Kalderash Roma. This resulted in the Kalderash becoming actively involved in cooperatives and establishing their own Romani production cooperatives called artels. These industrial artels helped the Kalderash successfully adapt their traditional craft to the new economic reality of the Soviet Union. The artels lasted until the 1980s and became a vibrant part of the oral history of the Kalderash families. During the artel period, most Kalderash camps were located in Moscow, however, after the dissolution of the artels, the Kalderash migrated all over Russia and other parts of Northern Europe. The Kalderash of Russia are mostly bilingual in Kalderash Romani and Russian.

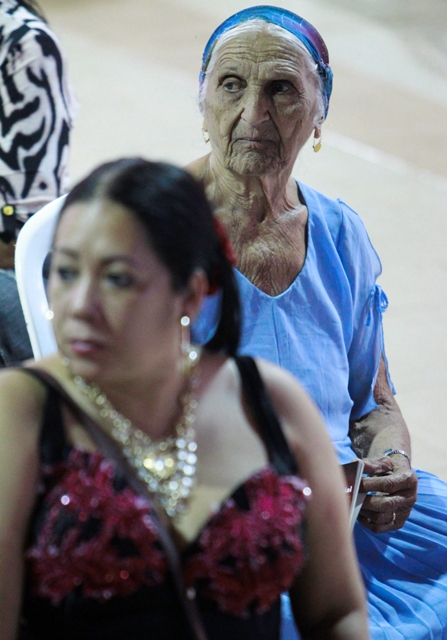
An elderly woman of the Kalderash Roma ethnicity in diaspora

=== France ===
In France, the Kalderash Roma are concentrated in the eastern suburbs of Paris. It is estimated that they have been gradually settling there since at least the 1940s. Montreuil is a town in the fringe of Paris with the largest Kalderash settlement in France. The Kalderash of Montreuil first arrived in France in 1941 following the German occupation of Paris. They still practice their traditional trade as coppersmiths and metal workers. Some Kalderash still travel around the French provinces although most are now sedentary. Despite frequent contact with non-Roma throughout their daily lives and economic activity, the Kalderash have managed to keep a degree of invisibility within French society that allows them to practice their traditional culture without fear of assimilation. In 2005, there was estimated to be about 8,000 Kalderash Roma living in France.

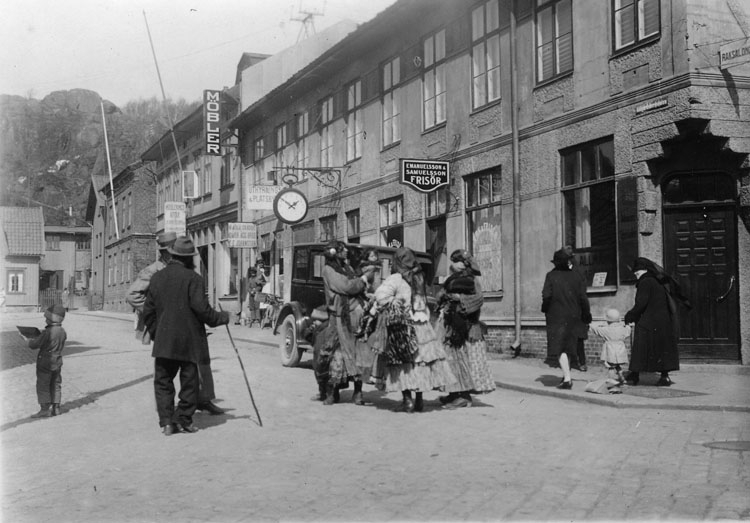
Kalderash Roma family in Sweden, early 20th century

=== Sweden ===
The Kalderash form one of the largest Romani communities in Sweden. During the late 19th and early 20th century, many Kalderash Roma from Russia migrated to Sweden. The Kalderash were the first and most numerous foreign Romani group to migrate and settle in the country. The most common occupations of the Kalderash of Sweden were tinning and coppersmithing. One of the most prominent Kalderash clans of Sweden were the Taikon. Johan Taikon was a highly skilled copper and silversmith who would make elaborate metal craft at night in the makeshift workshops of the camps, primarily for use within the Swedish Roma community. He also derived part of his income from mending and tinning copper pots all over Sweden, which gave him brief and momentary access to the exclusionary Swedish society that was being shaped along the particular lines of Swedish national identity. Johan Taikon's daughter, Rosa Taikon, was the first Roma silversmith in Sweden, who pursued a formal jewellery education. Katarina Taikon, also a daughter of Johan Taikon, was a prominent Romani activist and leader in the civil rights movement. The dialect of Kalderash Romani spoken in Sweden is commonly referred to as Taikon Kalderash.

=== United States ===
The Kalderash are the largest subgroup of Romani people and comprise a majority of the urban Roma population in the United States. The Kalderash are generally less wealthy than other Roma groups in the U.S. such as the Machwaya. However, there is considerable variability in the status of the various Kalderash subgroups (Romani: vitsi) in terms of wealth and prosperity. Certain wealthy Kalderash vitsi in the U.S. have been able to achieve a higher level of wealth and consider themselves to be cleaner than lower class Kalderash vitsi. Unlike the more nationalistic Kalderash in Eastern Europe, American Kalderash are reluctant to take up any public political roles or bring attention to themselves; benefiting off of the relative invisibility they experience in the west. According to studies done on the Kalderash clans of Seattle, Kalderash Roma generally stick to traditional itinerant jobs such as automobile body repair, roofing, stove cleaning, and other short term jobs that allows them to maintain their traditional lifestyle. The Kalderash are one of the more traditional groups of Roma and have resisted Americanization more rigorously than other Roma subgroups such as the Sinti.

== Culture ==
=== Folklore ===
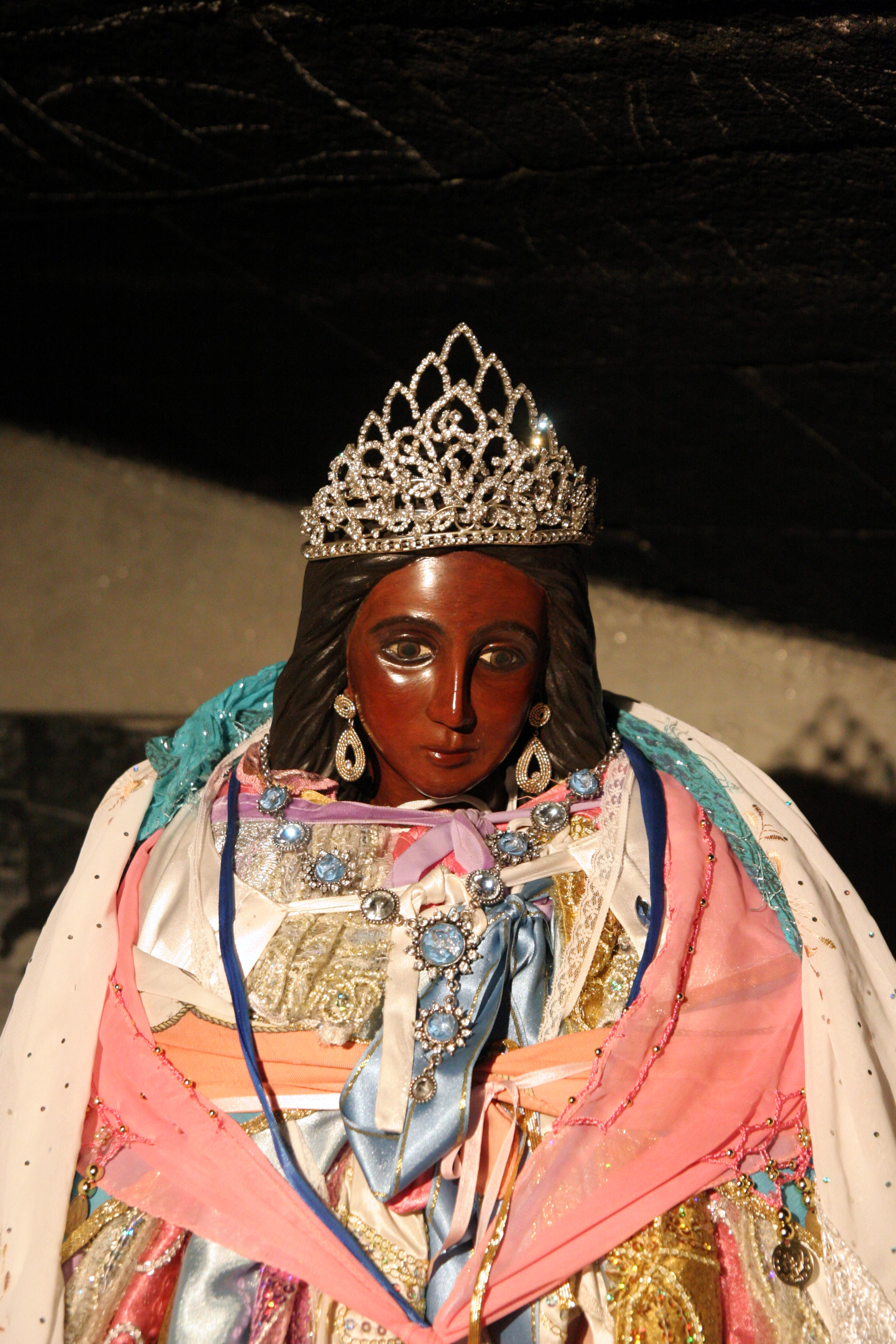
The shrine of Kali Sara

Saint Sarah, commonly known as Kali Sara among the Vlax Roma, is an important saint in the traditional religion of the Kalderash. The traditional Kalderash Roma religion involves a syncretism of Shaktism and Christianity. Kali Sara comes from the Hindu Goddess Kali and became a saint as a way for Roma to practice their religion without fear of persecution. Many traditional Roma still pray to God through Kali Sara in the Shakta tradition. During communist times, many Balkan Kalderash were barred from attending the sacred pilgrimage of Kali Sara, known to them as santana, that occurs in Southern France each year during May. Now, the Kalderash Roma of Canada, Latin America, and the Balkans all have their own traditions on how they venerate the saint Kali Sara.

Mam'orry is a human like mythological character that almost always appears in Kalderash folklore as an old woman. She fulfills certain character forming activities based on Romani law and society such as visiting a person in order to ask for some water. This is related to the prohibition of lack of water in a tent or at a house at night in Romani law. The absence of water, "dryness", has negative connotations in Romani culture. After having visited the house this character can also vomit out some "pulp" which usually turns to be a luck bringing blessing by Mam'orry. This "pulp" could be used as a basis for a "mascot" which brings luck and happiness to its possessor.

== Religion ==
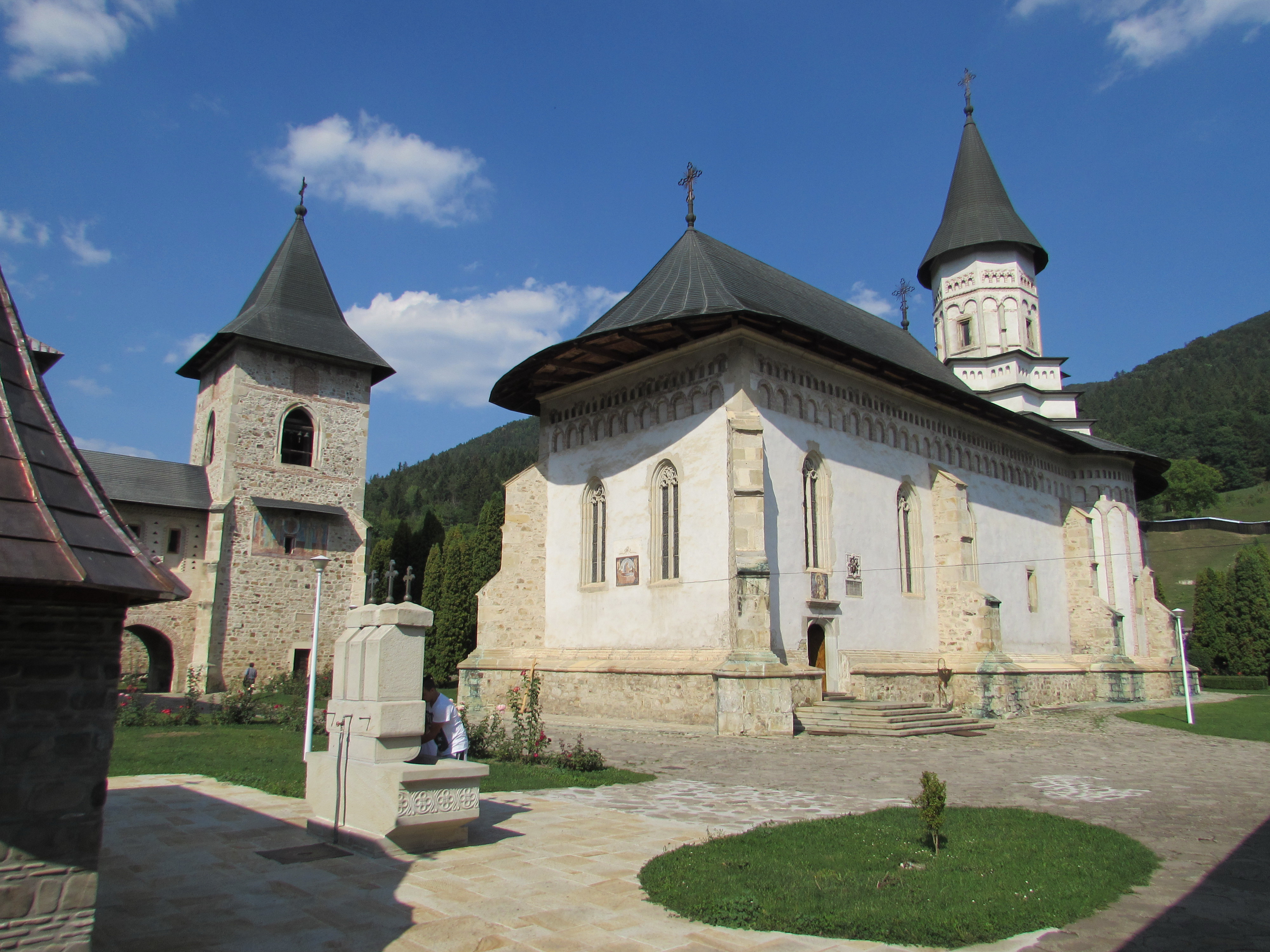
Bistrița Monastery; considered a Holy place among Eastern Orthodox Kalderash Roma

The majority of Kalderash Roma follow Christianity, practicing the Eastern Orthodox, Roman Catholic, or Pentecostal denominations. Historically the Kalderash have followed the majority religion of their host country such as Eastern Orthodoxy in Romania and Roman Catholicism in Hungary. However, there has been a rising Pentecostal movement among Kalderash Roma of all countries since at least the 20th century.

== Notable Kalderash ==
- Ronald Lee, Canadian writer
- Matéo Maximoff, Romani-French writer
- Florin Cioabă, Romanian Romani activist, Pentecostal minister, and self-proclaimed "King of Roma Everywhere."
- Anton Pann, Romanian writer, musician (of the Wallachia region); theorized to have had a Romani father of the Căldărari clan by Romani and certain non-Romani sources.
- Katarina Taikon, Swedish Romani activist and author of books for children
- Rosa Taikon, sister of Katarina, Swedish Romani jeweller

== See also ==
- Lovari
- Romani Holocaust
