= Vlax Romani language =

Romani dialect group of southeastern Europe

Vlax Romani
- romani shib
- Native to: Bosnia, Romania, Serbia, Albania, Hungary, Israel; scattered in numerous other states
- Native speakers: 538,480 (2002–2014)
- Language family: Indo-European: Indo-Iranian; Indo-Aryan; Western Zone; Romani; Vlax Romani

Official status
- Recognised minority language in: Hungary, Romania, Poland, and Serbia

Language codes
- ISO 639-3: rmy
- Glottolog: vlax1238
- ELP: Vlax Romani

Vlax Romani varieties are spoken mainly in Southeastern Europe by the Romani people. Vlax Romani can also be referred to as an independent language or as one dialect of the Romani language. Vlax Romani is the second most widely spoken dialect subgroup of the Romani language worldwide, after Balkan Romani.

== Name ==
The language's name Vlax Romani was coined by British scholar Bernard Gilliat-Smith in his 1915 study on Bulgarian Romani, in which he first divided Romani dialects into Vlach and non-Vlach. The Vlax Roma, a subgroup of the Romani people that speak the Vlax Romani language, originate from the former Roma slaves in the principalities of Moldavia and Wallachia (with the name "Vlax", which comes from "Vlach", coming from the latter), now Romania.

The words Romani and Romania are false cognates, the former deriving from Romani rom – ultimately from Sanskrit word ḍoma/डोम, and the latter deriving from Romanian român – ultimately from Latin.

== Classification ==
Vlax Romani is classified in two groups: Vlax I, or Northern Vlax (including Kalderash and Lovari), and Vlax II, or Southern Vlax.

Elšík uses this classification and dialect examples (geographical information from Matras):

Sub-group	Dialect	Place
Ukrainian Vlax	-	Ukraine
Northern Vlax	Cerhari	Hungary
	Hungarian Lovari	Hungary
	Hungarian Lovari	Slovakia
	Austrian Lovari	Austria
	Polish Lovari	Poland
	Norwegian Lovari	Norway
	Serbian Kalderaš	Serbia
	Italian Kalderaš	Italy
	Russian Kalderaš	Russia
	Taikon Kalderaš	Sweden
	American Vlax	USA
Southern Vlax	Vallachian	Romania
	Ihtiman	Bulgaria (named after the city)
	Gurbet	Serbia and Bosnia Gurbeti
	Korça	Albania (named after the city)
	Italian Xoraxane	Italy (Xoraxane translates as "Muslims" in the dialect)
	Ajia Varvara	Greece (named after a suburb of Athens)

== Writing systems ==
Vlax Romani is written using the Romani orthography, predominantly using the Latin alphabet with several additional characters. In the area of the former Soviet Union, however, it can also be written in the Cyrillic script.
