= Lovari =

Subgroup of the Romani people

Regions with significant populations
- Romania, Hungary, Ukraine, Poland, Slovakia, Czechia, Germany, Croatia, Serbia

Languages
- Vlax Romani

Religion
- Christianity (predominately Catholicism and Orthodox Christianity)

Related ethnic groups
- Other Romani peoples

Lovari ("horse-dealer", from Hungarian "ló", horse) is a subgroup of the Romani people, who speak their own dialect, influenced by Hungarian and West Slavic dialects. They live predominantly throughout Central Europe (Hungary, Poland, Slovakia, the Czech Republic, and Germany) as well as in Southeastern Europe (Romania, Croatia, and northern Serbia).

== Ethnology ==
The Lovari are a Romani people who speak a dialect influenced by Hungarian and West Slavic dialects. Their language is classified under Vlax Romani. The Lovari are further divided into the Machvaya, named after the Mačva region, which they settled from modern day Hungary.

== See also ==
- Kalderash
- Ruska Roma

== Bibliography ==
- Yoors Jan. The Gypsies. New York. 1983. ISBN 9780671493356
