= Boyash =

Romani subgroup

Total population
- ≈ 14,000

Boyash or Bayash (endonym: Bȯjáṡ, Romanian: Băieși, Hungarian: Beás, Slovak: Bojáš, Serbo-Croatian: Banjaši, Bojaši) are a Romani ethnic group living in Romania, Moldova, southern Hungary, northern Croatia, northern Serbia, Slovakia, the Balkans, but also in the Americas. Alternative names are Rudari (Ludari), Lingurari and Zlătari.

== History ==
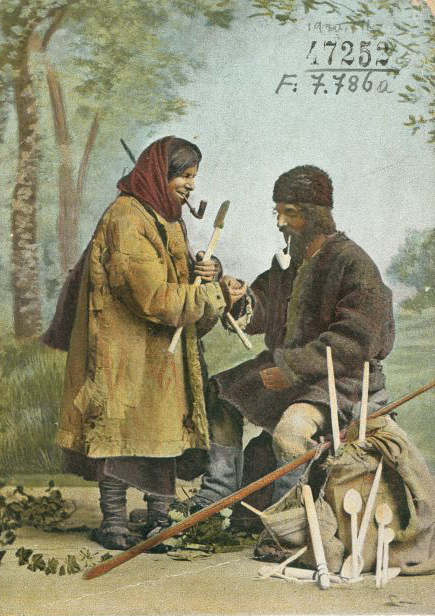
Lingurari (wood "spoon-makers") from Transilvania

The Boyash or Băieși (in Romanian) are a branch/caste of the Roma who were forced to settle in the 14th century in the Apuseni Mountains, located in Transylvania, and work as slaves in mining (a regionalism for mine in Romanian: "baie," from Middle Age Slavonic).

At the end of the 16th century the Boyash started migrating towards the south, in Wallachia, and the east, in Moldavia, where they were held as slaves together with other Romani groups (until the slavery was abolished in 1855–56).

Another name for the Boyash, Rudari, comes from the Slavic ruda ("metal", "ore"). As the mines became inefficient, the Boyash people were forced to readjust by earning their living making wood utensils (Lingurari means "spoon-makers" in Romanian; also cf. Serbian ruda, Hungarian rúd, Romanian rudă meaning "relative", but also "rod, pole, stick"). The nickname Kashtale ("wood-workers") was also given to them by the Romani-speaking Roma and it has remained in Romani as a more general word for a Rom who does not speak Romani. After the point at which they began to make wood tools they scattered themselves in isolated communities. The consequence of this is that nowadays they speak a distinct archaic dialect of Romanian, with borrowings from other surrounding languages.

== Population ==
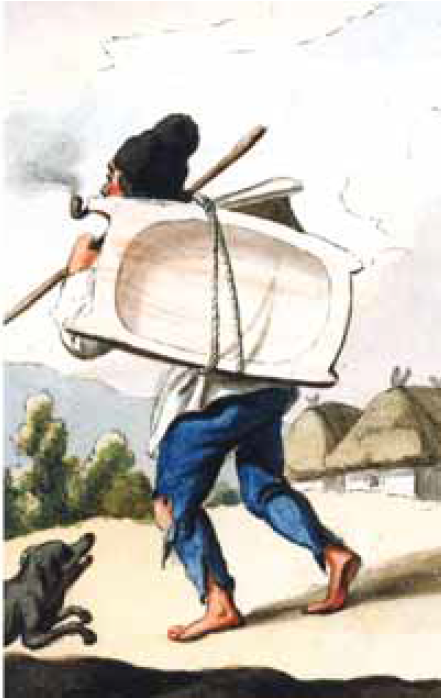
A Bayach carries dough troughs for sale

After the liberation of the Roma from slavery (by the middle of the 19th century), many emigrated to other countries, especially Hungary and the Balkans, but also as far as the Americas, South Africa and Australia.

In 1993, about 14,000 of the 280,000 recorded Hungarian Roma were Boyash.

In Croatia, the Boyash are settled in several small communities along the Hungarian border in the regions of Međimurje, the Podravina, Slavonija and Baranja with an overflow of settlers living in the Apatin county of Vojvodina, Serbia. 2005 saw the Boyash language of Croatia published in its own alphabet for the first time in the Catholic Catechism, published by the HBK Glas Koncila in Zagreb. In 2007, the first Bible—a children's Bible—was published by OM EAST in Austria and facilitated by The Romani Bible Union.

=== Names in other languages ===
In English, the commonly accepted name for the ethnic group is Boyash, however in contemporary Bulgaria the terms Ludari and Rudari are in common use, while in Romania both terms are present in some form: Rudari and Băieși.

For the same ethnic group in Hungary and Croatia the terms Beyash and Bayash (Bajaši) are now officially used. The ethnonym Banyash ("miner") in Serbia is known only among the group settled in Bačka region, living along the river Danube, near the border with Croatia and Hungary. This term is only sporadically understood, and not used among some other Banyash groups in the Serbian Banat region, e.g. the village of Uljma.

They are also known by many appellations based on trades; in addition to Rudari/Ludari ("miners", from Serbian and Bulgarian ruda "ore, metal") they are known as Kopanari ("cradle-makers", from Serbian and Bulgarian kopanja "wooden box"), Koritari ("trough-makers"), Lingurara ("spoon-makers", cf. Romanian lingură "spoon") and Ursari (cf. Romanian urs "bear") or Mechkara ("bear-trainers").

== Education ==
Education in the Romanian language is available only for the Banyash living in Romanian villages in the Serbian Banat, as well as in Hungary, in the subdialect of the Romanian language spoken by Boyash communities in (central and western) Hungary.

During the last few years there have been several attempts on behalf of local non-governmental organizations in East Bačka region to introduce optional classes in Romanian. According to 2004 field research data, only two such projects are still going on there: optional classes in Romanian in the village of Vajska, and kindergarten in the local Ardeal dialect in Bački Monoštor, attended by 20 pupils altogether.
