= Shishkin =

Shishkin (Russian: Шишкин) is a Russian masculine surname. Its feminine counterpart is Shishkina. The surname is derived from the sobriquet шишка/shishka ('pinecone'), or from Turkish: şiş ('to swell'). Notable people with the surname include:

- Aleksey Shishkin, Russian Gypsy arranger and composer
- Aleksandr Shishkin (born 1966), Russian football player
- Alla Shishkina (born 1989), Russian competitor in synchronized swimming
- Boris Schischkin (1886–1963), Russian botanist
- Dasha Shishkin (born 1977), Russian-American artist
- Dmitry Shishkin (born 1992), Russian pianist
- Georgy Shishkin (born 1948), Russian painter
- Ivan Shishkin (1832–1898), Russian painter
- Mikhail Shishkin (writer) (born 1961), Russian writer
- Mikhail Shishkin (footballer) (born 1980), Russian association football player
- Nikolai Shishkin (1845-1911), Russian gypsy singer-arranger-composer from Kursk
- Oleg Șișchin (born 1975), Moldovan footballer
- Olga Shishkina (musician) (born 1985), Russian-born musician
- Olga Shishkina (physicist), Russian physicist
- Pavel Shishkin (born 1970), Russian businessman
- Roman Shishkin (born 1987), Russian footballer
- Sergey Shishkin (born 1973), Russian footballer
- Svetlana Malahova-Shishkina (born 1977), Kazakhstani cross-country skier
- Tatyana Shishkina (born 1969), Kazakhstani judoka
- Vadim Shishkin (born 1969), Ukrainian chess grandmaster
- Viktor Shishkin (born 1955), Russian footballer
- Vladimir Shishkin (hurdler) (born 1964), Russian hurdler
- Vladimir Shishkin (boxer) (born 1991), Russian boxer
- Vyacheslav Shishkin (born 1993), Russian footballer
- Yuri Shishkin (born 1963), Russian footballer

== See also ==
- Shishkin (horse)
- List of minor planets: 3001–4000 (3558)
