= Polska Roma =

Group of the Romani people

Languages
- Baltic Romani

Religion
- Roman Catholicism

Related ethnic groups
- Belaruska Roma, Ruska Roma, Sinti

Polska Roma are the largest and one of the oldest ethnolinguistic groups of Romani people living in Poland. Many Polska Roma also reside in Germany, North America, Switzerland, Great Britain and Sweden. Some can also be found in Lithuania, Belarus, and Russia. The term “Polska Roma” is both an ethnonym of the group and a term used in the scholarly literature. of the group and a term used in scholarly literature. As such, it differs from the term “Polish Roma,” which in a broader sense refers to the entire Roma population in Poland. Therefore, the term “Polska Roma” or “Sasytka Roma” (Gypsie) is used exclusively for this specific group, while the term “Polish Roma” is applied to all Roma groups living in Poland — the broader Roma population in Poland. The Polska and Sasytka Roma are often referred to as Sinti, or it is claimed that they are a branch that split off from the German Sinti.

== Culture ==
Migration Overview Roma

The Polska Roma remained semi-nomadic until the 20th century, traveling only seasonally. There were also settled Polska Roma. They did not assimilate into the broader Polish society or the non-Romani cultures of other countries where they live. In fact, they are one of the most traditional Romani groups. An exception to this is that the most common surnames among the Polska Roma are typically Polish (e.g., Kwiatkowski or Majewski), or occasionally Polonized German names (e.g., Wajs or Szwarc) and Polonized Lithuanian names (e.g., Markiewicz or Karolowicz). The Polska Roma have maintained a very strict interpretation of the Romanipen cultural laws and practices. They are, in fact, considered the "Orthodox Roma", as they have numerous and diverse practices that they call the Romano Kodex. However, some cultural differences arose within the community during and after World War II. Those Polska Roma who spent the war in Soviet-controlled territories were able to maintain their orthodox practices, while those under German occupation, threatened by genocide, had to compromise the strictness of their traditions to survive.

In the 16th century, when the mass migration of the Roma fled persecution in the Holy Roman Empire, they called themselves Sasytka Roma (which means "Old German Roma"; the name Sasytka itself is derived from Saxony, Saso, Secanos). In western Poland, around the 17th century, they adopted the name Polska Roma, as they no longer identified as German Roma but accepted the Polish-Lithuanian Commonwealth as their homeland. Nevertheless, many still call themselves Sasytka Roma today. Another name for the Sasytka Roma is "Pluniaki", as they still speak the old accent and loved the color red. They were mainly active throughout Prussia and the Baltic regions. Today, the Sasytka Roma are a subgroup of the Polska Roma and have remained the tribal leaders of the Polska Roma for generations.

There are other subgroups of the Polska Roma:

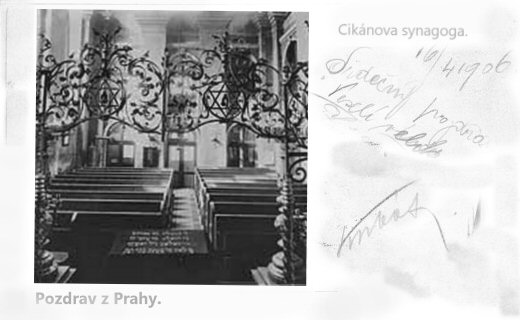
Gypsy Synagogue

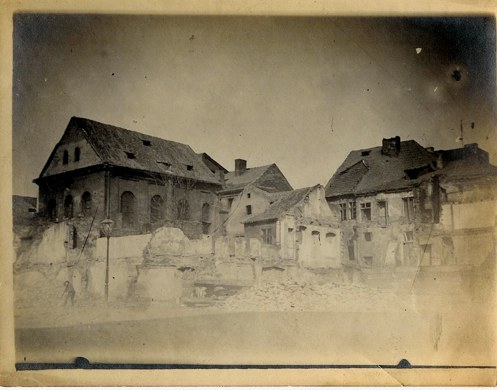
Gypsy Synagogue

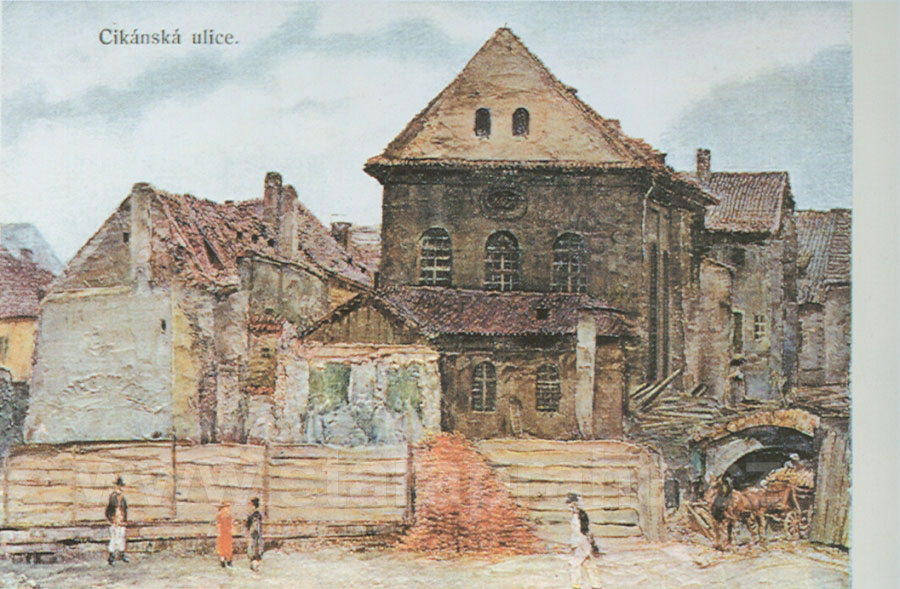
Gypsy Synagogue in Prague

The Rapaci originate from the region of Bohemian Silesia, also called "Opole", which is now part of Poland. The name Rapaci comes from “Karpaci - Carpathians”. They were first mentioned in 1357 in southwestern Poland and again in 1401 and further mentions. In Bohemian Silesia, they were first mentioned in 1350. Their surnames were "Cygan". A mass migration from Bohemia began when the persecution in the Holy Roman Empire and in Bohemia spread in the 16th century, leading them to emigrate to Poland. Some remained in Bohemia and built a synagogue in 1611 under Salomon Salkid-Cygan. This is the only Roma synagogue that is still documented, although it was repeatedly destroyed and rebuilt. In 1906, the synagogue was closed, and a new one, the Jerusalem Synagogue in Prague, was built.

The Leśaki lived in forests and traveled only in forests.

The Berniki, also called Bare Forytka, were later partly referred to as Śleciaki, as they are Warsaw Roma.

The Omśniaki come from Łomża, near Warsaw.

The Marcinki came from all over Prussia.

The Bosaki were known for always going barefoot (boso - barefoot in Polish).

The Ćejaki were a priestly caste and harp makers from Lithuania and East Prussia, but became extinct during World War II.

The Kaliszaki come from Kalisz.

The Jaglany were so named because they always ate millet porridge (kasza jaglana in Polish).

The Wengerki came from Austria.

The Warmiaki came from Kaliningrad and Warmia.

The Heladytka originate from the Baltic countries, as well as Belarus and Russia, and are also called Ruska Roma.

The western Polska Roma came from Pomerania and West Prussia.

However, there are additional new subgroups that have emerged from intermarriages with other Roma tribes in the 20th and 21st centuries. Due to the displacement of the Polska Roma, new subgroups have formed that are now at the lower end of the hierarchy. They do not belong to the original Sasytka Roma who came from the Holy Roman Empire. Through intermarriages with Bergitka Roma, Lovara, Kalderash, and Sinti, the following new subgroups of the Polska Roma have emerged: Galicjaki, Siwaki, Pachowiaki, Puhary, Toniki, and Serwy. These subgroups hold a lower status within the Polska Roma society, but some groups tolerate them more, such as the Ruska Roma living in Poland.

The Polska Roma are closely related to Ruska Roma, as well as to the Baltic Roma, who all speak the Baltic Romani dialects. This is the northeastern branch; they are descendants of the Polska Roma who have split over time, forming new tribes and groups. All the living Ruska Roma, Lotvitka Roma, Estonska Roma, Litovska Roma, and Bjaleruska Roma in Poland belong to the Polska Roma tribe. After these divisions, various tribes emerged, each with its own groups and subgroups: in Russia, the Ruska Roma; in the Baltic regions, the Litovska Roma, Lotvitka Roma, and Estonska Roma. In these areas, they were all influenced by Ruthenian culture. As the Heladytka settled in Western Russia in the 17th century, they were more influenced by Ruthenian culture than by Polish culture. However, the Roma who remained in Poland were not strongly influenced, despite their contact to the countries countries.

In Poland, under the partitions, the Roma in the Russian-occupied areas were treated relatively well, and the majority of the community emigrated there. By the mid-19th century, there was a significant decline in the Roma population in Poland: most gradually moved to Russia. Many Roma also left Lithuania; in 1840, only 70 Roma families were registered in Lithuania. The Roma who came to the Polish-Lithuanian Commonwealth from Germany mostly continued to migrate to Russia, and those who remained eventually migrated to Russia as well. In the Polish-Lithuanian Commonwealth, the Roma primarily moved to the Duchy of Lithuania rather than under the Crown, as they were better received in the northeast and enjoyed more privileges there. Initially, small individual families from Germany (1501) and Bohemia (1357) had no issues in the Polish-Lithuanian Commonwealth, but this changed when persecution in Germany began. In the 16th century, Roma mass-migrated from Germany. Today, the remaining Polska Roma in Poland are very few compared to the many Ruska Roma who have settled in Russia. Even fewer are those in the Baltic regions.

The Polska Roma Kings (Siero Rom Formerly called "Hetman"), belong to the subgroup Sasytka Roma ("Pluniaki").

Henryk Nudziu Kozłowski (died April 2, 2021)– activist of the Roma community in Poland. He served as Siero Roma of the Polish Lowland Gypsies. He was the founder of the Royal Roma Foundation His successor was his son, C. Kozłowski.

== History ==
=== Origin ===
The first appearance of the Roma in the Holy Roman Empire was probably in 1407 or 1417. In 1407, it is not entirely clear as they were referred to as Tatars but did not introduce themselves. In 1417, a small group arrived as pilgrims to do penance for seven years; they called themselves Secanos. After the seven years, they disappeared again, presumably heading northeast, likely towards Pomerania. In 1426, a large group appeared, comprising thousands of people. They carried letters of protection and were led by a king, three dukes, a count, as well as slaves and knights. They all came from Hungary. Later, the group led by Duke Panuel and Count Jon reached the Polish-Lithuanian Commonwealth via Bohemia and what was then Germany. King Zyndlon traveled to Austria, then to Bohemia, and finally to the Polish-Lithuanian Commonwealth. Dukes Andrash and Mihali traveled to Zurich in Switzerland. Duke Andrash continued the journey towards Italy.

The German Reichstag ordered a general expulsion of the Roma from the country, which took place in 1577. The police reports on this matter disappeared, and silence followed. A large number of Roma moved to the Polish-Lithuanian Commonwealth, where the news of their persecution spread.

In Germany, at that time characterized by fanatical opinions, order, and a spirit of strictness, the Roma quickly adapted to a free life and soon provoked the anger of the Germans. Some private lords and certain princes strongly protected this people, following the example of Emperor Sigismund. However, after his death, some began to persecute them harshly, while others ceased to protect them. This led to an open project against the Roma, introduced at the Reichstag of the Holy Roman Empire in 1496 and 1497, which had serious consequences. It was only under the rule of Emperor Maximilian I. Harsh laws were renewed and implemented, starting in the year 1500. The injustice of these measures lay in the fact that the government empowered any citizen (German) to arbitrarily harm, punish, and torture the Roma if they were captured in the country.

However, there are no historical records indicating that the Roma were ever oppressed in the Grand Duchy of Lithuania. The privileges granted by King Alexander confirm that they had long held leaders and kings, called Voivodes and Hetmans, who were elected by them and confirmed by the Lithuanian and Polish monarchs. They enjoyed freedom and government protection. Such privileges were regularly recorded in the documents of the counties where they primarily lived. Similarly, in the Crown, such leaders were elected, called tribal chiefs, who governed all the Roma of the entire Polish-Lithuanian Commonwealth and had other leaders under them who led individual groups or families.

Each Tabor had its own Voivode (Duke - Polish "Hrabia"), but the Hetman (King - proverb "Syndlostro Dziacipen" goes back to King Syndlon), was the tribal chief over all the Tabors. These tribal chiefs were always from the same family, inheriting their position from father to son or from father to nephew. However, a grandson could also take the position if neither a son nor a nephew met the requirements to assume the role. Throughout the Polish-Lithuanian Commonwealth, such Voivodes of the Tabors lived, including in villages, where they did not travel with the Tabors but led a settled life. Likewise, the family of the tribal chief was not limited to the Crown alone but was active across the entire Commonwealth, both as travelers and as settlers. The Polish nobility had no interest in tormenting the weak, defenseless, and humble people. Wealthy landowners, who possessed vast tracts of land, were wary of reducing the population and even supported the settlement of the destitute. However, Romani settlements did not exist in Poland. German bands, scattered throughout the country, posed a threat of unrest, and the established residents began to perceive their presence as a deception. For this reason, in 1678, a decree was issued that, following the final confirmation of the expulsion in Germany, effectively declared the Roma as outcasts. Furthermore, it was determined that anyone who supported them would be considered an accomplice to their crimes and would also be banished.

At that time, the Roma were not considered vagabonds, but rather "as part of the national mosaic, not as foreign patterns." In medieval Europe, numerous laws and edicts were issued to expel the Roma or forcibly assimilate them in various countries. In 1471, the first anti-Gypsy law was introduced in Lucerne (Switzerland). Regulations appeared in Brandenburg (1482) and Spain (1492). Emperor Maximilian I issued a series of decrees (e.g., in the years 1496, 1497, 1498, 1500, and others) that forced the Roma to leave the territory of what was then Germany. City and regional archives mention people referred to as "Cygan" (originally "Czigan").

They often held the highest positions in agricultural and household services in the Polish-Lithuanian Commonwealth and the Grand Duchy of Lithuania. As previously mentioned, the first Roma to arrive in Poland via Bohemia were the Rapaci and Sasytka Roma from the Holy Roman Empire. These two Roma groups consisted of only two families from the years 1501 (Wasyl Duke, Polgar Duke) and 1357 (Mikolaj Cygan). This situation changed irrevocably in the next century, the 16th century, thanks to the Roma who came from the lands of the Holy Roman Empire, specifically from Germany, as refugees. This mass migration was not a random journey; it was already known that the Commonwealth offered very favorable privileges and freedom of movement, as the first groups had already established themselves in the Commonwealth and thoroughly scouted the land. The mass migration was therefore very well targeted at the intended destination.

The Polish Roma communities are more closed-off and mistrustful of outsiders (Gadje), less "assimilated", and more closely connected to the traditional Romanipen culture. Their Romani dialect has also absorbed many German words and expressions that entered Poland through Germany. Regarding migration patterns, it is worth noting that reports of Roma in southern Poland, where their presence was already noticeable in the 14th century, have emerged. This contrasts with what could be observed in Western Europe, as it was a sedentary rather than a nomadic population. Polish sources do not mention pilgrims from Egypt or newcomers in the 15th century whose appearance and customs would have caused general astonishment. However, it is reported that they leased land, suggesting that the first Roma in Poland might have been wealthy individuals. They called themselves Cygan, at the time the word was not derogatory or negative. They were ordinary citizens and used this word as their surname. For them, a sedentary lifestyle was nothing new, and they were so assimilated that their differences were not recorded. The Roma ("Sasytka" later "Polska") who came from Germany also reached Lithuania and, from there, Latvia, Belarus, and Russia. The historical source that serves as the basis for this assumption is the privilege of free movement granted by Alexander Jagiellon, King of Poland (1501-1506) and Grand Duke of Lithuania (1492-1506). Linguistic research has also shown that the Roma from Lithuania, Latvia, and Russia use loanwords from Polish and German, which also supports the historical evidence of their migration route. Additionally, all these tribes speak the same identical dialect, the northeastern branch, which is also referred to as Baltic Romanes in linguistic research. The Roma use the word "tribes" and not "groups", as they refer to their subgroups as "groups", and the word "subgroup" is used for the specific subunit within a group. It went to Polish lands via Germany. It is a fact that large groups of Roma fled to Poland from Germany due to repression, but this happened only at the turn of the 15th and 16th centuries, during the time of Emperor Maximilian I, Emperor Wladislaus II Jagiellon (1496), Emperor Alexander I. Finally, in 1577, a large horde managed to reach Polish territory, scattered throughout the Polish-Lithuanian Commonwealth as far as Russia. They called themselves Egyptians from Egypt and Philistines from Minor Asia.

Roma migration overview '' Roma Foundation | Rromani Fundacija

=== In the Polish–Lithuanian Commonwealth ===
Between the 16th and 18th centuries, the Polish-Lithuanian Union, like other European states, enacted anti-Roma laws. However, unlike most European countries, these laws were rarely enforced on a large scale, because the Roma found powerful protectors among the Szlachta (Polish nobility) and were subject to benevolent neglect. Polish nobles, magnates, and large landowners valued the traditional crafts of the Roma, such as metallurgy, farming, and wheelwrighting, as well as their musical skills, which became an integral part of important events. Their primary occupation, horse trading, was also highly popular among the nobility. The Polska Roma were generally exempt from feudal restrictions, unlike the Polish peasants who were tied to the land. They enjoyed greater respect and privileges compared to other Roma groups, such as the Bergitka Roma, and the Polish peasants. They could continue their nomadic lifestyle for most of the year, as long as they arrived in their "hometown" on pre-determined market days. In this regard, the Polska Roma occupied a higher social status than the Polish peasants and other Roma populations, such as the Bergitka Roma (meaning "mountain gypsies"; this tribal designation was given to them by the Polska Roma in the 20th century, as they are still referred to as Labance today. They had no self-designation, but now call themselves Bergitka Roma or Galicjaki, and some simply Roma. They came from the Balkans to southern Poland and Ukraine, where their mobility was restricted).

In many large estates of the magnates latifundia the Polska Roma communities were also granted the right to have a "king", elected to represent them in disputes with outsiders. Even in the 18th century, Polish Roma repeatedly fled from German territories. The Exile Decree is an Austrian imperial edict from the early 18th century that recalls earlier regulations against vagrants, including the Roma. The second is a similar edict issued in Berlin in 1721 for the Kingdom of Prussia. These laws and the brutal anti-Roma policies of Austria and Prussia were among the reasons for the Roma's flight to Poland, where they are now known as the Polska Roma.

Additional anti-Roma laws were enacted in Poland and Lithuania when Augustus the Strong, Elector of Saxony, was elected King of Poland in 1697. Saxony, like most German states at that time, had very strict anti-Roma legislation (Roma men were to be killed on sight, often with a reward offered for their ears, while Roma women and children were disfigured, branded, and exiled). When Augustus took office, some of these laws were transferred to the Union. However, a distinction was made between the laws applicable in Augustus's home state of Saxony and those in the commonwealth itself, where the harshest measures were converted into fines or simply neglected by local authorities. Shortly before the Partitions of Poland, Polska Roma, like other non-Szlachta classes, were granted full citizenship by the Constitution of 3rd May. However, these privileges were lost with the partitions and the Polska Roma were forced back into servile status by the foreign powers (Austria, Prussia, Russia).

Nomination of Matias Karolowicz as the king of Gypsies in Poland

The need to establish a superior of the Roma - a nomadic people and therefore difficult to control - was one of the pressing problems faced by the modern rulers of Central Europe. Until the mid-17th century, in Poland there were only examples of confirmation of seniority among leaders selected by the Roma themselves, supported by local property owners or land officials. However, the oldest preserved document appointing a lifetime "office of seniority over all Gypsies who are and will be in the Crown and its adjacent countries", issued by King John II Casimir himself, dates back to 1652. The nominee was Matias Karolowicz, but nothing is known about him, except that he was not the first to hold his position. The document stated that Karolowicz was the successor of the already deceased Janczy, the previous superior of the Roma. According to the royal act, Karolowicz was endowed "according to custom (...) with all prerogatives, income and benefits", including judicial powers. As Janczy is currently the earliest known "royal" superior of the Gypsies, it is assumed that this institution must have been established during the reign of Władysław IV. There are circumstantial evidence that Janczy was the court bagpiper of this king. Ten years after Karolowicz's elevation, King John Casimir appointed another superior - Sebastian Gałęzowski, this time probably a nobleman. The next ones were also of noble origin. The first Gypsy king by title, or more precisely the head of the "Gypsy kingdom", was Łukasz Iwaszkiewicz in 1697, appointed by Augustus II the Strong. Not all royally appointed superiors ruled the entire community, as there were those who were granted only regional competences. The royal title was awarded until the third partition of the Polish-Lithuanian Commonwealth (the last one was Jakub Znamierowski, a landowner from Lida) - from then on, the king was chosen independently by individual Families (clans) of Polish Roma.

The chosen ones

The institution of Gypsy kings existed in Poland from the 16th to the 18th century and was reestablished in a different form after World War I. In the Polska Roma group, the king holds the title of Sero Rom (in the past, the term "Hetmano" was used, which means the same as "Sero Rom"). Gypsy kings (the correct term for the leader of a family, group, or national community) survived only in Poland. They mediate internal disputes and represent the community in dealings with local authorities. There are two different definitions of the institution of the Gypsy king. The first refers to a person recognized by the authorities of a particular country as the official head of the Roma community. The king was the official representative of the Roma to the authorities of a given country or territory. His role was to protect the interests of the Roma on one hand and to maintain order and collect taxes on the other. According to the second definition, the king is the leader of the Roma (not imposed from outside), the head of customs and traditions. This institution existed in Poland from the 14th century to the 21st century til today. There are various positions within this hierarchy. The highest position is the "Sero Rom", followed by the second position, the "Jongkary" (this position no longer exists todayas it is no longer necessary). Next is the elder of each subgroup, formerly called Vojwodo or subgroup leader. The head of the family is the "Phuro", "Phury" (an elder man or woman). There are some old writings that describe such "kings", "Hetmans", and family leaders throughout the Polish-Lithuanian Commonwealth, which can only be found in Poland today.

Below are some of these individuals described:

The chosen ones	Privilege
Thomas Polgar	1492
Wasyl	in 1501 century. The story goes that Alexander Jagiellończyk returned to Vienna in lieu of the "voivodeship of the Cyganes"
Janczy Karolewicz	
Matiasz Korolewicz	appointed Elder under the privilege of 1652, in the Crown and in Polish-Lithuanian Commonwealth.
Jan Nawrotyński	appointed Elder by charter of 1668, in the Crown and in Polish-Lithuanian Commonwealth.
Molski	presumably he received the privilege from Michał Korybut Wiśniowiecki
Stanisław Węgłowski	appointed by a privilege on July 10, 1682, granted in Jaworów by Jan III Sobieski; the privilege subordinated Węgłowski to the authority of Gypsies in the Crown and the Grand Duchy of Lithuania
Jan Deweltowski	1703-1705; with particular emphasis on Lithuania and Samogitia
Bonawentura Jan Wiera	appointed by a privilege from 1705 - with distinction of the Przemyśl, Lviv and Sanok lands
Żulicki	
Stanisław Godziemba Niziński	
Jakub Trzciński	1729-1731 in the Crown and in Polish-Lithuanian Commonwealth.
Franciszek Bogusławski	appointed king in 1731, the first head of the Gypsies with a royal title, in the Crown and in Polish-Lithuanian Commonwealth
Bartosza Alexandrowicza	1732
Józef Gozdawa Boczkowski	appointed in 1761 to the area of the Lesser Poland Voivodeship
Stefanowicz	died 1778
Jan Marcinkiewicz	1778-1790
Ignacy Marcinkiewicz	1790
Jakub Znamierowski	1780-1795; to the area of the Grand Duchy of Lithuania
Babiński	1795 head of the Gypsies in the Crown
Basiu	Hetman (Siero Rom) from 1820, had 5 wives and 5 horse-drawn carriages. The first horse-drawn carriage, was driven by Baso himself, accompanied by his eldest wife and her children, behind him the other women, each with their children and horse-drawn carriage. He was a wise Rom and very rich.
Daderuso	Born on the 1800-1882, Siero Rom in 1850
Felus	Born on the 1875-July 1975 died in Opole, Siero Rom in 1920-1974
Woci Kozlowski	Siero Rom in 1974-1990
Henryk Nudziu Kozlowski	Born on the 12/10/1946-02/04/2021 died in Nowa Dwory, Siero Rom in 1990-2021

=== During the Polish partitions ===
After Poland's partitions, the persecution of Polska Roma became more severe, particularly in the Russian partition. As a result, the group's population's size declined, at one point falling to as low as 1000 persons within Congress Poland. Finally, the 1880 century saw an influx of other Romani into the territories of the former Poland, particularly the Kalderash and Lovari. They adopted many customs of the Polska Roma, the Polska Roma do not recognize them and do not see them as real Roma, they are called Ostriaki or Rumuny.

=== Porajmos ===
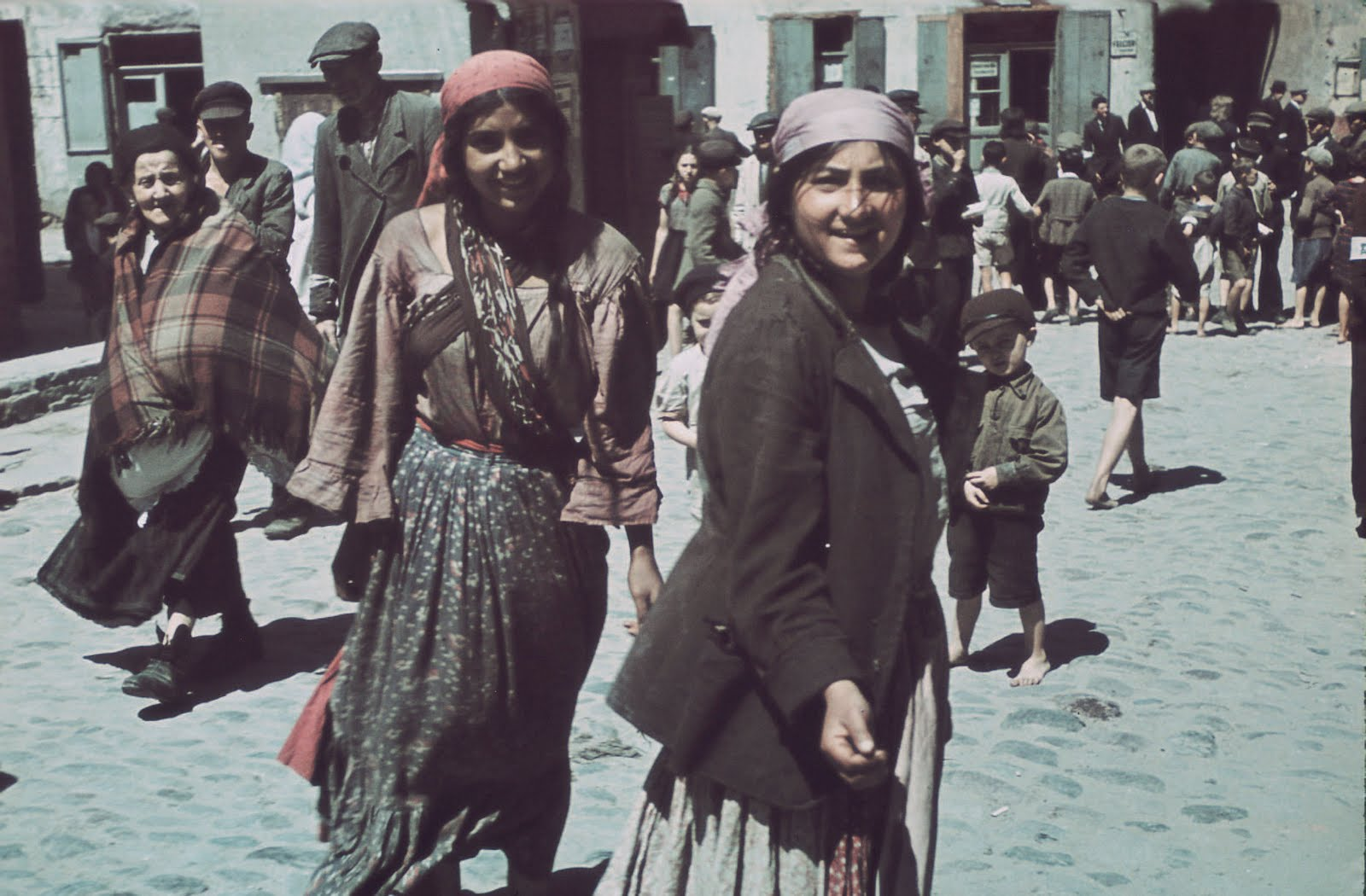
Roma women in the Lublin ghetto, 1941

After the German invasion and occupation of Poland the Nazis carried out a planned genocide of the Roma population as part of the final solution. Polska Roma, along with other Romani groups in Poland were very much affected. Generally, while other Roma were usually placed in ghettos and then sent to Nazi concentration camps, the German SS usually murdered Polska Roma (as well as the Bergitka Roma) in mass executions in forests and secluded places (for example in the Szczurowa massacre).

=== After World War II ===
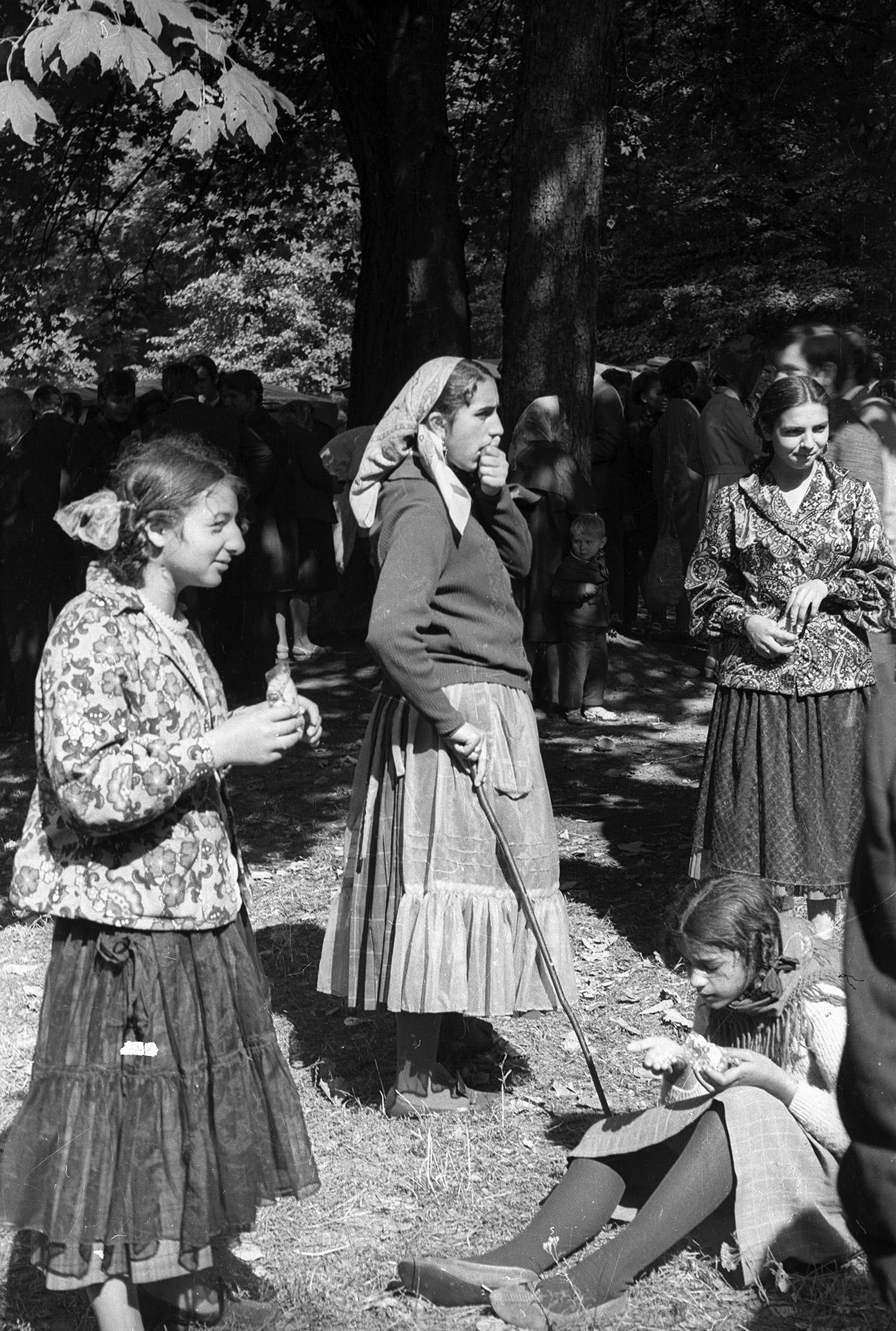
Roma girls near Konin, 1970

While prior to World War II a small portion of Polska Roma had become sedentary, most continued a traditional nomadic way of life. Unlike the Lovari and Kalderash, who often engaged in cross-national Europe-wide travels, Polska Roma tended to stay within the borders of interwar Poland or neighboring countries.

After the war, however, the communist government of People's Poland instituted a policy aimed at the "settling" of the Roma population which had survived the Holocaust. Initially, this took the form of financial incentives - including free housing and "settlement funds" - but because the policy did not achieve the goals the communist authorities hoped for, by the late 1950s the policy evolved into one of forced settlement and outright prohibitions against the "nomadic" lifestyle. All Polska Roma had to register, "vagrancy" was outlawed, and Romani parents were often jailed if their children failed to attend the same school throughout the year (which was impossible in the context of a nomadic lifestyle). This forced policy resulted in about 80% of the previously nomadic Roma becoming settled, while a portion of the remainder went underground. Still, others emigrated abroad.

The Polska Roma poet Papusza (Bronisława Wajs) became nationally renowned during this period, as did her nephew, Edward Dębicki.

== Polska Roma today ==
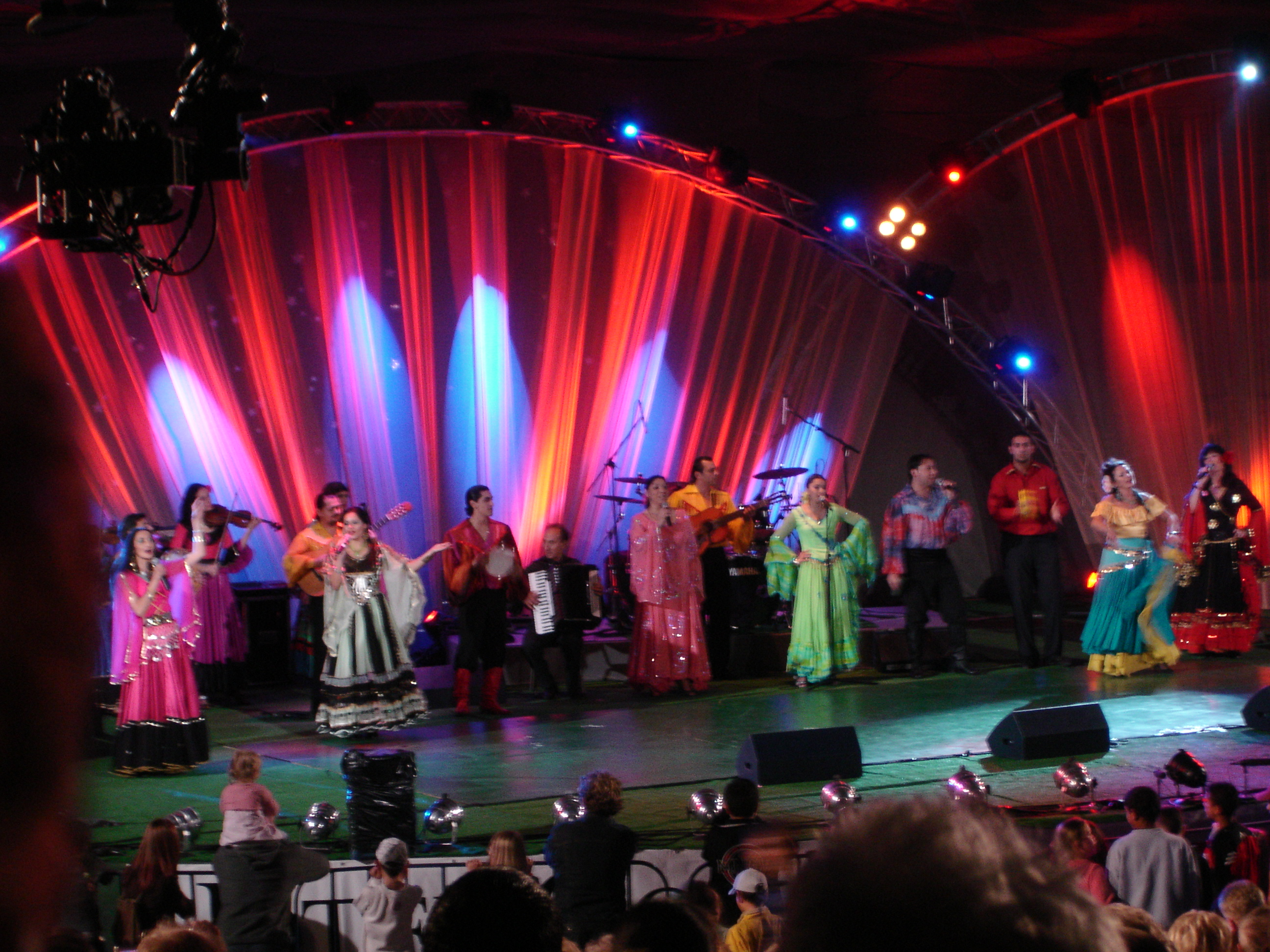
Edward Dębicki with the Roma musical group Terno in Gorzów Wielkopolski in 2007.

Today the Polska Roma live throughout Poland except southern Poland. In southern Poland, the Górska Roma (also called Bergitka Roma) in the area around Nowy Sącz, in Podhale and Spisz.

In June 1991 the Mława riot occurred, which was a series of violent incidents against Polska Roma that broke out after one Polish man was killed and another Polish man was permanently harmed when a Romani teenager drove into three ethnic Poles in a crosswalk, killing one, then fled the scene of the accident. After the accident a rioting mob attacked wealthy Romani settlements in the Polish town of Mława. Both the Mława police chief and University of Warsaw sociology researchers said that the pogrom was primarily due to class envy (some Romani have grown wealthy in the gold and automobile trades). At the time, the mayor of the town, as well as the Romani involved and other residents, said the incident was not racially motivated.

During the coverage of the riot, a change in ethnic stereotypes about Roma in Poland was mentioned: A Roma is no longer poor, dirty, or cheerful. They also do not beg or pretend to be lowly. Nowadays a Roma drives a high-status car, lives in a fancy mansion, flaunts his wealth, brags that the local authorities and the police are on his pay and thus he is not afraid of anybody. At the same time he is, as before, a swindler, a thief, a hustler, a dodger of military service and a holder of a legal, decent job. Negative "meta-stereotypes" – or the Romani people's own perceptions regarding the stereotypes that members of the dominant groups hold about their own group – were described by the Polish Roma Society in an attempt to intensify the dialogue about exclusionism.

== Places ==
Cygański Las

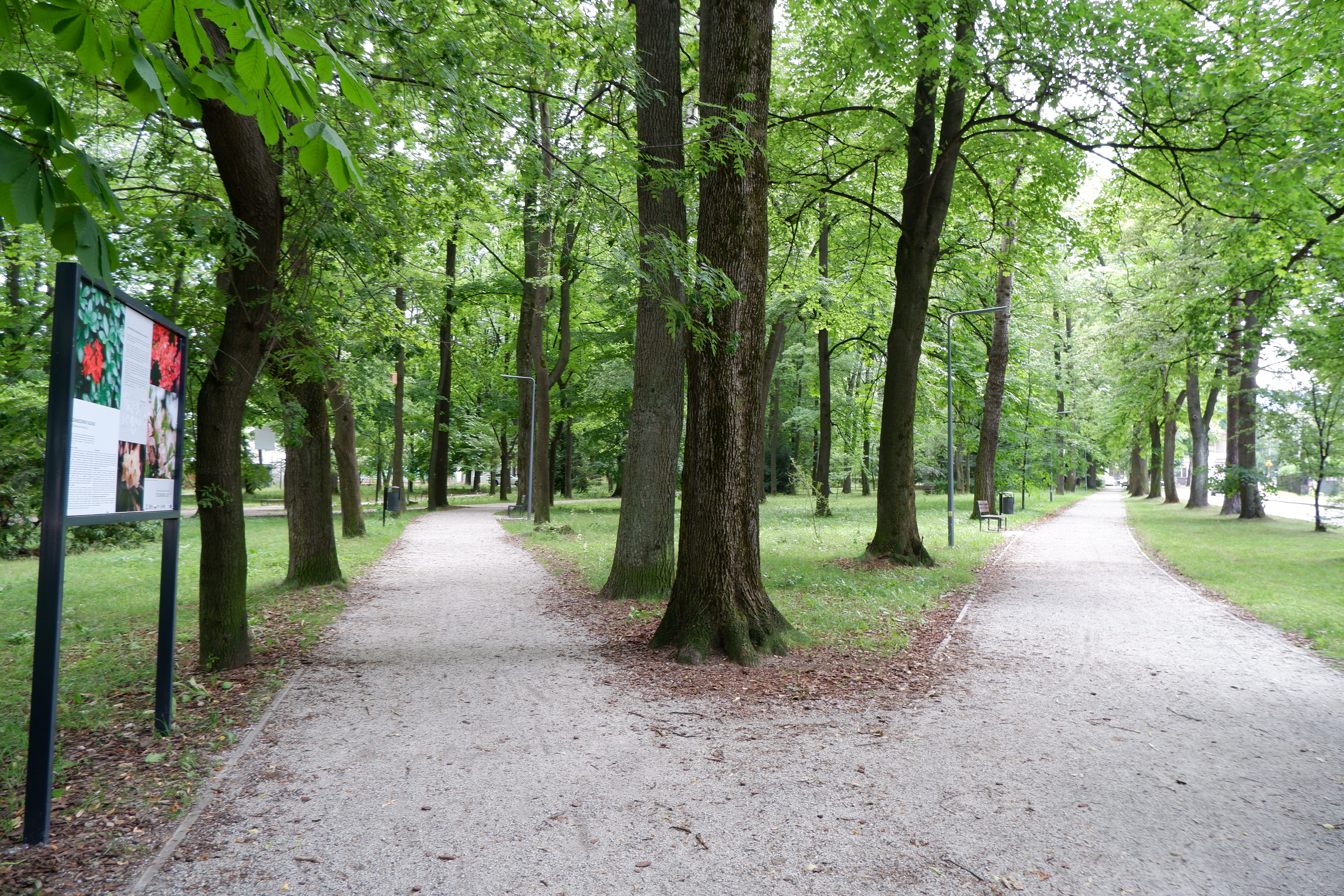
Cygański Las

Due to the fact that in the past Bielsko always shared the fate of the Duchy of Cieszyn, it belonged to Poland, then to the Czech Republic, then to the Kingdom of Hungary and the Czech Republic, and in the years 1526-1918 to the Habsburg Austrian Monarchy. In 1644, when the city, and with it the urban forest, was under Austrian rule, the voivode of Masovia, the castellan of Krakow and the owner of Łodygowice - Stanisław Warszycki, forcibly occupied the forest and used it for many years, causing losses estimated at 55,000 thalers. From 1861 documents, the urban forest began to be referred to as the Cygański Las (Gypsy Forest). The name most likely comes from the fact that wandering Roma camps have been camping in the forest since the 15th century.

== See also ==
- Racism in Poland – Roma
- Centralna Rada Romów
- Book of Contacts and good Practices
- Jewish–Romani relations
- A newly discovered founder population: the Roma/Gypsies
- Mitochondrial DNA diversity in the Polish Roma
