= Polish Roma =

Polish Roma may refer to:

- Polska Roma
- Romani people in Poland
