= Mikhail Shishkin =

Mikhail Shishkin may refer to

- Mikhail Shishkin (footballer) (born 1980), Russian association football player
- Mikhail Shishkin (writer) (born 1961), Russian writer
