= Olga Shishkina =

Olga Shishkina may refer to:

- Olga Shishkina (musician) (born 1985)
- Olga Shishkina (physicist) (born 1988)
