= Oreanda Hotel =

Coordinates: 44.4892°N 34.1617°E

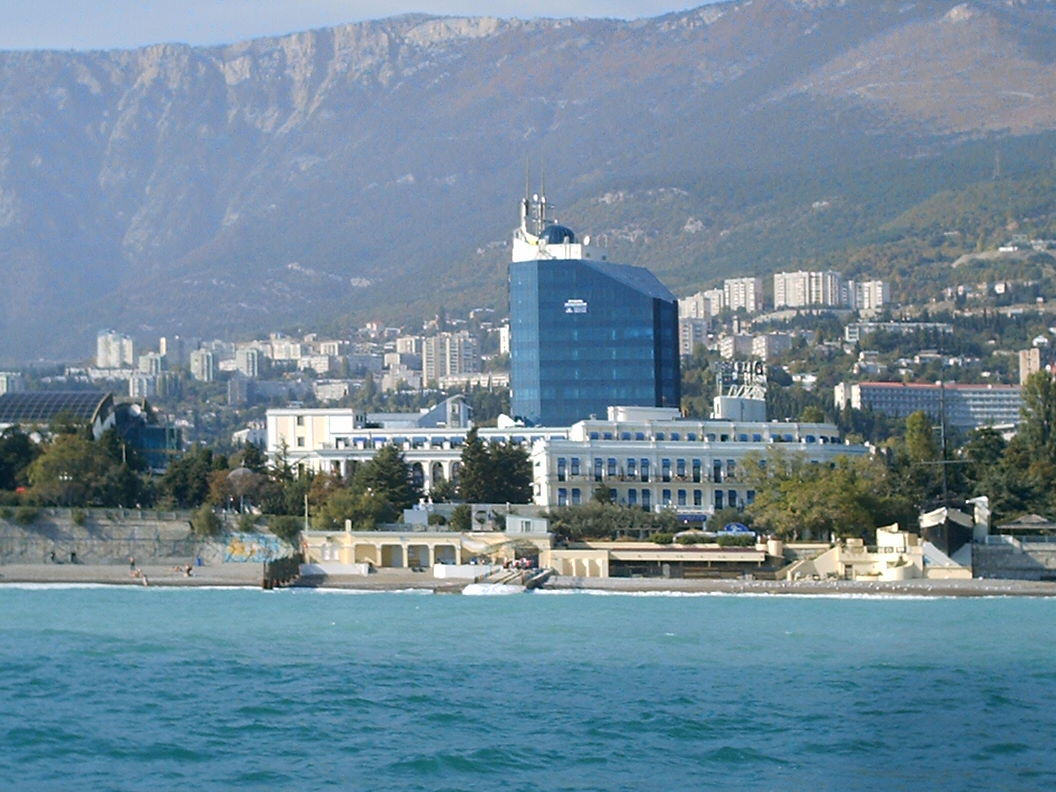
Hotel Oreanda is the large four-story yellow building in the foreground

The Oreanda Hotel is a 4-star, historic hotel in Yalta, Crimea, opened in 1907. It is considered a city landmark and overlooks the coastline and neighboring mountains.

== Rooms and suites ==
The Oreanda offers 119 rooms, the majority with sea and mountain views decorated in traditional style. There are 21 junior suites, 14 suites and 5 apartments. Two apartments bear the names of "Massandra" and "Livadia" – Crimean palaces which once belonged to the Russian Emperor Family - and another apartment is named "Imperial".

== History ==
The Hotel was built in 1907 by Alexander Vitmer – a retired general with Danish origins. Pre-revolutionary guide-books state that the hotel had "perfect provision, excellent furniture, mirror glasses, fresh air and a well kept garden around". In the lobby an incomparable smell of cigars mixed with a delicate aroma of ground coffee and expensive perfumes, its art saloon exhibited the work of Shishkin, Vereschagin and other maitres who started cultural traditions of Oreanda.

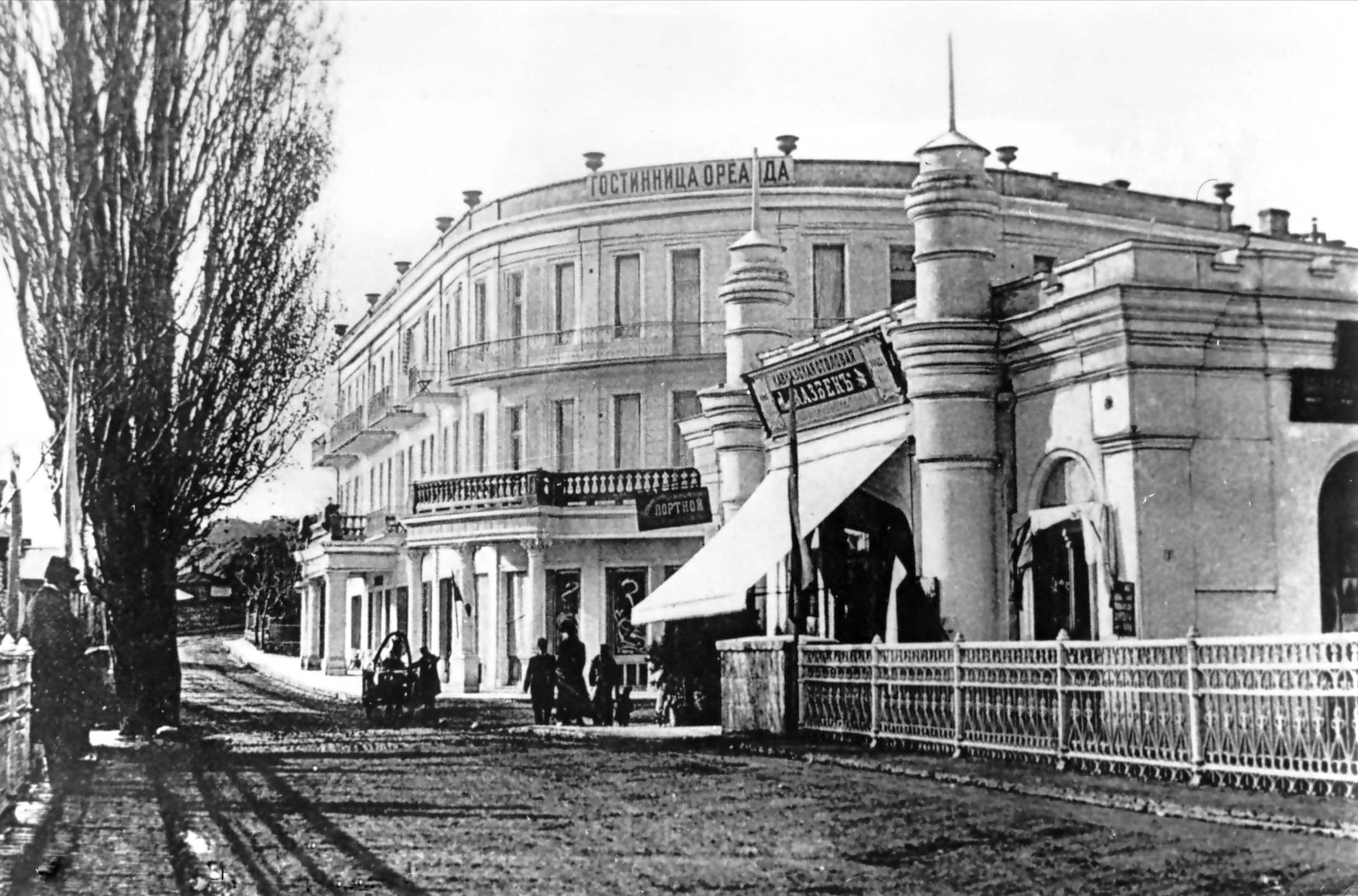
Hotel Oreanda, soon after it opened

In 1918, during the revolutionary period in Yalta, the hotel served as a fort post and defensive fortification for the Crimean opponents of Bolsheviks.

At the beginning of the World War II, a military hospital was placed here. After the war, the hotel was converted into a recreation centre where the wounded soldiers and officers were treated. By the end of the 1950s with capital repairs, the Oreanda regained the status of a hotel.
