= Terno (disambiguation) =

Terno may refer to:

- Gerda Maria Terno, a German actress
- Maria Clara terno, a traditional dress in the Philippines
- Terno, a Polish music collective
