= Romani people in Poland =

Romowie w Polsce

Total population
- Approx. 50,000 (2011, census, Indo-Aryan origins) Indo-Aryan origins (including those of ancestral descent)

Regions with significant populations
- Małopolskie, Dolnośląskie, Mazowieckie, Warsaw, Poznań, Wrocław, Łódź, Kraków, Mielec, Puławy and Nowa Dęba regions.

Languages
- Baltic Romani, Polish, Kashubian, German

Religion
- Majority Roman Catholicism

Related ethnic groups
- Romani people in Belarus, Romani people in the Czech Republic, Romani people in Germany, Romani people in Hungary, Romani people in Lithuania, Romani people in Slovakia

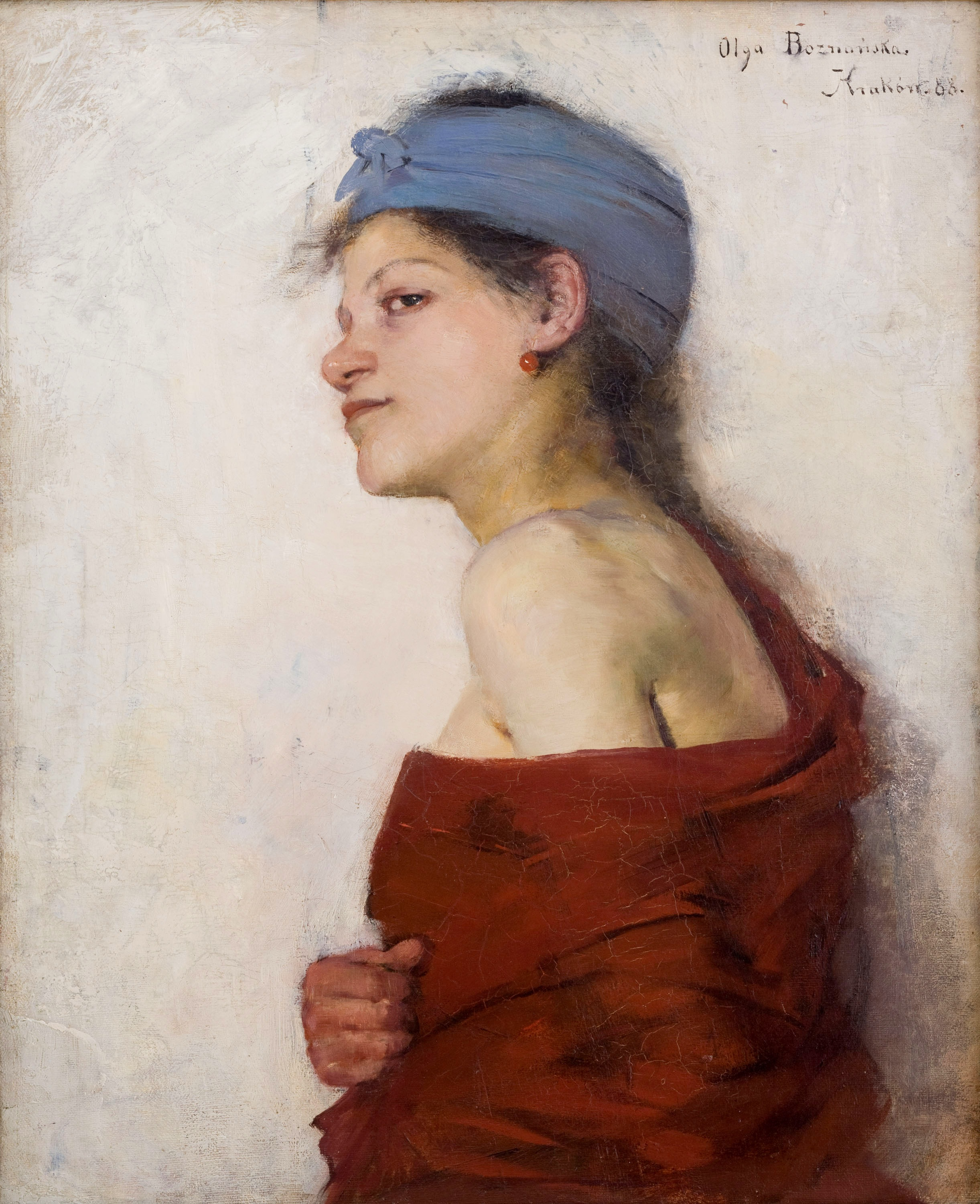
Cyganka by Olga Boznánska, 1888

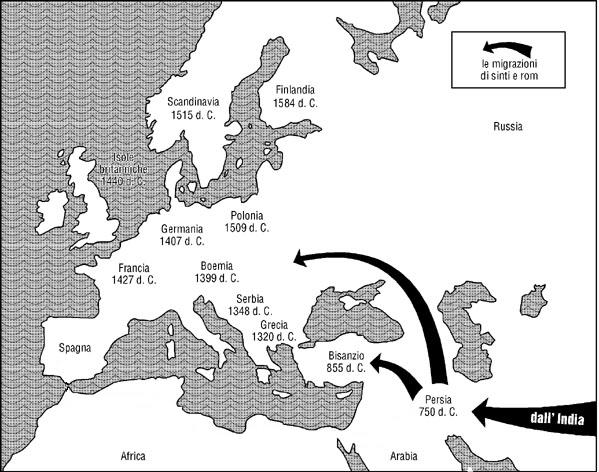
Diagram of Roma migration to Europe

The Romani people in Poland (Polish: Romowie w Polsce) are an Indo-Aryan ethnic minority group in Poland. The Council of Europe regards the endonym "Roma" as more appropriate when referencing the people, and "Romani" when referencing cultural characteristics. The term Cyganie (IPA: [t͡sɘˈɡaɲɛ]) is considered an exonym in Poland.

Major Roma groups in Poland include: the Polska (Polska Roma), Kalderash, Lovari and Bergitka Roma; the Polska Roma are the largest group.

The recorded history of the Romani people in Poland dates to the 15th century. As per historical linguistic evidence, the Roma likely arrived in present-day Poland between 1400 and 1500. Further evidence from the 20th century exhibits the Roma's persecution by occupying forces of Nazi Germany during the Holocaust, and subsequent alienation in the Polish People's Republic. The collapse of the Eastern Bloc and Poland's transformation brought about societal and economic developments for the Roma. The Romani language is composed of several dialects, influenced by Slavic languages. Rituals followed, such as the "Romani Caravan of Memory", pertain to the Roma's history in Poland. There is also a significant local adherence to a culturally influenced Roman Catholicism.

Compiled evidence from the early 21st century shows that the Roma experience difficulties and successes in acquiring quality housing in Poland. Roma children are also reported to be enrolled in school, with some requiring 'special-needs' assistance. Roma continue to experience tensions such as high unemployment rates, forced evictions, violence and societal ostracisation.

== Designation ==
Cygan is a pejorative term used in Poland to refer to the Roma. Cygan and the verb "ocyganić" ("to cheat") share an etymology; Cygan connotes qualities such as theft and lying.

== Demographics ==
=== Census ===
As of 2012, 96% of residents in Poland claim to be ethnically Polish and 4% claim to belong to another ethnicity. In a 2011 census, 12,560 people claimed to be Roma and 17,049 considered Roma as either their primary or secondary ethnicity. It is, however estimated that there are around 50,000 Roma in Poland.

=== Geographic dispersion ===
As of 2007, 93% of Polish Roma live in cities; 13% in the Lesser Poland, 10% in Lower Silesia and 10% in Masovia regions. The Bergitka Roma primarily reside in Lesser Poland, whereas, the Keldrash and Lovari, as of 2012 predominantly reside in Warsaw, Poznan, Wroclaw, Lodz, Krakow, Mielec and Pulawy.

In the Lesser Poland province, some of the regions settled by Roma include Czarna Góra, Czarny Dunajec-Kamieniec, Koszary and Krośnica.

== Historical Backdrop ==
=== Origins ===
Linguistic evidence shows the Roma's emigration from Northwestern India to Europe, between the 3rd to 7th century AD, and to Poland at around 1400. Their emigration may be attributed to the surge in Roma killings during 1400–1500 in Western Europe, as Poland was relatively more welcoming.

=== Interwar period ===
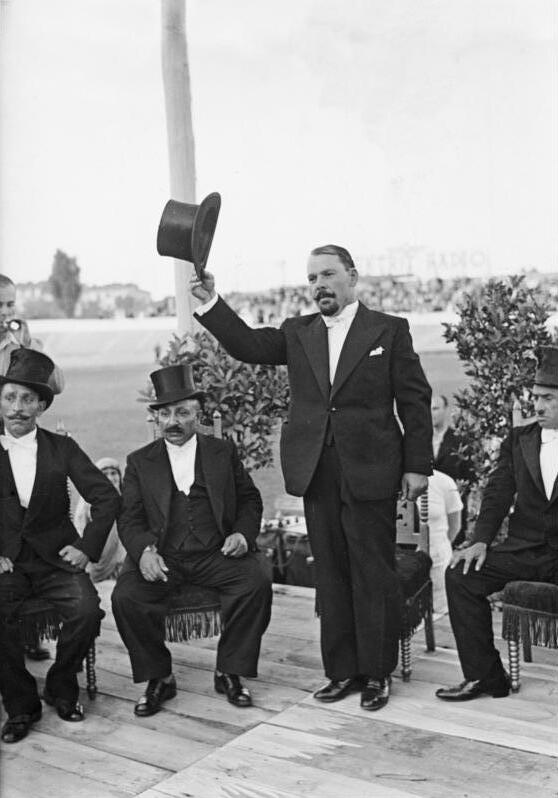
Crowning of Roma King

Poland gained its independence in 1918 and the Second Polish Republic was formed. In 1930, the emergence of a nationalist sentiment in Poland encouraged the development of a separate Roma authority, predominantly composed of the Kalderash subgroup. The Kalderash gained recognition by non-Roma authorities such as, the Police, by performing requested tasks in exchange for validation of the Roma authority. In 1918, the first two Roma kings emerged: Michalak I and Gregory, their rule was premised on publicising the Roma's interests and concerns. In 1928, records show the appointment of Jan Michalak and Dymitr Koszoe Kwiek.

In 1930, Michalak Kwiek was the first 'Gypsy King' to be publicly crowned in Warsaw. Speculations by the public about Kwiek prioritising his self-interest lead to his dethroning. In August 1930, Vasil Kwiek attained the throne. In 1934 Michal attempted to regain the throne through a re-election, the outcome of his attempt is disputed by academics. Klimová-Alexander states that his attempt failed, Ficowski and Liegeois state that he was successful and reigned for a further five years.

Following 1934, competing claims to the throne emerged, Janusz Kwiek was the last ruler, who reigned from 1937 until he was subsequently killed during the Porrajmos (WWII).

=== World War II ===
The 'Romani Holocaust' or Porrajmos, denotes the Nazi effort to eliminate the Roma population. As per Ian Hancock and Yitzhak Arad, the number of Romani deaths are uncertain due to the concealment of records in 'mass extermination camps' such as "Birkenau, Belzec, Treblinka".

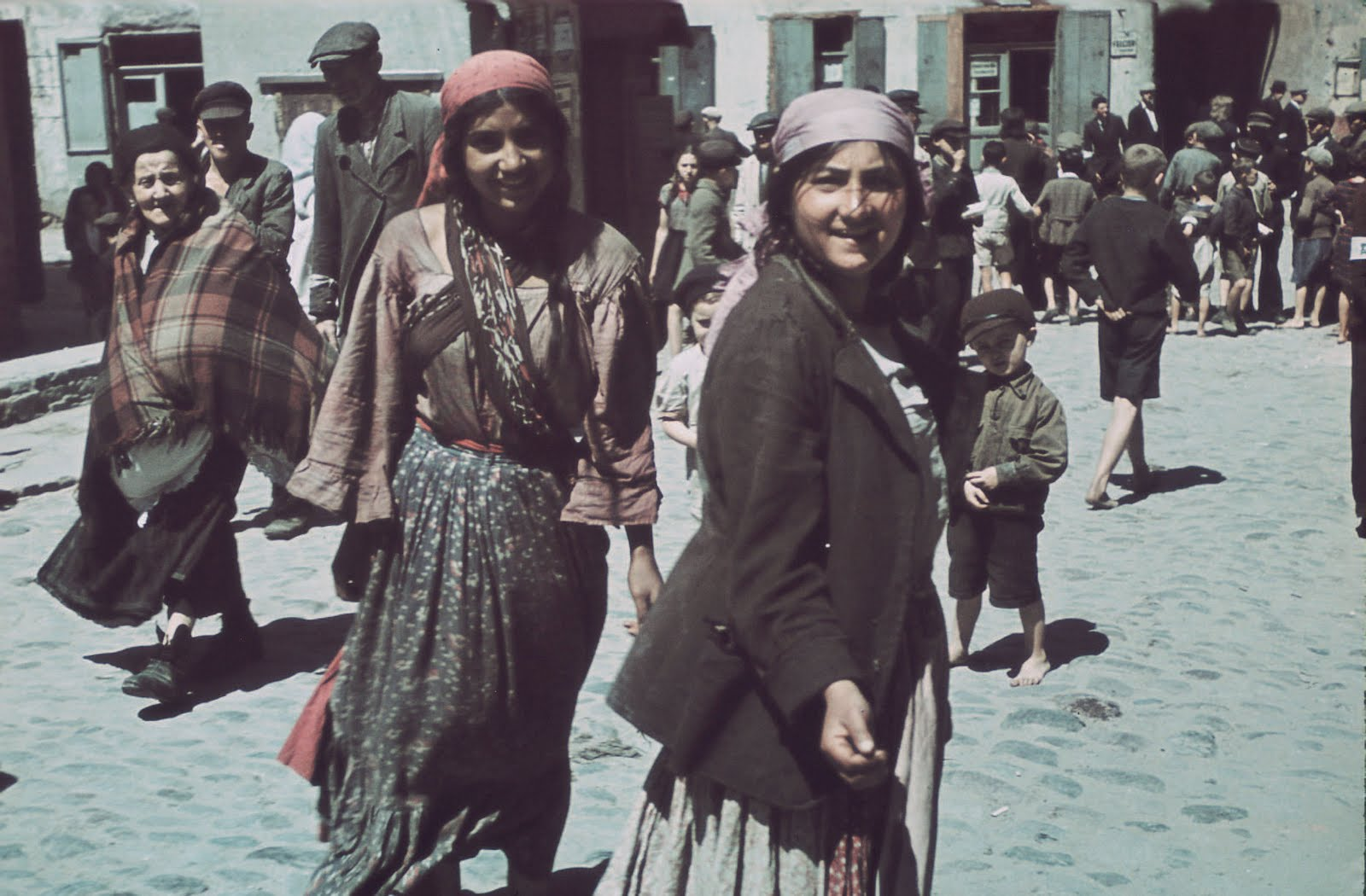
Roma women in the Lublin Ghetto

Arad writes that albeit the Roma were racially Aryan, their nomadism was depicted by the Nazis as a threat to European societies. In 1941, Heinrich Himmler, a leading member of the Nazi party sent 5,000 Roma to the 'Łódź ghetto' in German-occupied Poland, which contained a Roma designated camp: Zigeunerlager. Due to poor maintenance conditions "spotted fever" arose and killed over seven hundred Roma. Bełzec was another labour camp which accommodated 2,500 Roma; poor working conditions in Bełzec lead to a malnutrition epidemic as well as the dispersion of diseases such as typhoid.

The Roma were also sent to camps in Auschwitz-Birkenau and Warsaw and then sent to Treblinka and killed. Some were murdered in gas chambers and others were shot at the 'Lazarett'. Arad estimates that in "Krakow, Sanok, Jalso and Rzeszow", around 1,000 Romanies were shot. Celinska estimates that 220,000–500,000 Roma were killed during the Holocaust.

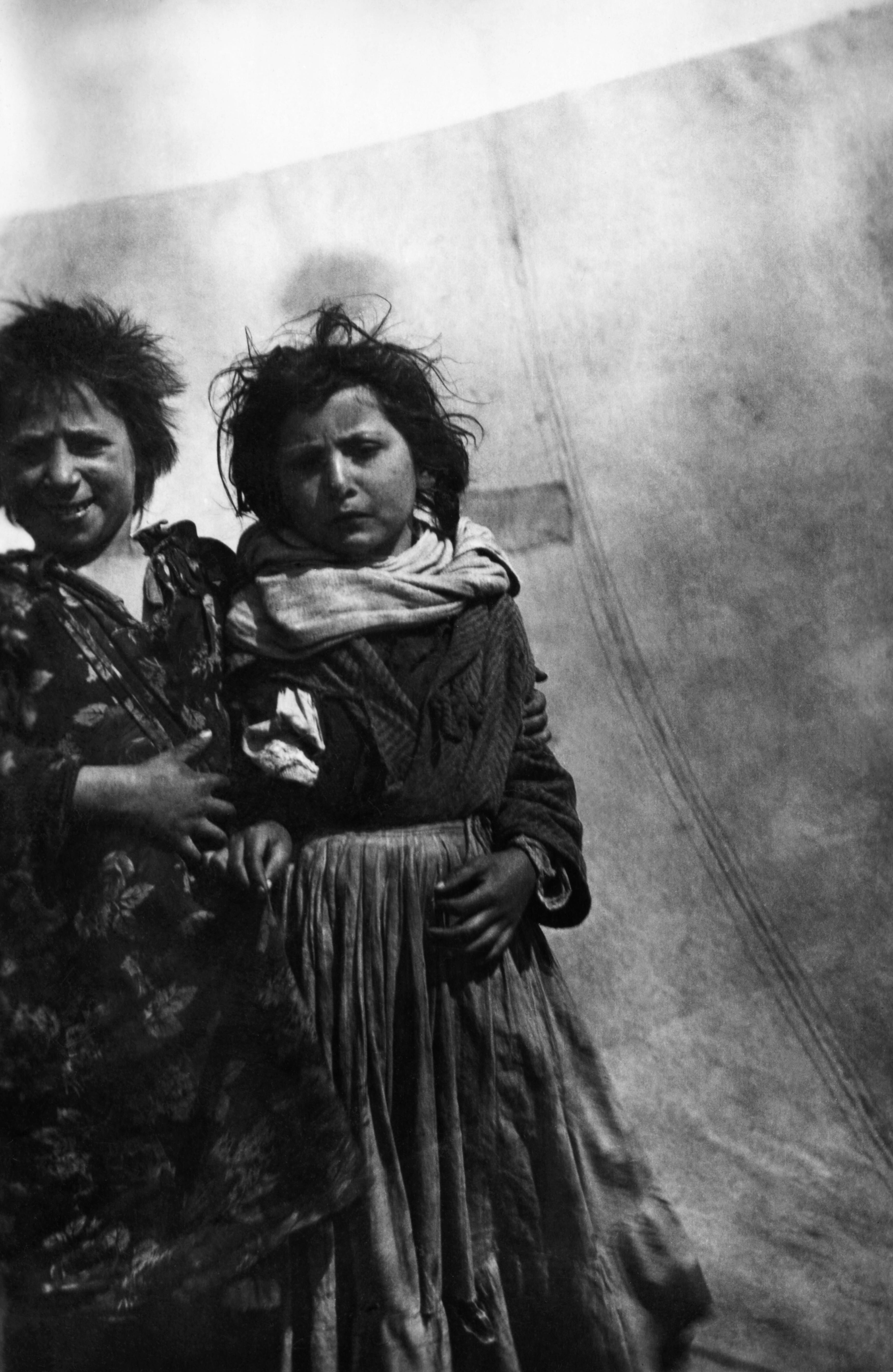
Roma and Sinti Peoples at Radom, Poland, during the Second World War

While both Roma and Jewish populations were persecuted during the holocaust, the Roma have mainly been left out of reparation conversations due to the citizenship-based nature of such policies.

As of the Second World War, Poland is considered an ethnically and culturally homogeneous country. Additionally, in Polish society, discrimination against Romani people is considered a social, rather than ethnic issue.

=== PRL period ===
After the war, Poland became a satellite state of the Soviet Union and remained so until 1989. The ruling Polish United Workers Party (PZPR), the dominant government force in the country's one-party state system, attempted to cultivate a uniform civic identity, and forcefully settle the Roma.

According to Talewicz-Kwiatkowska this resulted in problems for the Roma: living in apartments and houses, was incompatible with their nomadic lifestyle, where they could usually engage in activities such as, "make bonfires" without disturbing their neighbours.

Education-wise the Roma "sedentarization" lead to an increase in schooling amongst Roma: 25% from 1950–1960 to 82% in 1970s. Due to cultural and linguistic variances between Roma children and non-Roma educators, they were reportedly placed in separate classes and subject to different curriculums.

In the PRL (Polish People's Republic), the Roma were classified as a "social group" rather than an ethnic one, precluding their involvement in the national census. In 1955 an attempt was made by the Polish authorities to identify the Roma population in Poland through the implementation of the "Roma passport operation", Roma who did not hold valid ID cards or "residence registration cards" were penalised.

Assimilation policies attempted to increase positive attitudes toward the Roma, but failed to do so. At the same time, the Romani people did receive some benefits during this time period because of their ability to have access to social services that were funded by the government.

=== Post-Soviet dissolution ===
Following the events of 1989 and Poland's transformation into a unitary semi-presidential republic with democratic elections, Roma organisations such as the Association of Roma were founded in Poland. Thanks to the collapse of the Soviet-backed government, the Romani people were able to enjoy more cultural freedoms but did not have access to the same level of social services that they previously received in the PRL. The United Nations criticised Poland's new government for failing to provide sufficient support to the Roma in the 1990s. During the 1990s Roma political parties were created.

In 1990 the 'Solidarity government' in Poland commenced its economic privatisation, resulting in the loss of industry jobs for sedentary Roma such as the Carpathian Roma. Whereas, Nomadic Roma who had international ties were able to import goods that were in demand in Poland, such as carpets.

According to a Polish police chief, the consequential wealth experienced by some Roma in the early 1990s possibly contributed to resentment by some ethnic Poles, as between 1990 and 1991 Poland experienced a decline in its 'national income' by 13% and an annual inflation rate of 585%. The surge in resentment is exemplified by the "Mława pogrom" that occurred in 1991, in which much Roma property was destroyed and Roma families were forced to hide or flee after a fatal hit-and-run incident sparked a popular outrage that led to the unrest; Mława, where the car accident and subsequent riot took place, was experiencing high levels of unemployment (35%), relative to the national 10%. Mayor Chmieliński also stated that tensions may have been rooted in racism, which the dissolution of censorship in the 1990s allowed to surface.

== Customs and culture ==
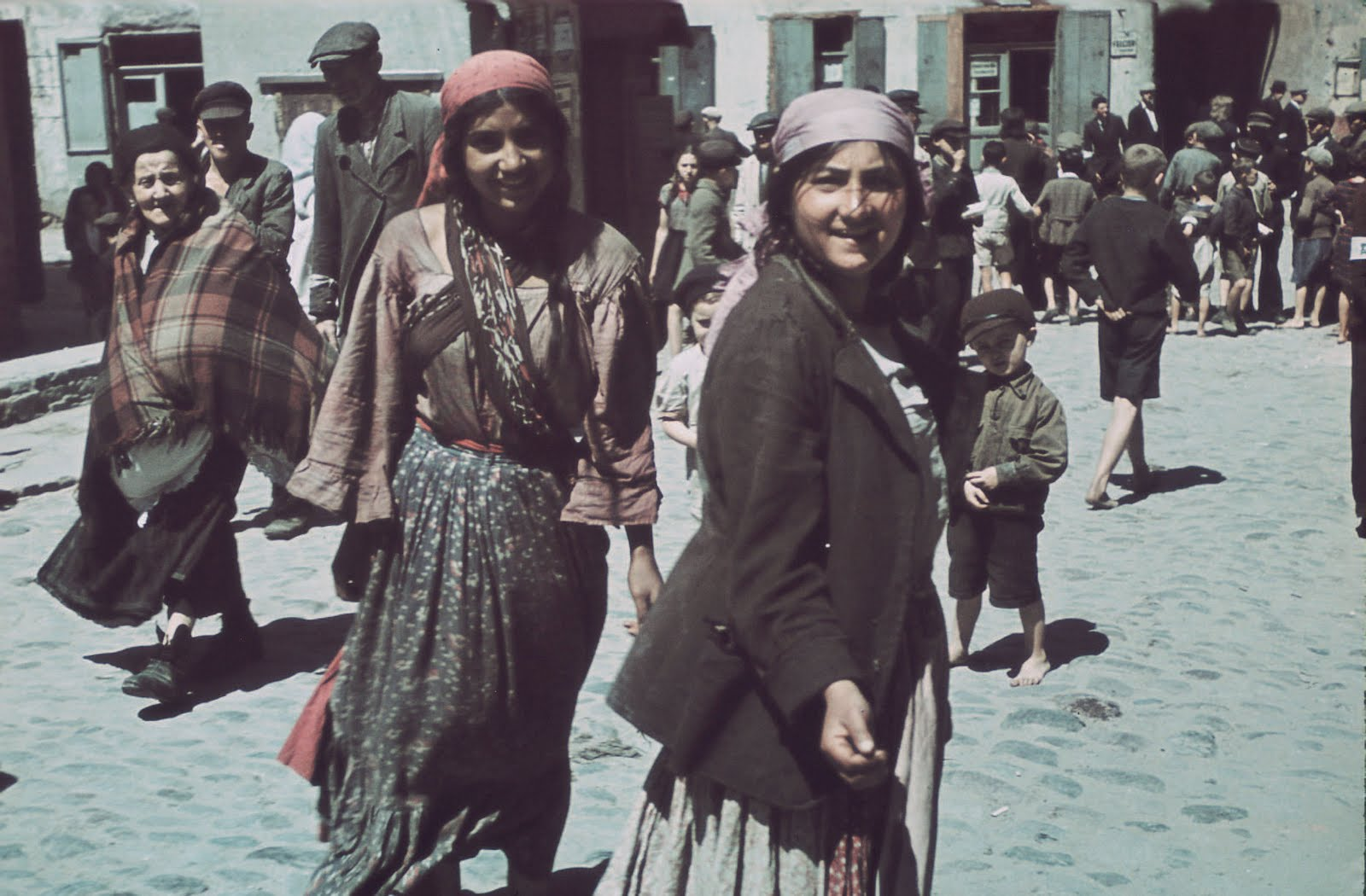
Romani women in Lublin, 1940

=== Language ===
As per a 2008 survey, 90% of the 500 Romanies interviewed in Poland claimed to predominantly speak Romani. Poland has granted "official status" to the Romani language as a non-territorial language, it is however not formally recognised by Poland's educational system. Roma subgroups speak several dialects: the Bergitka Roma speak Carpathian Romani and others speak Baltic Romani. These dialects are mostly influenced by the Polish, Slovak and Hungarian languages, yet the extent of their influence is contingent on the degree of a group's assimilation into the respective population.

The Polish influence on the Romani language is evidenced by the phonological borrowing of the sound [w] and lexical borrowings: 12.5% of the Polska Roma and 21.5% of the Bergitka Roma's vocabulary is derived from the Polish language (inclusive of Slavic languages). Such vocabulary involves, the names of institutions, "semantic dwellings": houses, furniture etc. and "semantic fields of nature": plants, animals etc. According to Meyer, the ratio of the borrowing of noun to verbs to adjectives for the Polska Roma is (6:1:1) and (6:2:1) for the Bergitka.

The incorporation of Slavic languages into the Romani language has also been done through calquing. An example is the "syntactic model" for what is your name?, which in Romani is "Sar pes vičines?", influenced by the Slavic (Polish): "Jak się nazywasz?"

=== Sociocultural organisation ===
Roma society in Poland is structured around a set of culture principles articulated as the 'Romanipen'. In accordance with 'Romanipen', the Roma are discouraged from sharing their cultural values or language with non-Roma (Gadjo) and from resolving disputes externally.

The Roma in Poland also have a distinct internal judicial system, consisting of a Court, the Romano Celo and a prevailing authority, the Sero Rom, which only the Roma are subject to.

=== Traditions ===
The Roma has historically endorsed traditional gender roles: a woman is expected to bear children, undertake domestic duties and men are the main income earners. However, as of 2019, in subgroups such as the Bergitka, women are increasingly permitted to pursue professional careers.

Furthermore, since 1996, the "Romani Caravan of Memory", a Bergitka Romani ritual occurs annually in Tarnow, Poland. The ritual involves a trip intended to preserve a collective memory of the Roma persecution in the Holocaust. A central stop of the trip is at Szczurowa, where the massacre of ninety-three Romani people by the Nazis on 1943 is commemorated.

Another Roma tradition is the pilgrimage to the "Holy Mary of Rywałd", a figure in Rywałd Królewski, which began in 1930 and involves the making of offerings by Roma to the figure.

=== Religion ===
97% of the Roma in Poland claim to adhere to a cultural form of Roman Catholicism, wherein Roma cultural beliefs are merged with Roman Catholicism. This is manifest in religious practices, such as the seven-hour pilgrimage to the 'Sanctuary of Our Lady of Sorrows in Limanowa'.

== Government: Socio-Economics ==
=== Housing ===
According to the Immigration and Refugee Board of Canada, the scarcity of economical accommodation in Poland has contributed to housing difficulties for the Roma. Approximately 21% lack access to either: an "indoor kitchen, indoor toilet, indoor shower or bath or electricity", some Roma families, however, reside in lavish houses.

=== Employment ===
According to an EU survey conducted in 2012, around 35% of Romani residing in Poland, ages 20–64, claimed to be unemployed and around 25% of Romani claimed to be engaged in paid employment. Celinska points towards Roma involvement in "small businesses" such as car sales.

As per a US State Department report, as of 2020 Roma children are reportedly involved in "forced begging".

Additionally, the undervaluing of 'traditional' skills in the Polish economy has contributed to Roma poverty.

=== Education ===
Osuch and Dwojak state that structured education is generally not valued in Romani culture, rather, it is perceived as "forced assimilation". Traditionally, children's education is provided for by the 'elders' of the Roma community. A study conducted in 2016 revealed that 82% of Bergitka Roma mothers support their children's schooling.

In 2009/2010, 82% of Roma children aged 6–16 years were reported to be enrolled in school. Evidence also shows the segregation of Roma children from non-Roma in schools: in 2011, 17% of Romani were reported to be enrolled in special needs schools and/or classes. Furthermore, in the Maszkowice village, Roma and non-Roma must enter schools from separate entries. Kwadrans attributes the increased allocation towards 'special needs' to a cultural and linguistic disjuncture between the Roma children and their educators.

In 2020, the US State Department reported that the Polish government directed $2.88 million towards bolstering the provision of national services, such as education, to Romani people by for example, "providing school grants for Romani high school and university students".

In terms of education, Romani children have lower rates of education within Poland due to a combination of reported discrimination within the education system and hesitation by Romani parents to send their children to school where the dominant culture's values are taught and upheld.

== Political representation ==
There has been no inclusion of the Roma in the Polish parliament to date. As a recognised minority group in Poland, the Roma hold constitutional rights to determine their own cultural and traditional values.

In 2001–2003, the Polish government implemented the "pilot government programme for the Roma community in the Malopolska province", an inchoate programme which sought to include Roma in decisions about their wellbeing, education, employment etc.

Since becoming a member of the European Union in 2004, Poland has adopted several minority protection policies like the FCNM and the European Charter for Regional or Minority Languages. While these policies have been adopted, the Polish government has faced criticism for not making greater efforts to stop discrimination against the Romani people.

== Contemporary tension ==
=== Evictions ===
Roma communities in Poland are increasingly subject to forced evictions. On 22 July 2016 in Wroclaw, Poland, Amnesty International reported that while Roma people were not home, they were evicted without notice.

=== Violence ===
There has also been reported violence against the Roma in Poland, in 2009 an EU survey conveyed that around 28% Romanies experienced some form of violence in the last twelve months. One instance involved an attack on a Roma family by a Polish mob in Limanowa, following an incident between a Polish woman and a dog belonging to a Roma family.

=== Ostracism ===
Surveys reflect a sentiment of ostracism felt by the Romani people in Poland. As per interviews conducted in 2008 by the EU, 59% of Romanies feel alienated due to their ethnicity. Almost half feel ostracised in "cafes, restaurants, bars", 19% claimed to have felt this in employment and 18% by social services.

The implementation of immigration policies by the Polish government, such as, the "on-the-spot" deportation policy has increased the societal ostracism of the Roma. Another immigration/EU citizenship policy requires Roma (and other applicants) to pass a resources test that requires a proof of address, which nomadic Romani may not possess.

=== Societal attitudes ===
A poll conducted by CBOS in 2013 centred around the question, "How would you rate your relationship toward different nations?" which was asked to thirty-six Roma groups, the results showed that in contrast to the 13% which claimed to dislike the Czechs, 52% disliked the Roma.

== Personalities ==
- Bronisława Wajs – commonly known as Papusza – female poet
- Alfreda Markowska – saved Romani and Jewish children during the German occupation of Poland.
- Edyta Górniak – singer, runner-up of the Eurovision Song Contest 1994
- Viki Gabor – singer, winner of the Junior Eurovision Song Contest 2019

== See also ==
- Romani diaspora
