= Baltic Romani =

Group of dialects of the Romani language

- Native to: Poland, Lithuania, Latvia, Belarus, Russia, Estonia, Finland, Germany
- Native speakers: (46,000, including 14,000 in Poland and 10,000 in Finland cited 2001–2013)
- Language family: Indo-European: Indo-Iranian; Indo-Aryan; Western Indo-Aryan; Romani; Northern Romani; Baltic Romani
- Dialects: Polska Roma Sasytka-Pluniakitkes, Lesiaki, Warmiaki, Bosaki, Marciny, Kaliszaki, Radomiaki, Rapaci, Ciejaki, Szczalkowiaki, Berniki-Bareforytka, Sileciaki, Jaglany, Omziniaki, Opolaki, Judy; Baltic Lajenge Roma, Lotfitka Roma, Laloritka Roma, Xeladytka Roma; Russian Northern Xeladytka-Ruska Roma; Belarusian Bajale Roma, Xeladytka-Ruska Roma; Finland Kale Roma

Language codes
- ISO 639-3: rml
- Glottolog: balt1257
- ELP: Baltic Romani

Baltic Romani (Note: Also called Balt Romani, Balt Slavic Romani, Baltic Slavic Romani, and colloquially as Roma.) is a group of dialects of the Romani language spoken in the Baltic states and adjoining regions of Finland, Poland, Russia, and Ukraine. Half of Baltic Romani speakers live in Poland. Baltic Romani came from the Central Romani dialect, which branches off into other dialects. There are a total of around 31,500 users in all countries.

== Classification ==
Baltic Romani are variations of the Romani language, which is classified in the Indo-Aryan language family.

== History ==
The first speakers of this language settled in Southeast Europe during the 10th and 13th centuries in large swaths. From the 14th century onward, the language spread to Central and Western Europe as well. Comparisons between other languages later revealed it most likely originated from the Indian subcontinent.

== Geographic distribution ==
This language is spoken in the following countries:

- Poland: 13,600
- Belarus: 12,000
- Estonia: 360–460
- Latvia: 8,000
- Lithuania: 1,350
- Russian Federation

=== Official status ===
This language is not an official language in any particular country, though it has other statuses in those which it is spoken.

=== Dialects and varieties ===
- Čuxny Romani in Estonia (CL: Estonian, Russian)
- Finnish Romani (Fíntika Rómma; Finnish: Kalo) (CL: Finnish)
- Latvian Romani (Lotfitka) in Latvia, Estonia and Russia
- Lithuanian Romani in Lithuania and Belarus
- North Russian Romani (Xaladitka) in Baltic Russia and Belarus, spoken by the Ruska Roma
- Belarusian Romani or Belarus–Lithuanian Romani (Belarusko, Belaruskone-Litouskonengiro rakireben) in Belarus, spoken by the Belaruska Roma and Litovska Roma.
- Polska Roma and Sasytka Roma (German Roma not to be confused with Sinti) in Poland (CL: Polish, German)

== Phonology ==
There are three simple stop positions in the Romani language. These come from the Indo-Aryan and are maintained in every dialect of this language. The positions are as follows; labial /p/, dental /t/, and velar /k/. Along with these stop positions, there are also palatal positions which are unique to the Romani language. Specific voicing alterations have changed grammatical endings and different dialects have different ways of interpreting vowels. Some have morphed into newer versions of the Romani language and others have implemented other elements like screams.

== Grammar ==
In the Romani language, nouns and verbs are inflected to illustrate how a word acts in a sentence, similar to in other fusional languages like Sanskrit and Latin. As in other Indo-Aryan languages, as well as in Romance and Slavic languages, Romani also has grammatical gender, as there are both masculine and feminine words. In addition, there are definite articles along with "different articles for masculine and feminine nouns, for subject and non-subject and for singular and plural articles".

=== Syntax ===
Baltic Romani has a unique rule in that their numerals follow when they are written. Their numerals govern their nominals, but not to the degree that Slavic languages do. Baltic genitives mark partial objects and sometimes subjects and also play a prominent role in the syntax of numeral constructions. Baltic languages are similar, as both Latvian and Latvian Romani share the same opposition of preverbs and verb particles.

== Vocabulary ==
There is a large Indo-Aryan presence in this language that appears mainly in reference to body parts and functions. Along with bodily parts and functions, the Indo-Aryan presence also resides in words that reference time, nature, landscape, numerals, animals, and plants. There is a pre-European lexicon that is mixed in this language that mainly refers to spiritual and religious ideas, tools, and artifacts. Dwellings and places are not represented the best in the inherited lexicon of this language.

== Notes ==
Northeastern Romani

== Bibliography ==
- Bakker, P., & Ki︠u︡chukov, K. (2000). What is the Romani language? (Vol. 21). Univ of Hertfordshire Press
