= Sokolovsky gypsy choir =

The Sokolovsky gypsy choir (Russian "Соколовский хор") was founded by Count Orlov-Chesmensky in the 1770s who called on Ivan Sokolov, leader of the Roma among his serfs, to perform at his estate outside Moscow. The enslaved Roma people were granted their freedom in 1807, and Sokolov became the first in a dynasty of Roma choir leaders. The choir performed at the prestigious Yar restaurant in Moscow ("Соколовский хор у Яра"). When his descendant Grigory Sokolov died leadership passed to Nikolai Shishkin.

== Leaders of the choir ==
- Ivan Trofimovich Sokolov (Иван Трофимович Соколов 1740s-1807) patriarch and founder of the choir.
- Ilya Sokolov (Илья Соколов)
- Grigory Sokolov
- Nikolai Shishkin
