= Nikolai Shishkin =

Russian composer

Nikolai Shishkin (Kursk, 1845-1911) was a Ruska Roma guitarist and singer in the Sokolovsky Gypsy choir (Соколовский хор). After the death of choir leader Grigory Sokolov Shishkin he led the choir and inherited the role of lead sokolovskaya guitar. He was a composer and arranger of Russian songs and one of several Romani singer-composer arrangers from Kursk called Shishkin. He is not to be confused with A. I. Shishkin (А. И. Шишкин, fl.1887) composer of the romance "No, it's not you I love so fervently" (Russian «Нет, не тебя так пылко я люблю») set to the words of Lermontov. There is also a contemporary singer called Nikolai Shishkin.

== Songs ==
- "Listen if you wish" «Слушайте, если хотите».
- "Bright is the night" «Ночь светла». In the catalog of the National Library of Russia the only edition of this song attributed to "Shishkin" actually attributes to "Mikhail Shishkin", although this could just indicate the arranger, as with the song Sharaban ("Шарабан"). The lyricist is often miscatalogued in Russian sources as "M. Yazykov" (муз. Н. Шишкина, ст. М. Языкова = Николай Михайлович Языков) who lived half a century later. The actual author is Yakov Prigozhi (Яков Пригожий, 1840-1920), pianist at the Moscow restaurant Yar ("Яр"). Prigozhi made many arrangements of Gypsy melodies.
