= Aleksey Shishkin =

Russian composer

Aleksey Vasilyevich Shishkin (Russian: Алексей Васильевич Шишкин, Kursk?, fl. 1887) was a Russian Roma arranger and composer. He is the composer of the romance "No, it's not you I love so fervently" (Russian «Нет, не тебя так пылко я люблю») set to the words of Lermontov. He is one of several gypsy composer-arrangers called Shishkin, including Nikolai Shishkin, composer of songs such as "Listen if you wish" («Слушайте, если хотите»)
