= Timofey Prokofiev =

Soviet marine (1913–1944)

- Born: 2 February 1913; Lukianovo, Russian Empire
- Died: March 1944 (aged 30–31); Mykolaiv, Ukrainian SSR, Soviet Union (now Ukraine)
- Military career
- Allegiance: Soviet Union
- Branch: Soviet Navy
- Service years: 1942–1944
- Conflicts: World War II; Novorossiysk-Taman Operation; Kerch Landing Operations; Olshansky Landing
- Awards: Order of Lenin; Hero of the Soviet Union

Timofey Ilyich Prokofiev (Russian: Тимофей Ильич Прокофьев; 2 February 1913 – March 1944) was a Soviet marine of the Black Sea Fleet during World War II. He was posthumously awarded title Hero of the Soviet Union for his actions in the Olshansky Landing, the only openly Roma to ever receive the award.

== Biography ==
Timofey Prokofiev was born on 2 February 1913, in the village of Lukianovo, Ostashkovsky District, Tver Oblast, Russian Empire; into a family of peasants of Roma origin. After completing his primary education he went on to work as a sailor on the Moscow Canal.

On 22 June 1941 Germany invaded of the Soviet Union during World War II. Prokofiev enlisted in the Soviet Navy in January 1942 and was assigned to the 384th Naval Infantry Battalion of the Black Sea Fleet. Prokofiev fought in the Novorossiysk-Taman Operation and Kerch Landing Operations, where he was wounded twice. On the night of 26 March 1944, Prokofiev took part in the Olshansky Landing. The landing was a diversionary attack on the German rear at Nikolaev led by Senior Lieutenant Konstantin Olshansky. The 68 Soviet marines managed to capture several buildings in Nikolaev's port, repelling 18 German attacks within a span of two days. Prokofiev was among the marines who were killed in action.

Prokofiev was buried in a mass grave located on the 68 Marines Square in Nikolaev. On 25 April 1945, Prokofiev was posthumously awarded the title Hero of the Soviet Union along with the Order of Lenin, the only openly Roma person to have been awarded the title. A museum and a statue dedicated to the participants of the Olshansky Landing were created in Nikolaev during Soviet times.
