= Sovietsky Hotel =

Hotel in Moscow, Russia

Sovietsky
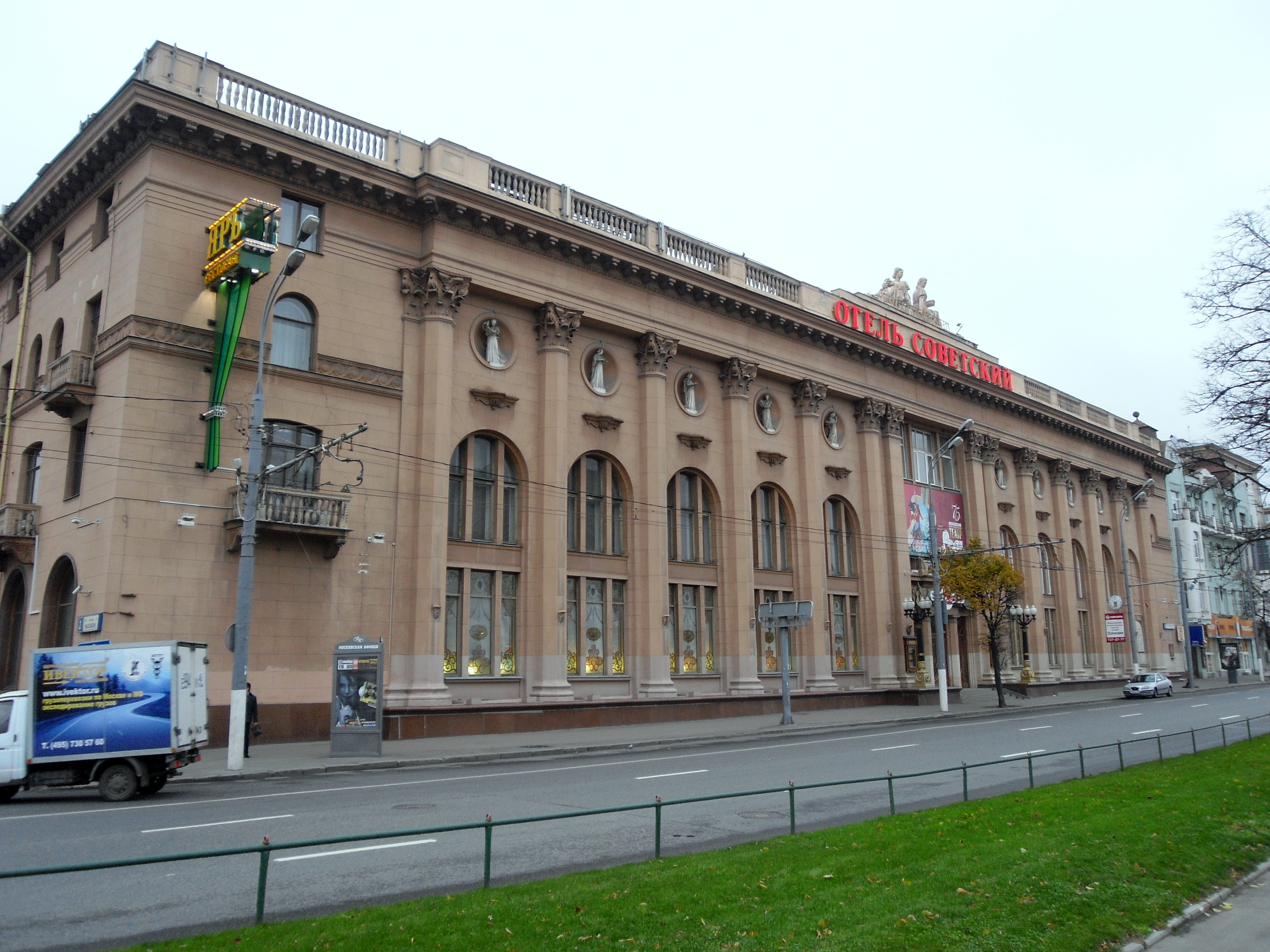
- Interactive map of the Sovietsky area

General information
- Location: Moscow, Russia, Leningradsky Ave, 32/2
- Coordinates: 55.7850°N 37.5693°E
- Opening: 1952

Other information
- Number of rooms: 100+
- Number of restaurants: Yar

Website
- www.sovietsky.ru/en/

The Sovietsky Hotel (Russian: гостиница «Сове́тская») is a historic Soviet-styled hotel built in 1952 and located in Moscow on Leningradsky Prospect.

== History ==
Sovietsky was built on Stalin's orders and opened in 1952. The architecture is based on Russian traditionalism and Soviet era styles. Yar, founded in 1826, one of the highest rated restaurants in Russia at the time, is located in Sovietsky Hotel after the hotel opened.

The hotel was often used to accommodate foreign diplomats and contains numerous hidden rooms used for spying.

In 2006, there were plans to rebrand the hotel as Ivanka Hotel after Ivanka Trump.
