= Cygan =

Cygan (Polish pronunciation: [ˈt͡sɨɡan]) is a surname which means gypsy in Polish. Notable people with the surname include:

- Bogusław Cygan (1964–2018), Polish footballer
- John Cygan (1954–2017), American actor
- Marian Cygan (1940–2026), Polish footballer and manager
- Mieczysław Cygan (1921–2006), Polish military commander
- Pascal Cygan (born 1974), French footballer
- Thierry Cygan (born 1975), French footballer
- Cygan, an android built in 1957

== See also ==
- Cygan, Łódź Voivodeship, Polish village
