= Yar (restaurant) =

Restaurants in Moscow, Russia

Coordinates: 55.78486284°N 37.56900774°E

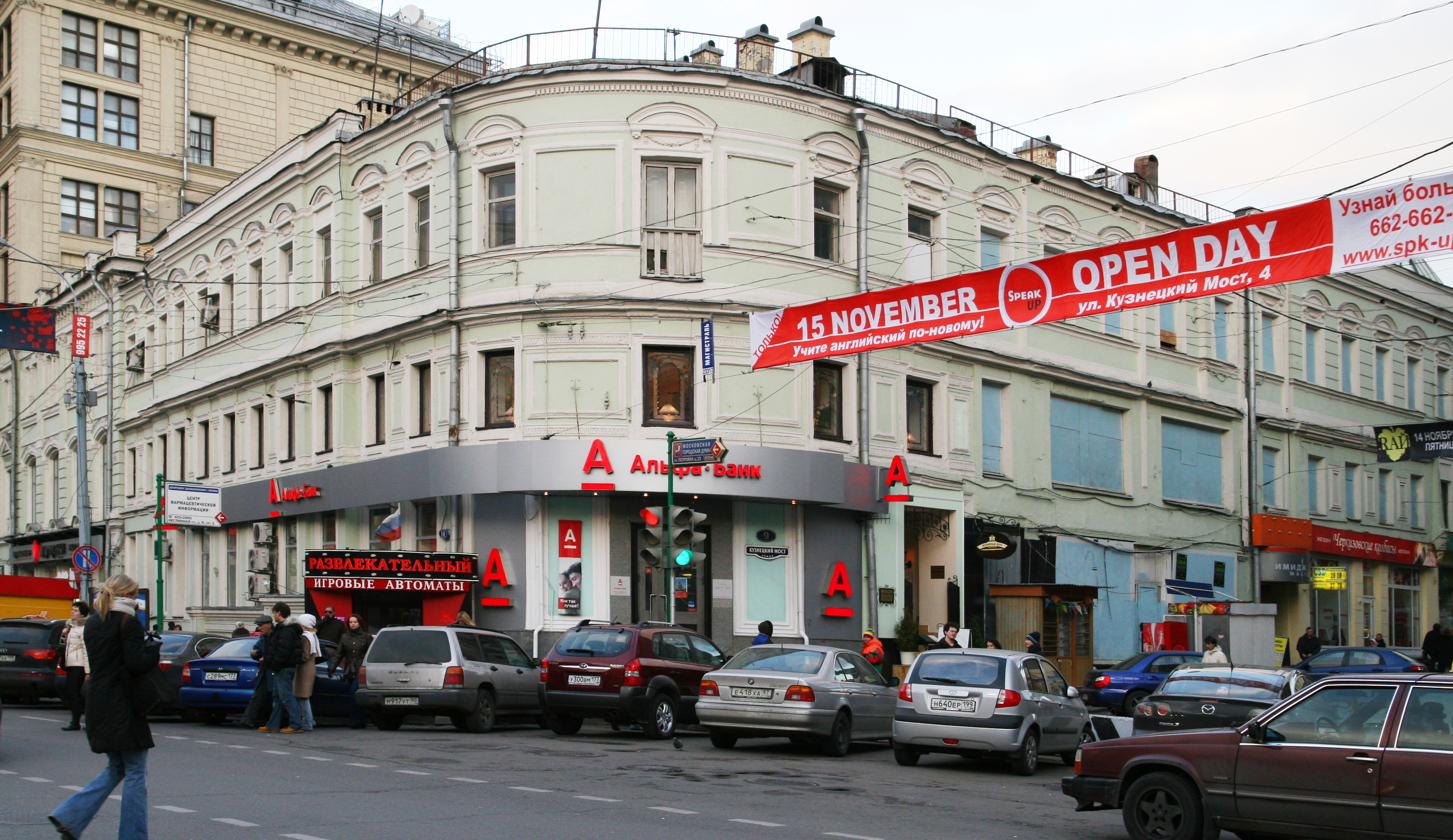
Moscow Kuznetsky Most Street No.9 in 2008, no longer a restaurant

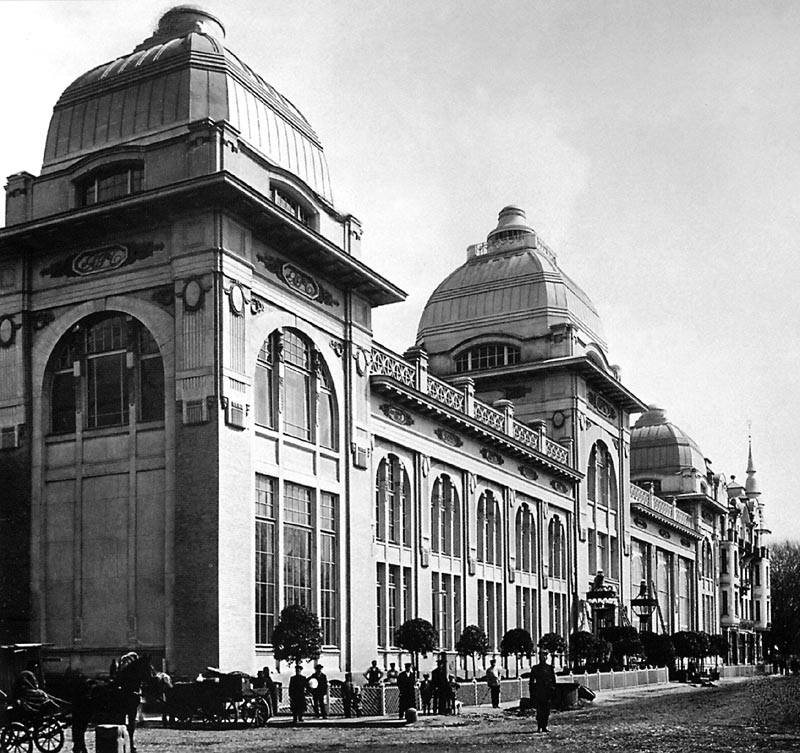
The second "Yar" opened 1913

The Yar (Russian: Яр) was the name of several restaurants and a theatre in 19th century Moscow frequented by Pushkin, Tolstoy, Chekhov, and Gorky. They were famous for the Sokolovsky gypsy choir. The original Yar ran from 1826 to 1925 on the street known as Kuznetsky Most. Its name comes from the Russian spelling of the surname of its owner, Tranquille Yard.

The second Yar (by the same owner) was opened on the St. Petersburg chaussée built by Adolf Erichson 1909–1913. The restaurant became popular among Russian elite. It was visited by Leonid Andreev, Konstantin Balmont, Anton Chekhov, Maxim Gorky, Alexander Kuprin, Savva Morozov, Grigory Rasputin, and Fyodor Shalyapin.

The current Yar is in the Sovietsky Hotel on Leningradsky Prospect (Moscow).
