= Romani people in Belarus =

Цыганы Беларусі
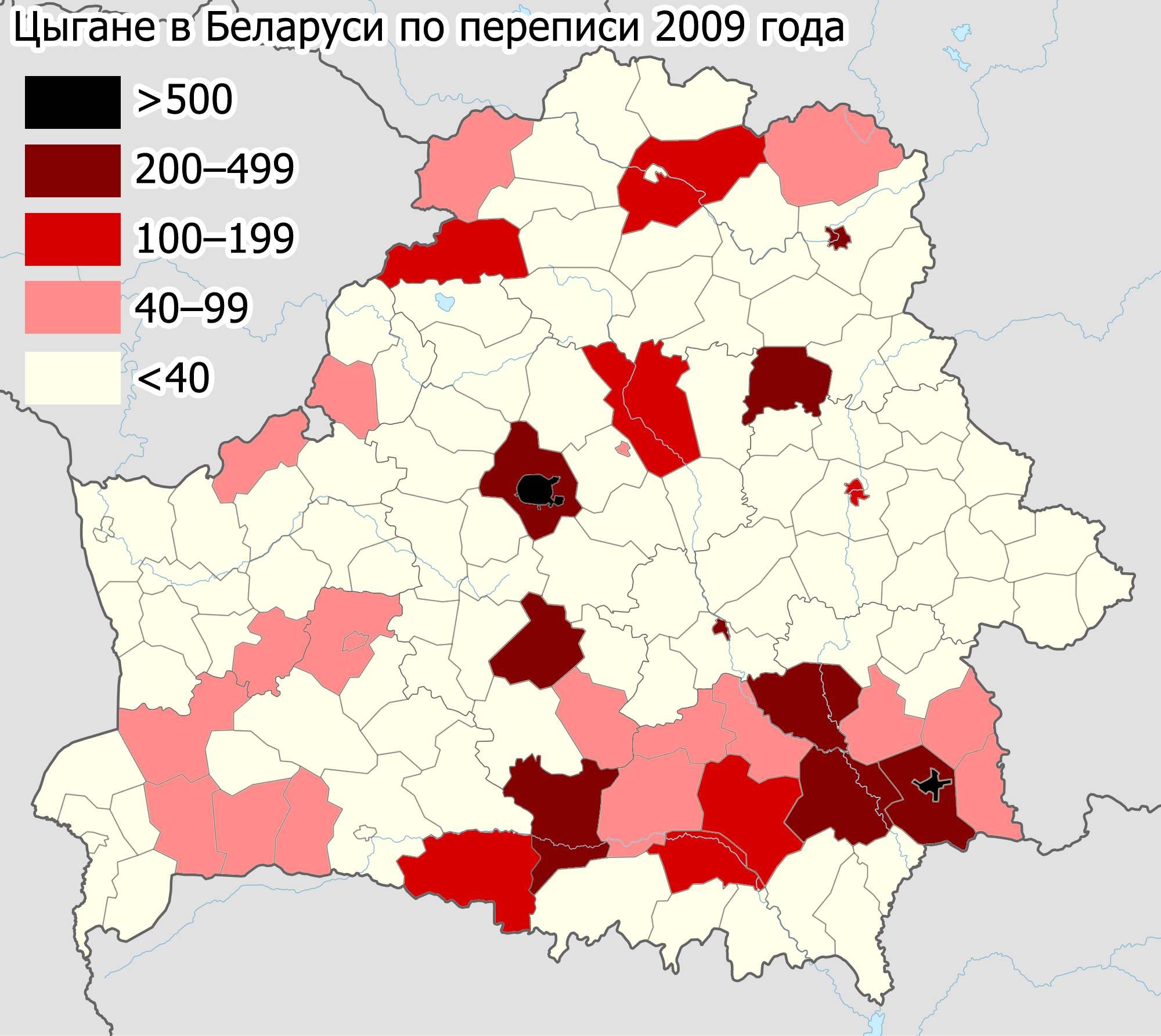

Total population
- 7,079 (2009, census)

Regions with significant populations
- Gomel, Mogilev and Minsk

Languages
- Belarusian, Russian, Baltic Romani

Religion
- Christianity (majority Eastern Orthodox)

The Romani people in Belarus (Note: Belarusian: Цыганы Беларусі, Cyhany Biełarusi; Russian: Белорусский цыгане, Belorusskij cygane) are Belarusian citizens of Romani descent. The Roma of Belarus, though relatively small compared to other Eastern European countries, have a history dating back over 500 years. Throughout Belarusian history, the Roma have often faced discrimination for various reasons, particularly under Nazi occupation, the Soviet Union, and the administration of Alexander Lukashenko.

== History ==
=== Origin ===
The Romani people originate in eastern India, in particular from around the modern-day state of Bihar. Romani roots in India remain visible in the modern day through the Romani language, which is part of the Indo-Aryan language family and shares many features with the Sanskrit and Prakrit languages. Genetic studies have also tied the Romani people to Rajsthan.

=== Grand Duchy of Lithuania ===
The first mention of the Romani people in Belarus is from 1501, with the privilege of Alexander Jagiellon, but it is believed that they may have been in the area by the early 15th century. In the Grand Duchy of Lithuania, Romani people lived a semi-nomadic life, but also had settled populations in urban centres, primarily Mir and Smarhonʹ, in which there was often violence between the Roma and other ethnic groups. In addition to these urban populations, numerous Romani villages existed in the region.

While treatment of the Roma in the Grand Duchy of Lithuania was liberal compared to Western Europe, anti-Romani attitudes in the government were still widespread. The Statutes of Lithuania banned Roma from holding public office, and the Sejm of the Polish–Lithuanian Commonwealth in 1586 attempted unsuccessfully to expel nomadic Roma. In 1624, the Sejm introduced the title of King of the Gypsies, which was elected by Roma communities and resided in Mir. The last person to hold the position was Jan Marcinkievič, and the title was abolished in 1788.

The Roma of modern-day Belarus were generally nomadic, settling only during the winter. Often, Roma lived on the outskirts of cities and often served as traders.

=== Russian Empire ===
Following the partitions of Poland, the territory of modern-day Belarus became part of the Russian Empire. During this period, multiple unsuccessful attempts were made to settle the Roma, including attempts to force them to live as peasants. In 1812, restrictions on Roma settlement were abolished, bringing them onto the same standards as other citizens in the Russian Empire.

=== Soviet Union and World War II ===
The early days of the Soviet Union brought positive changes for the Belarusian Roma. In 1927, the first Romani kolkhoz in the Soviet Union, "New Life", was established in Vitebsk District. This was followed by another in Zhlobin District, in addition to a seven-year school in Vitebsk including Romani-language textbooks and education. However, these changes were greatly upset by Operation Barbarossa and the Porajmos. Many Roma were killed, and many others fled to the forests of Belarus, joining the Belarusian partisans.

In 1956, the decree "On the inclusion of Roma engaged in vagrancy" was adopted, leading to the forceful settlement of the majority of the remaining Belarusian Roma community. Multiple settlements were established, including Paŭnočny in Zelʹva District and Kalodziščy and Ratamka outside Minsk.

== Subgroups ==
Various subgroups of Roma live on the territory of what is now Belarus.

- Belaruska Roma
  consider themselves indigenous, are divided into different territorial and tribal subgroups (titles): minčani, gomielcy, vitebščuki, lipiency, chaladore, etc.; the vast majority speak the Belarusian-Lithuanian Romani dialect, which is very close to the dialect of Ruska Roma (North Russian Romani).
- Kalderash
- Litovska Roma (Lithuanian Roma)
- Lotfitka Roma (Latvian Roma)
- Polska Roma subgroups in Belarus:
  - Berniki
  - Bezhantsi
  - Korsaki
  - Udeiki
- Ruska Roma (Russian Roma)
- Servitka Roma

== Current status ==
Since Belarus has become independent, the living conditions of the Romani community has remained poor, and education remains minimal; in 2009, only 28 Roma had graduated from higher education, as per the census. As of the 2009 census, 7,079 Roma live in Belarus, but it has been commonly claimed that the population is higher, with some estimates going as high as 60,000. The largest number of Roma is in Gomel Region, at 2,501 people.

Under President Alexander Lukashenko, government suppression of Roma is widespread. Approximately 80 percent of Belarusian Roma have been imprisoned at one time in their lives, and racial profiling by police is common. The Belarusian Ministry of Internal Affairs reportedly has unofficial protocols which deliberately target Roma. Following the death of police officer Jaŭhien Patapovič in Mahilioŭ, all Roma homes were searched and more than a hundred Roma were detained on suspicion of murdering him.

Employment discrimination is also common; many Romani Belarusians are prevented from holding jobs, both in private and state-owned enterprises, and negative stereotypes remain widespread among non-Romani Belarusians.
