= Edward Dębicki =

Polish musician

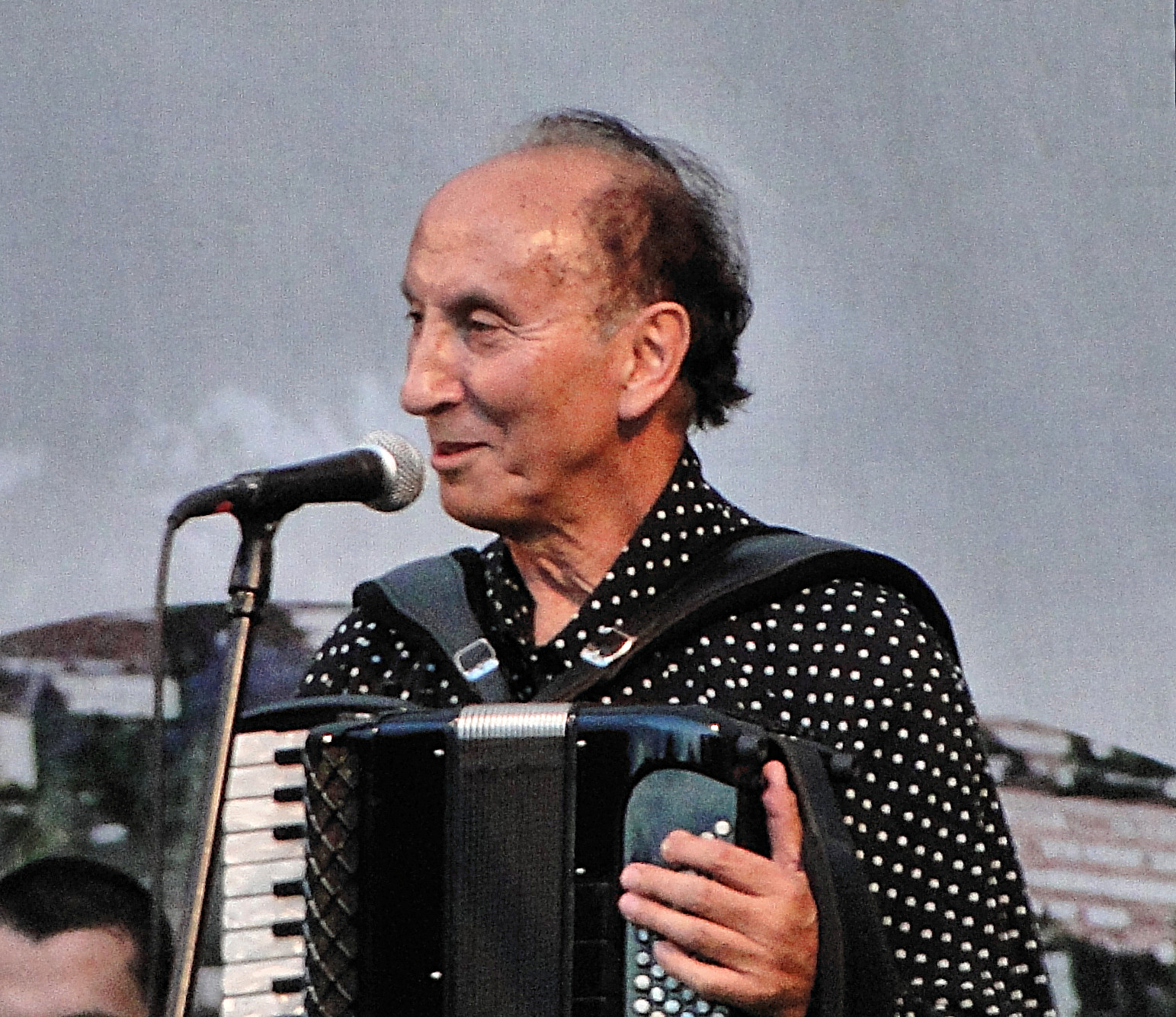

Background information
- Birth name: Edward Krzyżanowski
- Born: March 4, 1935 (age 90); Kałusz, Second Polish Republic (present-day Kalush, Ukraine)
- Genres: Folk
- Occupation(s): Poet, musician, composer
- Instrument: Accordion

Edward Dębicki (born Edward Krzyżanowski, 4 March 1935) is a Polish Romani poet, musician and composer. His work is connected with the Romani community and its cultural, itinerant and music traditions.

Dębicki was born in Kałusz (Kalush), in present-day Ukraine, the son of the Romani musicians Władysław Krzyżanowski and Franciszka Raczkowska. Much of his youth was spent travelling in his parents' caravan in the border regions between Poland and Ukraine. In 1953 he attended music schools in Gorzów Wielkopolski and Zielona Góra. In 1955 he founded, and became the director of, the music group Kcham (Sun) which later became Terno. He has taken part in accordion competitions in Kielce and Wrocław.

Dębicki is the author of a book of poetry, Under the naked sky ('Teł nango bolipen' (Romani) or 'Pod gołym niebem' (Polish), 1993), and the novel Bird of the dead ('Ptak umarłych', 2004) which describes the experiences of a Romani family in Wołyń during World War II. He has written approximately 200 songs.

Since the 1960s Dębicki has been the director of the musical group Terno (Młody) in Gorzów Wielkopolski.

At present Dębicki lives in Gorzów Wielkopolski, Poland.
