= Bergitka Roma =

Languages
- Carpathian Romani

Bergitka Roma or Carpathian Roma (also "Goral Gypsies" in some works) are a Romani ethnic sub-group, living mostly in Poland in the Goral Lands. They were one of the first, if not the first, group of Roma to migrate to Poland, mostly from the territories of the Kingdom of Hungary, through the Carpathian Mountains, sometime during the 15th century. The name Bergitka (sometimes Bergare) is actually the term for the group used by other Roma groups, originating in German Berg, meaning "mountain". The members of the group refer to themselves simply as "Roma" or "amare Roma" (that is: "our Roma").

Some Bergitka communities also exist in Slovakia, close to the Polish-Slovak border.

Traditional occupations of Bergitka Roma have been iron working and music.

== Language ==
Their dialect of the Roma language, Carpathian Romani, contains many loan words from Polish, Slovak and Hungarian and it has also preserved some grammar and tense structure of Hungarian. Unlike many other Romani dialects of Eastern and Central Europe, it lacks any influence from German.

== History ==
Bergitka Roma are non-nomadic and have lived a settled existence since at least the 18th century. For this reason, and because their interpretation of traditional Roma laws and customs, Romanipen, is regarded as lax by other groups of Roma, other Roma accord them a low social status. Bergitka Roma in turn regard non-Bergitka Roma as of low social status and as "inauthentic Roma".

Until World War II they lived mostly in the rural countryside of the Carpathian highlands, mainly the Goral Lands, but after the war began moving to larger cities of Malopolska, such as Kraków, Tarnów, and Rzeszów. Many of them also moved to the Recovered Territories in the west of Poland. Currently they live mostly in the Subcarpathian, Lesser Poland, Silesian and Lower Silesian voivodeships.

== See also ==
- Romani people in Poland
