= Mława riot =

1991 riot in Mława, Poland

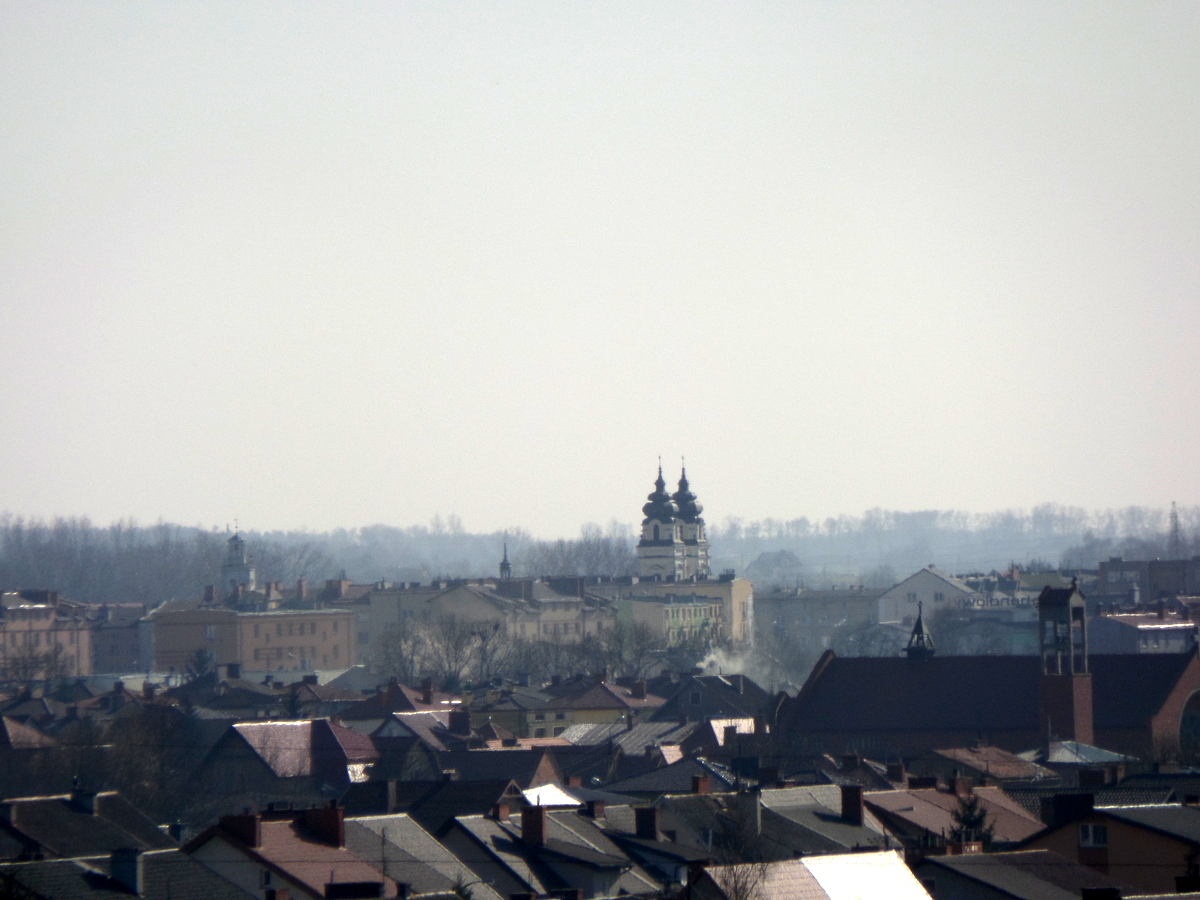
- Photograph of the Mława town centre
- Date: 26–27 June 1991
- Location: Mława, Poland
- Type: Ethnic conflict
- Cause: Killing of a Polish pedestrian struck along with his companion in a hit-and-run by a Romani male driver
- Target: Roma residents
- Property damage: 17 houses of Roma residents seriously damaged, four houses and nine apartments vandalized
- Arrests: 21
- Convicted: 17

The Mława riot, or Mława incident, or Mława pogrom (Polish: Pogrom mławski), was an urban riot which occurred 26–27 June 1991 in Mława, Poland. After a deadly hit-and-run accident perpetrated by a Roma man, about 200 youths ransacked and burned the houses of local Romani people. While no injuries were reported, 40% of the residences inhabited by Roma in the town were badly damaged.

Many of the perpetrators of the riot were arrested, and some were sentenced to jail time. The riot was cited as an instance of the post-communist resurgence of anti-Romani racism in Poland.

== Background ==
The immediate cause of the riot was a hit-and-run accident just before midnight on 23 June 1991 on the pedestrian crossing at Piłsudskiego and Zuzanny Morawskiej streets. A speeding luxury car driven by seventeen-year-old Roman Packowski (who was of Romani ethnicity) hit and seriously injured two young pedestrians, killing one of them. The driver fled the scene and hid from the police. He was later convinced by the Roma elders to turn himself in. Soon after the accident the local radio station informed that the driver had fled the scene. This claim was in fact true; however, the driver fled after people who witnessed the accident already identified his vehicle. For the next two days the driver and his car were hidden among the local Roma community.

The accident victim who died from his injuries was 21-year-old Jaroslaw Pinczewski. The mayor of Mława, Adam Chmieliński, informed that he died at the scene. The other victim, 17-year old Katarzyna Zakrzewska, suffered permanent physical incapacitation.

== Riot ==
Two days later, some sixty Mława youths targeted and destroyed the house of a local Roma leader. The assailants quickly grew in number and began burning other Roma homes. Estimates put the number of participants in the violence from one hundred to two hundred. Some Roma found protection at the local police station. Others hid at the homes of their Polish friends. A total of 17 Roma houses were seriously damaged and further four houses and nine apartments were vandalized, but no members of the Roma community were hurt. The crowd apparently targeted wealthier Roma and their estates. The crowd shouted slogans such as "Poland for the Poles". The police brought in additional forces and imposed a curfew.

Afterwards, 21 persons were brought to court, and 17 were sentenced for up to 30 months in prison.

== Reaction ==
A former political dissident Adam Michnik writing in Gazeta Wyborcza castigated the police and political authorities for their alleged inaction. The paper also demanded 'official action against ethnic hatred'. As a result, a number of political parties and academic institutions belatedly condemned the pogrom.

The eruption of ethnic violence at Mława in 1991 has been described as 'the renewal of anti-Gypsy racism in Poland' and is linked to a significant rise in Polish Roma asylum applications in the United Kingdom and Sweden.

However the fact the rioters selectively attacked only the wealthy Roma houses (called "belveders") supports the opinion that the riot was triggered by economic rather than nationalistic factors.

The President of the Roma Society of Poland, Roman Kwiatkowski informed that the relations between the local Roma and their Polish neighbours twenty years after the fact are good.
