= Terno =

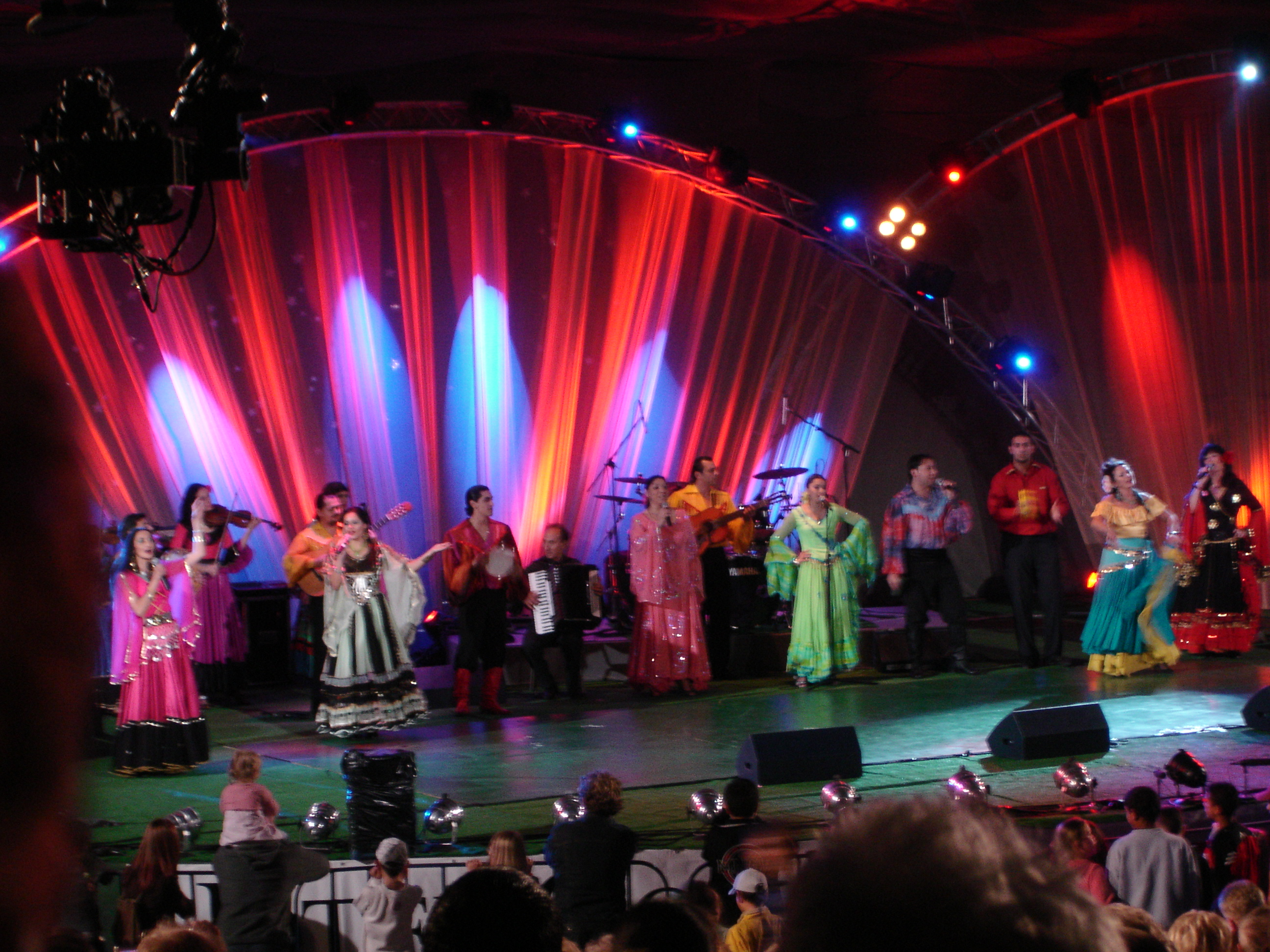
Terno music collective, with Dębicki playing the accordion

Terno (English: "[the] Young"), is a Polish Romani music collective founded in 1953. Originally known as Kcham, Terno was founded by Romani musician Edward Dębicki. It has performed in Poland and around Europe.
