= Ruska Roma =

Romani ethnic group of Russia and Belarus

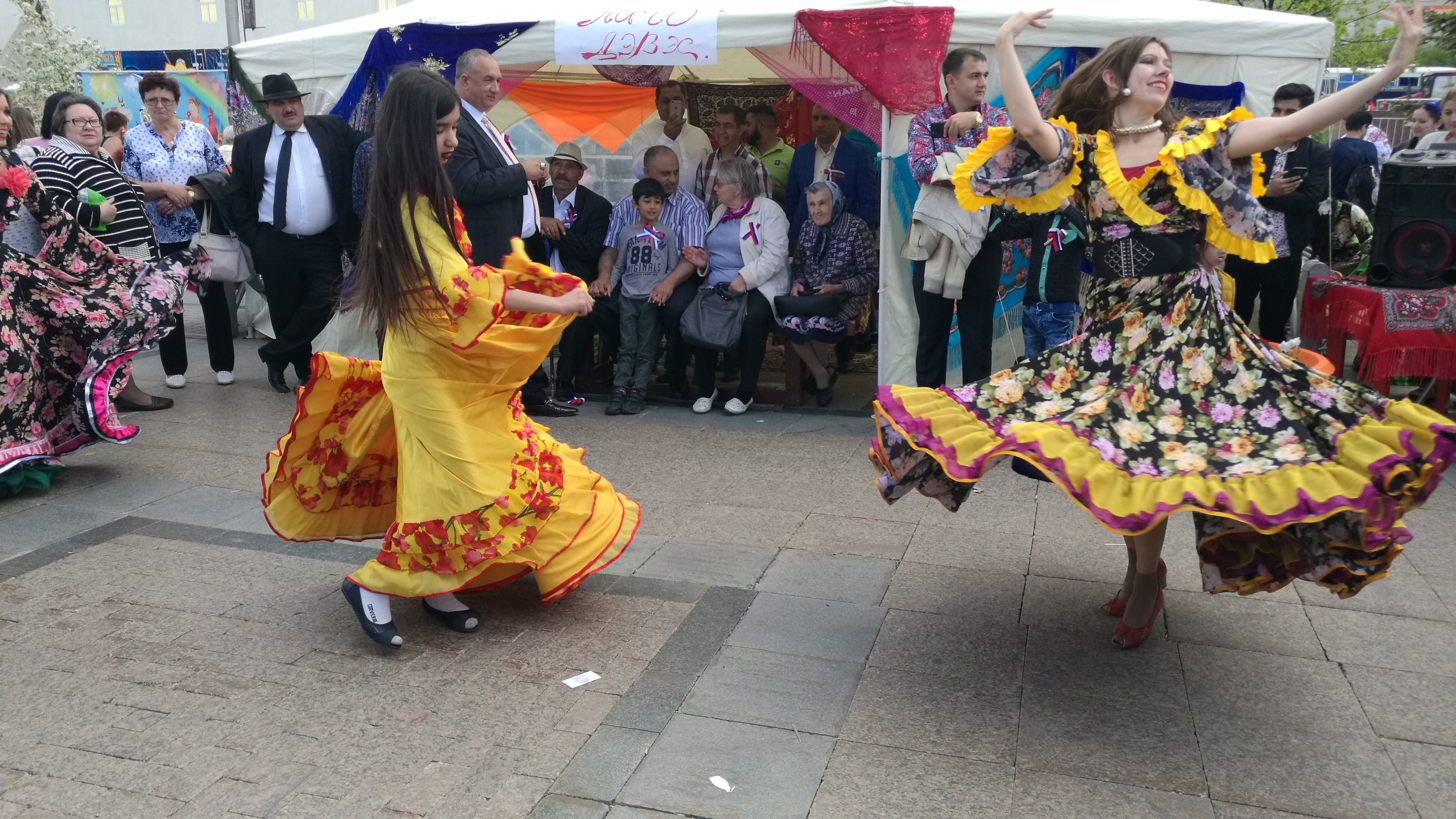
Romani festival in Tyumen, 2018

The Ruska Roma (Руска Рома), also known as North Russian Gypsies (севернорусские цыгане) or Khaladytka Roma (Халадытка Рома; lit. 'Roma Soldiers'), are the largest subgroup of Romani people in Russia and Belarus, with smaller remnants of the group living in Ukraine, Latvia, Poland, the United States, France, and Canada. They formed in the Northwestern part of the Russian Empire from the Polska Roma who immigrated to the country in the 18th century.

Ruska Roma are divided into territorial subgroups, whose names come from the locality. For example, Pskovska Roma (from Pskov), Smolyaki (from Smolensk), Siberyaki (Siberian), Zabaykaltsi (Transbaikalian) and Bobri (beavers). Furthermore, Ruska Roma are related to Belaruska Roma: they have a common origin and were traditionally called Chaładytka Roma.

The Ruska Romani language contains Russian, Polish, and German lexicon, as well as some Russian and Ukrainian grammar. Most Ruska Roma are Orthodox Christians.

== Role in Russian history ==
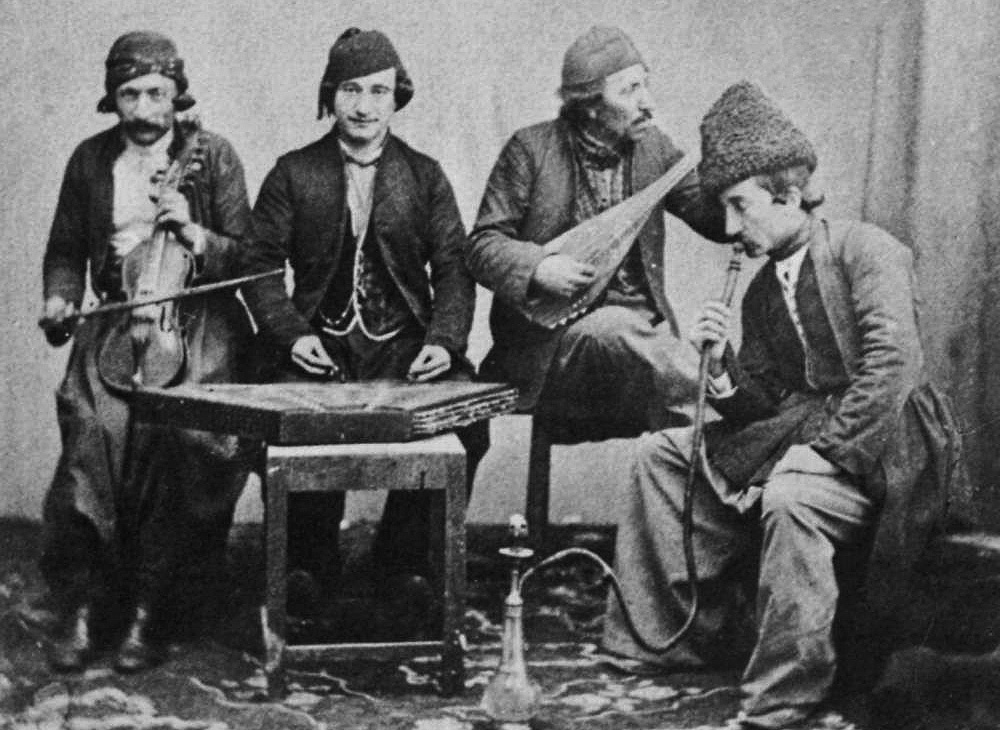
Romani musicians in the Russian empire, 1865

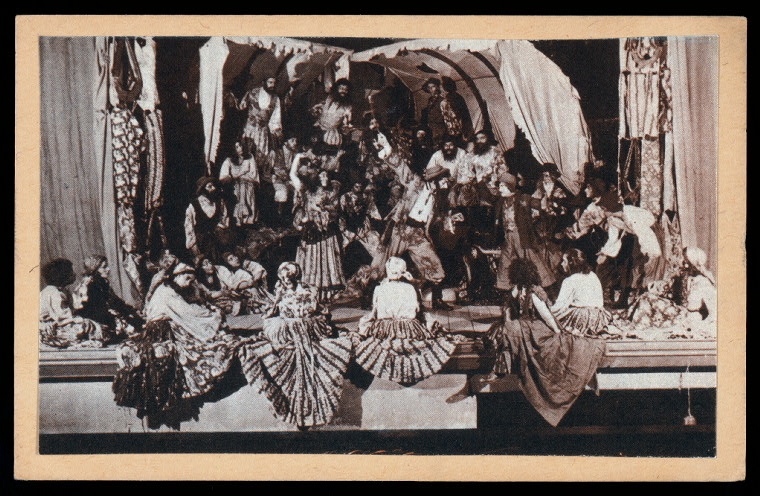
Moscow's Romen Theatre

Judging by the language of Russian Roma, their ancestors spent time in Germany and Poland before coming to the East Slavic territories. Sources start mentioning Roma on the territory of Russia from the beginning of the 18th century. For instance, Scottish traveler John Bell wrote about Roma arrivals from Poland, sent away from the Tobolsk region in 1721.

Arrivals became involved in entertainment, playing and singing at large celebrations. During the 19th century, Russian Roma living in Moscow and Saint Petersburg created Romani choirs, which became popular among the Russian urban population. Nomadic Russian Roma engaged in horse dealing and fortune telling.

A drastic change in the life of nomadic Russian Roma took place in 1956 when a Soviet government decree banned Roma from their nomadic lifestyle. They were forced to settle in houses. Nowadays Russian Roma often live dispersed, but they tend to settle amongst other Roma to form a sense of belonging. Russian Roma prefer to live in private houses, but it is not uncommon for a Russian Romani family to live in a flat.

== Notable individuals ==
- Nikolai Slichenko – Russian singer
- Nikolai Shishkin – Russian theatre personality
- Valentina Ponomaryova – singer, theatre actor
- Timofey Prokofiev – marine infantryman, Hero of the Soviet Union

== See also ==
- Kalderash – Subgroup of the Romani people
- Lovari – Subgroup of the Romani people
- Servitka Roma
- Mugat Ghorbati – Branch of Ghorbati people erroneously seen as related to Roma

== Literature ==
- Smirnova-Seslavinskaya, M. V.; Tsvetkov, G. N. (2011). Антропология социокультурного развития цыганского населения России [Anthropology of the Sociocultural Development of the Roma Population of Russia] (PDF) (in Russian). Moscow: Federal Institute for Education Development.
