= Olga Shishkina (physicist) =

Russian fluid dynamicist (physicist)

Olga Shishkina is a Russian fluid dynamicist (physicist) known for her research in fluid mechanics, including turbulence, Rayleigh–Bénard convection, and the structure and motion of boundary layers. She is a researcher in the Laboratory for Fluid Physics, Pattern Formation and Biocomplexity of the Max Planck Institute for Dynamics and Self-Organization in Göttingen, Germany, where she leads the "Theory of Turbulent Convection" group.

== Education and career ==
Shishkina earned a diploma in mathematics at Moscow State University in 1987, and in 1990 defended a doctoral thesis in scientific computation at the Moscow Technical University of Communications and Informatics.

After working for three years as a lecturer at the Rybinsk State Aviation Technical University, she returned to Moscow State University, where she worked as a researcher in computational mathematics from 1994 until 2002, when she moved to the Institute of Aerodynamics and Flow Technology of the German Aerospace Center in Göttingen. She earned a habilitation in fluid mechanics in 2009 through Technische Universität Ilmenau, and a second habilitation in 2014 in mathematics at the University of Göttingen.

In 2014 she moved from the Institute of Aerodynamics and Flow Technology to the Max Planck Institute for Dynamics and Self-Organization as a Heisenberg Fellow of the German Research Foundation, and in 2019 she became group leader for theory of turbulent convection at the Max Planck Institute.

== Recognition ==
In 2020, Shishkina was named a Fellow of the American Physical Society (APS), after a nomination from the APS Division of Fluid Dynamics, "for seminal contributions to the understanding of thermally driven turbulent convection, including Rayleigh-Bénard convection, rotating Rayleigh-Bénard convection, and horizontal and vertical convection, both by numerical simulations and by theory".
