= Mikhail Shishkin (footballer) =

Russian footballer

Personal information
- Full name: Mikhail Valeryevich Shishkin
- Date of birth: 4 September 1980 (age 46)
- Height: 1.75 m (5 ft 9 in)
- Position: Defender

Youth career
- FC Lokomotiv Moscow

Senior career*
Years	Team	Apps	(Gls)
1998–2000	FC Lokomotiv-2 Moscow	78	(0)
2001	FC Lokomotiv Moscow	0	(0)
2001	→ FC Metallurg Krasnoyarsk (loan)	13	(0)
2002	FC Lokomotiv Moscow	0	(0)
2002	FC Volgar-Gazprom Astrakhan	7	(0)
2003–2005	FC Zhenis	72	(1)
2006–2007	FC Atyrau	33	(0)
2007–2008	FC Astana	28	(1)
2009	FC FSA Voronezh	29	(2)
2010	FC Kaluga	29	(0)
2011–2014	FC Spartak Kostroma	80	(2)
- * Club domestic league appearances and goals

Mikhail Valeryevich Shishkin (Russian: Михаил Валерьевич Шишкин; born 4 September 1980) is a former Russian professional footballer.

== Club career ==
He played two seasons in the Russian Football National League for FC Metallurg Krasnoyarsk and FC Volgar-Gazprom Astrakhan.
