= Servurya Roma =

Languages
- Vlax Romani (Servicko)

Related ethnic groups
- Other Ukrainian and Russian Romani, Serbian Romani, Romanian Romani

Servurya (Ukrainian Серви, Russian Сэрвы) is a subgroup of Romani. They formed as a group in Ukraine, where their ancestors had come from Serbia.

== History ==
Servitka Roma were formed in Ukraine from Romanian and/or Serbian Roma who immigrated to the country in the early seventeenth century. In addition to Ukraine, they are disbursed in the European part of Russia. Ritualism is partially borrowed from the Slavic population.

Traditionally, they were engaged in trade and exchange of horses, blacksmithing, fortune-telling. For some time, young Servitka served in the Cossack troops.

Today, the Servitka are one of the most educated Roma ethnic groups with a wide range of professions. Noticeably, they distinguished themselves in the musical field. Servitka are often confused with chaladite roma; in the artistic environment, these two ethnic groups are similar. In the publications of Ilona Mahotina and Janusz Panchenko, six subgroups of Servitka are distinguished, which have some differences in language and culture: Tavrichans, Zadnipr'ans, Poltavans, Voronezh (Xandžar'a) and Volga Servitka and Kylmysh. These studies also note the so-called city Servitka, whose ancestors were sedentary, at least from the end of the 19th century. and is currently the most integrated Roma group.

== Well-known Servurya ==
- Eugene Hütz, musician
- Nickolai Slichenko, theatre and cinema actor, Romen Theatre director
- Sasha Kolpakov, guitarist

== See also ==
- Romani people in Ukraine
- Ruska Roma
- Polska Roma
