= Romani people in Ukraine =

Roma in Ukraine
Romane manusha andi Ukraina (Romani)

Total population
- 47,587 (2001 census), est. 400,000

Regions with significant populations
- Zakarpattia region and Odesa region

Languages
- Russian, Ukrainian, Para-Romani

Religion
- Eastern Orthodoxy, Islam, Romani mythology

Related ethnic groups
- Romani people in Belarus, Romani people in Russia

The presence of Romani people in Ukraine, locally referred to as the Tsyhany (Ukrainian: цигани [ˈtsɪɦɐnɪ]), was first documented in the early 15th century. The Romani maintained their social organizations and folkways, shunning non-Romani contacts, education and values, often as a reaction to anti-Romani attitudes and persecution. They adopted the language and faith of the dominant society, being Orthodox in most of Ukraine, Catholic in Western Ukraine and Zakarpattia Oblast, and Muslim in Crimea.

== History ==
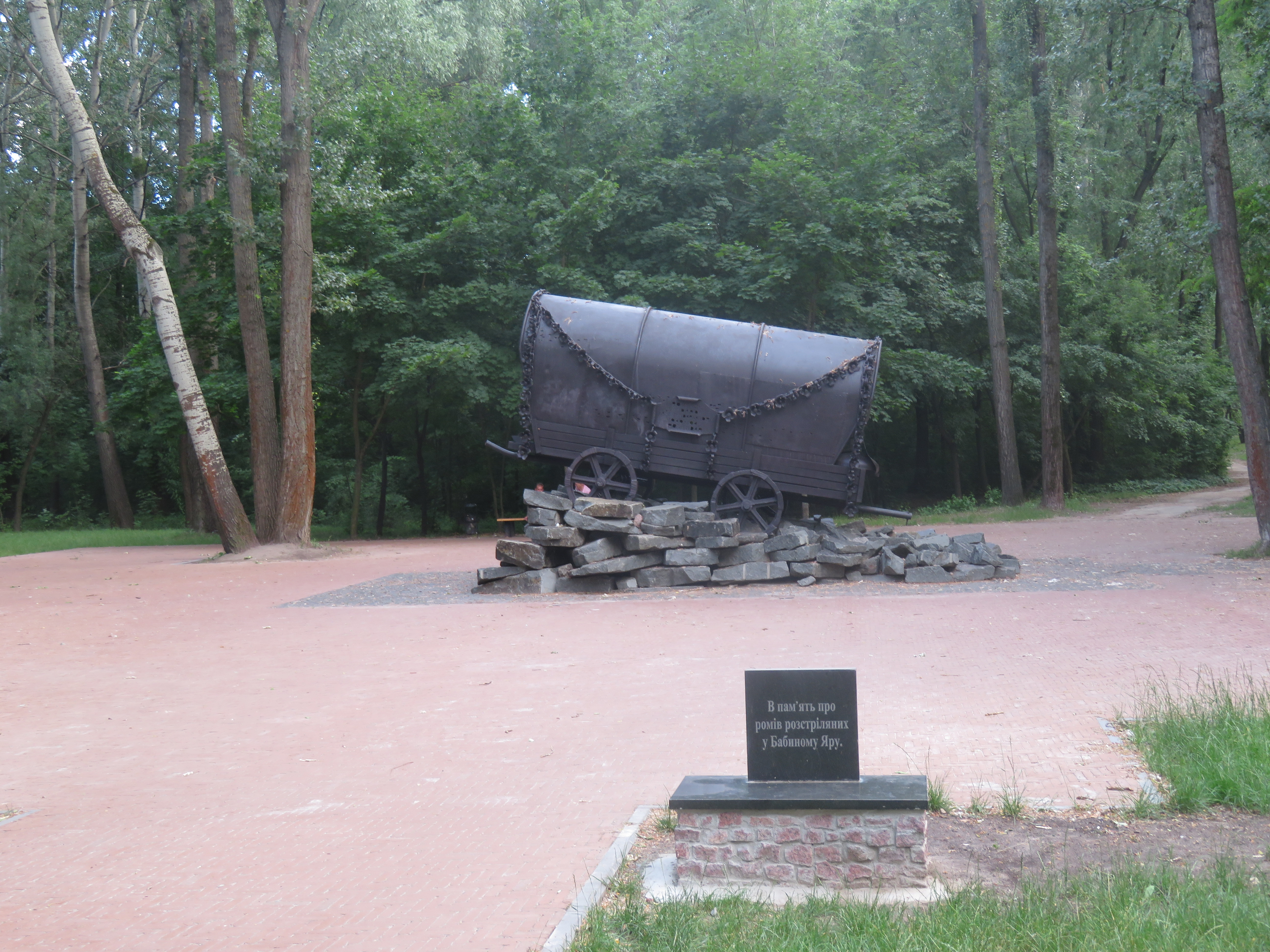
Monument to Roma Murdered at Babi Yar.

The first recorded reference to Romani people in Ukraine goes back to the 15th century. Ukrainian Roma made a living through nomadic trades like blacksmithing, bartering, veterinary services, metalworking, and music.

=== Origin ===
The Romani people originate from northern India, presumably from the northwestern Indian states Rajasthan and Punjab.

The linguistic evidence has indisputably shown that roots of Romani language lie in India: the language has grammatical characteristics of Indian languages and shares with them parts of the basic lexicon, for example, body parts or daily routines.

More exactly, Romani shares the basic lexicon with Hindi and Punjabi. It shares many phonetic features with Marwari, while its grammar is closest to Bengali.

Genetic findings in 2012 suggest the Romani originated in northwestern India and migrated as a group. According to a genetic study in 2012, the ancestors of present scheduled tribes and scheduled caste populations of northern India, traditionally referred to collectively as the Ḍoma, are the likely ancestral populations of modern European Roma.

In February 2016, during the International Roma Conference, the Indian Minister of External Affairs stated that the people of the Roma community were children of India. The conference ended with a recommendation to the Government of India to recognize the Roma community spread across 30 countries as a part of the Indian diaspora.

=== 20th century ===
In the regions occupied by Germany, the initial phase of killings took place in 1941, during which the Wehrmacht and SS police units shot and killed traveling Ukrainian Roma traders they came across. Unlike the organized deportations to death camps that occurred in Western Europe, the Roma in Ukraine were mostly executed immediately by Nazi mobile killing squads (Einsatzgruppen) along with local collaborators.

=== 2022 Russian invasion of Ukraine ===
During the 2022 invasion of Ukraine, Roma people suffered since the often lack of civil status documentation held off their access to humanitarian assistance. Several sources report denying refugees access to European countries. EU Agency for Fundamental Rights (FRA) called for special attention to Roma seeking sanctuary.

The previous discouragement of the education of Roma girls hit them harder after the war disturbance in the education system. Romani Ukrainians are also fighting Russian soldiers in Liubymivka. Despite being part of a marginalized minority, hundreds of Roma volunteered to fight for the Ukrainian army and were awarded.

== Demographics ==
- Census 1897: 12,000 Romani in Ukraine (without Galicia and Transcarpathia who comprise the highest Ukrainian Romani population)
- Census 1920: 60,000 Romani in Ukrainian SSR (without Galicia and Transcarpathia)
- Census 1959: 28,000 Romani in Ukrainian SSR
- Census 1970: 30,100 Romani in Ukrainian SSR.
- Census 1979: 34,500 Romani in Ukrainian SSR
- Census 2001: 47,587 Romani in Ukraine. The estimate of the World Romani Union and the Council of Europe is considerably higher. In 2006 the Romani organizations estimated the number at over 400,000 persons.

== Culture ==
Gypsy punk represents a prominent Romani musical genre throughout Ukraine, synthesizing punk rock elements with the nomadic heritage and bohemian artistic sensibilities characteristic of Romani communities.

Ukrainian Romani cuisine is rich in spices, red pepper, and tomatoes. On Sundays, the Ukrainian Romani table often features chicken, cutlets, and *holubtsi* (cabbage rolls)—dishes that are common in the Transcarpathia region. Baked goods are also eaten by Ukrainian Roma, especially *marikla*, a traditional Romani bread in Ukraine. It is simple to prepare, requiring only flour, water, a little baking soda, and oil. This Romani bread is baked on a baking sheet, though in the past, it was baked on a stove.

== Sub-groups ==
The Muslim Roma migrated from Central Asia in the 17th and 18th century to Crimea peninsula.

- Krimi (Крими), intermingled with Crimean Tatars. Further sub-groups include Audzhi (аюджі), Gurbety (гурбети), Mukani and others. During World War II Nazis killed 800 Krimi Roma in Simferopol. After the Nazi occupation, Stalin ordered all Crimean Tatars and Crimean Romani to be deported to Central Asia as "special settlers" in 1944, further devastating their community.
  - Gurbeti: The gypsy communities in Crimea in the 19th century were divided by "Yerli" (Yerli) and "Chingene" (Nomad). The Gurbeti (sometimes called Turkmen), lived mainly in the towns and steppe regions. They traded horses and products made out of horse meat (such as the popular chir-chir-byurek). The Krimurja in Crimea incorporated small numbers of Gurbeti through marriage, although in the 19th century they are listed as a separate group of "locals". Their small number likely prevented them from an own community. Their Romani language and nomadic lifestyle determined their separation to the Daifa, and their joining to the Krimurja. In spite of intermarriage between the Gurbeti and Krimurja, a distinct origin is remembered, and an internal separation to some extent has been preserved. Some in Crimea suggest that the "chingene" deny their gypsy origin and declare as Crimean Tatars.
- Carpathian Romani The largest number of Roma is in the city of Mukachevo (1.4%), in Vynohradiv (0.8%), Berehove (4.1%) and Uzhgorod (4.1%) districts of the Transcarpathian region.
  - Kalderash (Hungarian name for Kotlyary; Zakarpattia),
  - Servica Roma (in Zakarpattia from Slovakia),
  - Ungriko Roma (in Zakarpattia from Hungary)
  - Chaladitka Roma (descended from Polish Roma)
- Ruska Roma (northern Ukraine),
- Servitka Roma (Serby, southern and central Ukraine, from Serbia), Servitka live scattered in small groups among representatives of other ethnic groups. They are characterized by living in large cities of Zhytomyr and Chernihiv regions (cities of Chernihiv, Zhytomyr, Korosten, and Malyn).
- Lovari (central Ukraine), most representatives of the Lovari group have their compact settlements in Zhytomyr (Bohunia district), Teterivka village of Zhytomyr district and in the city of Malyn.
- Kelmysh, In the city of Bila Tserkva lives a group of gypsies-kelmish. In the Cherkasy region, kelmish live not in cities, but in gypsy villages that emerged in the 60s of the XX century. The main region of settlement is the town of Smila and its surroundings.

== Gallery ==
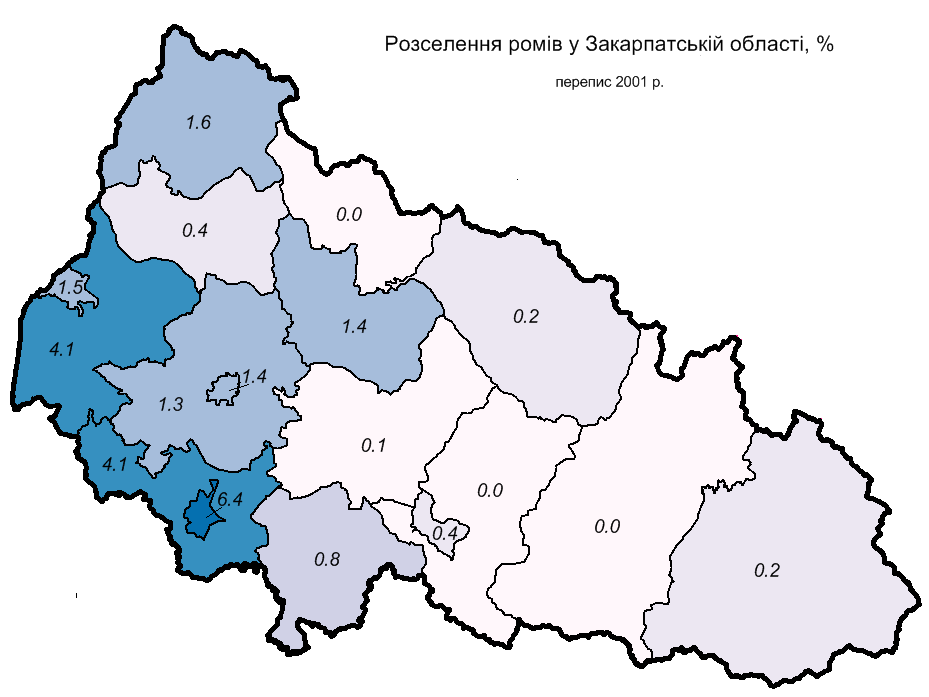
The Romani minority in Zakarpattia Oblast (census 2001)

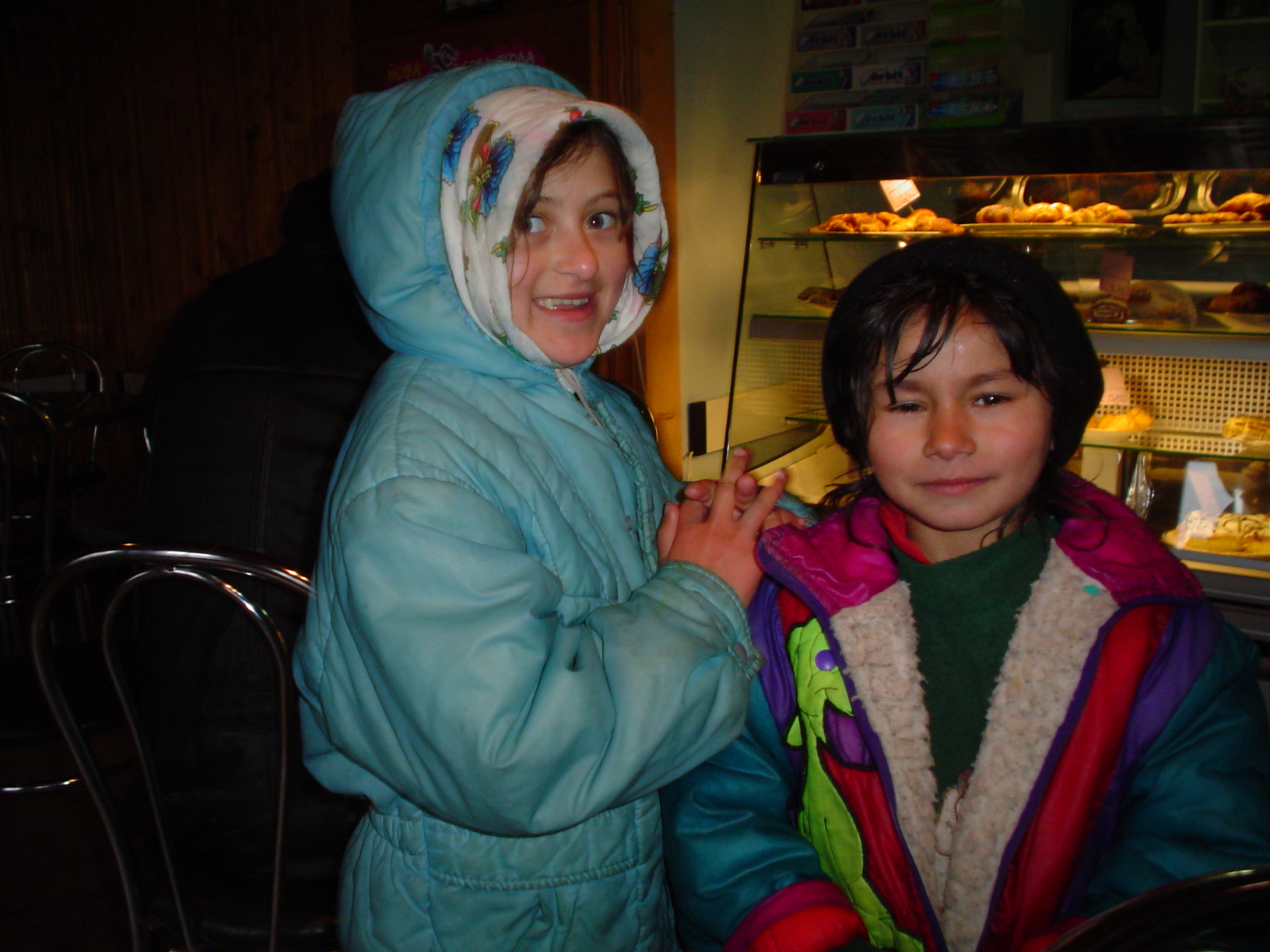
Romani children in Dubove, Zakarpattia Oblast

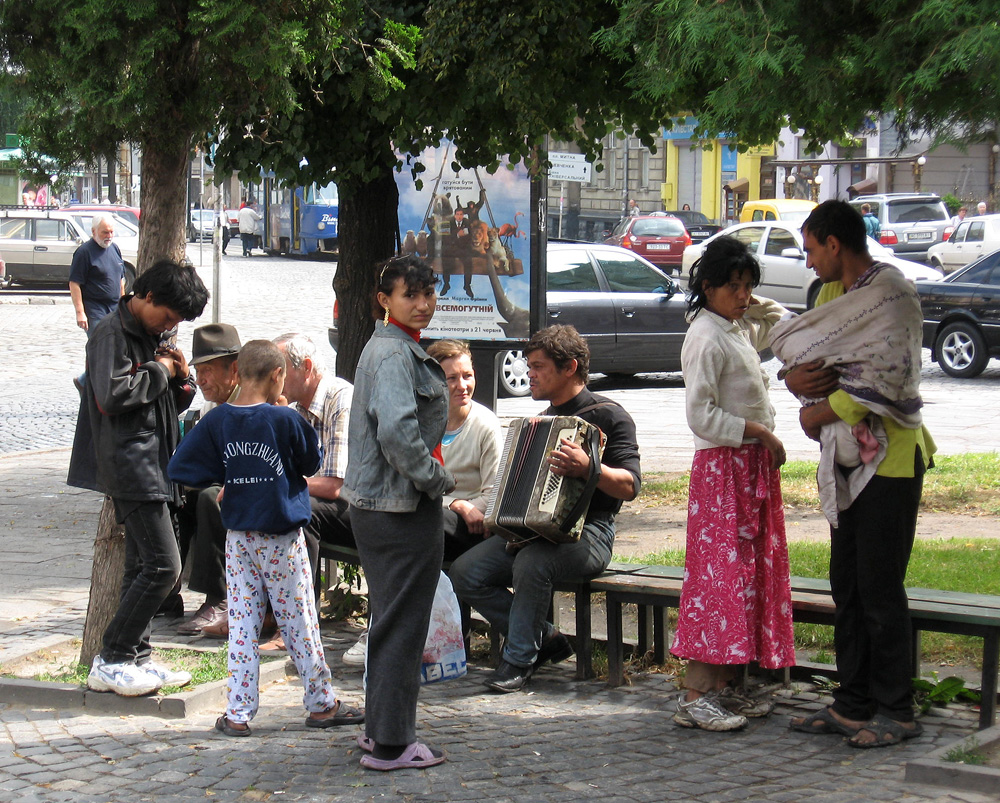
Romani people in Lviv

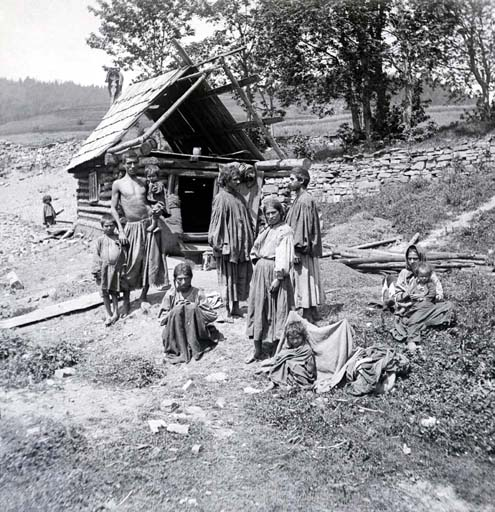
Romani people in Galicia in 1895

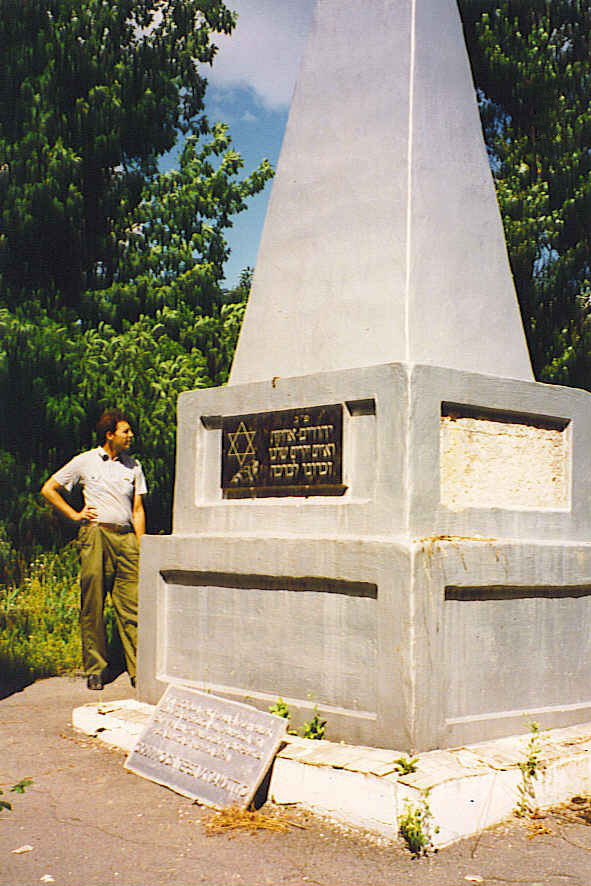
Monument at the Nazi mass killing site in Derazhnia. Approximately 4,000 Jews and Romani were shot here on 20 September 1942

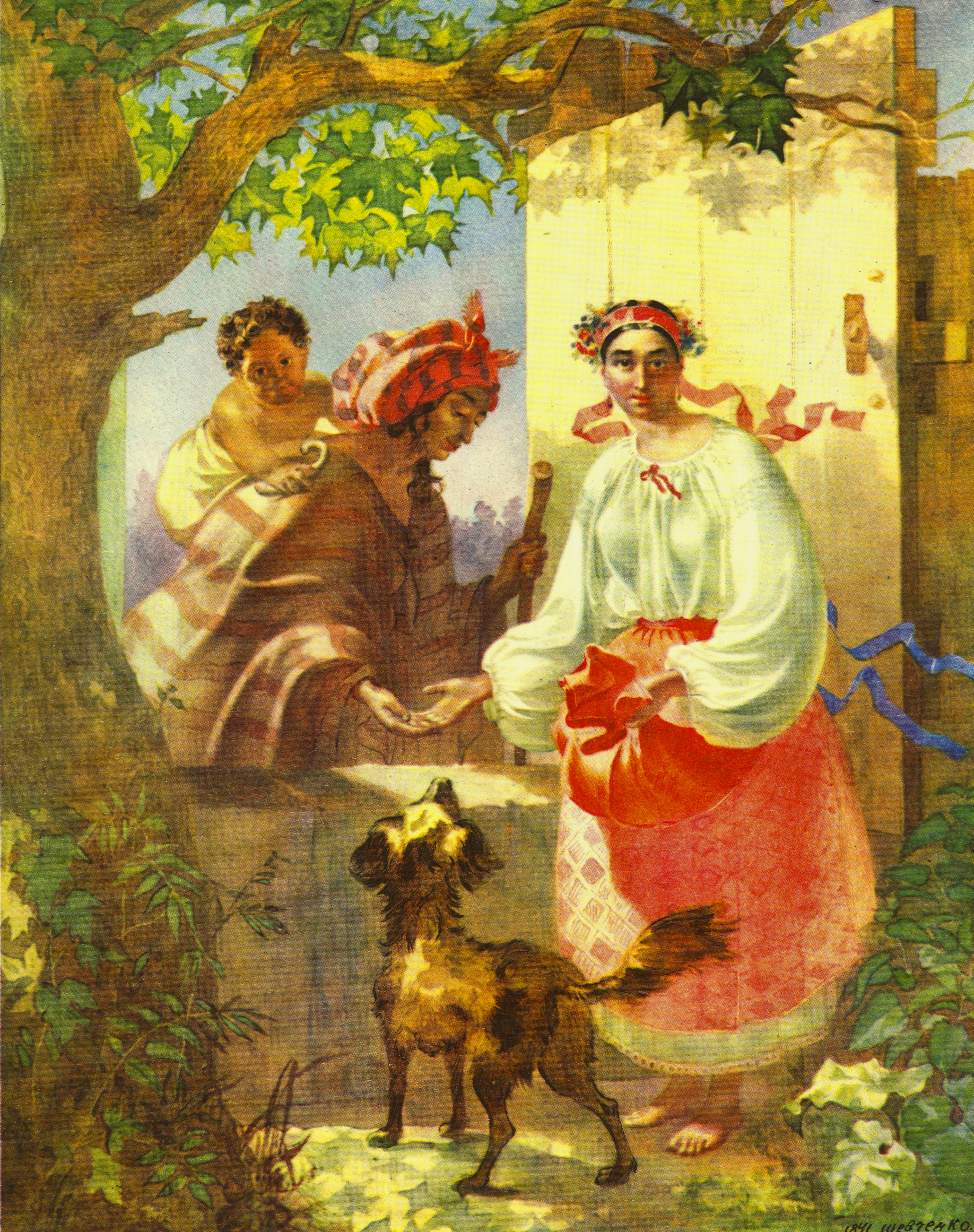
"Gypsy Fortune-Teller" 1841 watercolor composition by Taras Shevchenko

== See also ==
- Servitka Roma
- Romani people
- Racism in Ukraine

== Sources ==
- Yanush Panchenko, Mykola Homanyuk. (2023). Servur'a and Krym'a (Crimean Roma) as indigenous peoples of Ukraine // Etnografia Polska, 67(1–2). p. 155-173.
- Encyclopedia of Ukraine Vol. 2 (G-K) Toronto, 1988
- УКРАЇНСЬКІ ЦИГАНИ
