= Prince Crawfish =

Belarusian folktale about an enchanted husband in crawfish form

Prince Crawfish (Belarusian: "Рак Царэвіч") is a Belarusian folktale collected by Belarusian ethnographer and folklorist Evdokim Romanov. Folklorist Lev Barag later republished it in German as Der Krebs als Zarensohn ("The Crab as Son-in-Law").

The tale is related to the international cycle of the Animal as Bridegroom or The Search for the Lost Husband: a human maiden marries an animal that is a prince in disguise, breaks a taboo and loses him, and she has to seek him out.

== Summary ==
An old couple suffers for they have no son. One day, the old man captures a crawfish in a bucket and the animal tells him he wants to be his son. Some time later, the crab son asks his father to go to court and ask for the hand of the czar's daughter in marriage. The czar laughs at the silly proposition and orders the poor man three tasks for his crawfish son: to build a bridge encrusted with gold and silver between the palace and the old couple's hut; to plant a tree along the road that yields golden and silver fruits, and to have a marching band with fine garments and a fine horse. The crawfish prince tells his father not to worry, and goes to the lake where he was found; he takes off his crawfish shell and summons the fishes and crabs to provide him with the tasks.

After seeing the results of his orders, such was their impossibility, the czar admits his prospective son-in-law must be someone magical and marries one of his daughters to the crab. The princess discovers the crab prince becomes a handsome man at night and tells her sisters as rebuttal to their mockery, and her sisters say they will burn the shell. That night, while the crawfish prince and the princess are asleep, they burn the shell; the crawfish prince awakens, sensing something is afoot, and learns of the burnt shell. He admonishes his wife and tells her to find him after wearing down three pairs of iron boots, three iron canes and eating three iron loaves of bread. He summons his magical horse Sivko-Burko, his father's mount, and vanishes into the sky.

The princess follows through with his directions and walks a long road: she meets on the way her sisters-in-law, who shelter her and each give her an item (a cloth embroidered with gold and silver, a golden and silver haircomb, and a spinning wheel with a spindle). Her third sister-in-law advises her to reach the next town with a bazaar, open up shop and put the items on show, for a noblewoman will come to buy the objects, but she must refuse money and ask to sleep with her husband for three nights. Twice it happens, but the princess fails to awake her husband, because the noblewoman gave him a sleeping potion. He only awakens on her third attempt and recognizes her.

== Analysis ==
=== Tale type ===
The tale is classified in the East Slavic Folktale Classification (Russian: СУС, romanized: SUS) as type SUS 440, Russian: Муж-рак, romanized: Muzh-rak, lit. 'Crawfish-husband': the heroine marries a crawfish or water animal that fulfilled the king's tasks; he takes off the animal skin at night to become a handsome youth; the heroine burns the animal skin and has to seek him out.

Russian scholarship suggests that East Slavic types SUS 433B and SUS 440 are closely related. In type SUS 433B, Russian: Царевич-рак, romanized: Tsarevich-rak, lit. 'Prince Crawfish', a woman gives birth to a crawfish who marries the princess; the princess burns his animal skin and has to seek him out; she trades expensive items to spend a night with her husband and he recognizes her.

However, in the international Aarne-Thompson-Uther Index, the tale corresponds to type ATU 425A, "The Animal (Monster) as Bridegroom": the princess burns the husband's animal skin and she must seek him out, even paying a visit to the Sun, the Moon and the Wind and gaining their help. The heroine is given marvellous objects on the way to her husband by the personifications of the elements, or by her helpers, and she uses them to bribe the false bride for a night with him. Only on the third night the heroine manages to talk to her husband and he recognizes her.

=== Motifs ===
==== The crawfish husband ====
In his work on Cupid and Psyche and other Animal as Bridegroom tales, Swedish scholar Jan-Öjvind Swahn located in Eastern Europe variants wherein the animal bridegroom is in the shape of a lobster, shrimp, crayfish and crab, in regards to his type B, which involves the heroine bribing the false bride for three nights with her husband with the gifts she gained from her helpers. (Note: For clarification: Swahn's type B corresponds to type ATU 425A of the international index: heroine journeys far and wide and gains objects to bribe the false bride.) Similarly, in his work about animal symbolism in Slavic culture, Russian philologist Aleksandr V. Gura stated that the crawfish has male symbolism, and marries the heroine in East Slavic types SUS 433B, "Царевич-рак" ("Prince Crawfish"), and SUS 440, "Муж-рак" ("Crawfish Husband"), although the crawfish bridegroom may be replaced by another type of animal in variants, like frogs, toads, snakes, serpents and worms.

Russian scholars A. P. Razumova and G. I Senkina stated that the crawfish ('rak', in the original) as the form of the enchanted husband is unique to the Pomor tradition, and nowhere else. In the Pomor tales, the crawfish is captured by the old man in a net, fulfills the king's tasks and marries the princess, who betrays his trust either by revealing his secret or burning his shell.

==== Fulfilling the monarch's tasks ====
According to Russian folklorist Lev Barag, type SUS 440 with the motifs of the crawfish suitor fulfilling the king's pre-marriage tasks (akin to type SUS 560, "The Magic Ring"), is "characteristic" of Ukrainian and Belarusian tales. According to Jan-Öjvind Swahn and Georgios A. Megas, the motif of the animal suitor fulfilling the king's tasks before he marries the heroine appears in variants from Eastern Europe and the Near East.

==== The heroine's journey ====
According to Hans-Jörg Uther, the main feature of tale type ATU 425A is "bribing the false bride for three nights with the husband". In fact, when he developed his revision of Aarne-Thompson's system, Uther remarked that an "essential" trait of the tale type ATU 425A was the "wife's quest and gifts" and "nights bought".

== Variants ==
=== East Slavic ===
==== Belarus ====
Ethnographer Michał Federowski collected and published four other tales from Belarus: Ab ràczku ("About the little crayfish"), Ab kralèwiczu zaklátum ṷ ráka ("About the prince enchanted to be a crayfish"), Ab kralèwiczu-ràczku ("About the little crayfish-prince"), and an untitled one.

In a Belarusian tale titled Ab ràczku or "Аб рачку" ("About the little crayfish"), an old man goes to fetch firewood in the forest, when a crayfish begins to talk and asks to be taken home with him. Despite some reservations, the man takes the crayfish with him. Some time later, the crayfish learns of a local tsar who has three daughters, and asks the man to court one of the princesses on his behalf. The man is shocked at the crustacean's words, but goes to talk to tsar about his adoptive son and the princess's prospective son-in-law. The tsar then orders the crayfish to build a diamond bridge between the man's house and the palace. The old man reports to the crayfish about the task, and he accomplishes overnight. For the next task, the tsar orders the crayfish to plant poppies along the road overnight: the crayfish asks for some poppy seeds, which he plants and trees grow overnight. As a last task, the tsar asks the crayfish to sew a dress for the princess, without ever seeing her. The crustacean does it and the man delivers the dress to the princesses, which fits in all of them. Thus, the crayfish is brought on a platter to his wedding and marries the princess. On the wedding night, the crayfish removes his shell and reveals himself to be a handsome youth to the princess. He explains a witch cursed him into that form. The next day, the princess takes the crayfish shell and burns it. The youth despairs at the fact and says he could have endured another month, but now he does not know even if he will be able to escape the curse. He then gives her some climbing shoes, telling her to find him, turns into a pigeon and flies away. The princess cries for her decision, but puts on the shoes and wanders through mountains and forests until she reaches a derelct house where a witch lives. The witch does not welcome her in, but guides her to another witch who can give her a job of feeding her pigeons. The second witch's pigeons are actually enchanted princes. The princess is hired to look after the pigeons and recognizes her husband in avian form. Her husband tells her that, after a year, when she is to be paid her wages, she is to ask for one of the birds, and he will nod his head to her. After a whole year, the witch goes to talk to the princess and asks if she wants to work another year. The princess refuses, and asks for one of the pigeons as her payment. The witch bids her choose one of the birds, and her husband, in bird form, nods. The princess takes her husband back and walks back home. On the way, her shoes are worn out, and the prince returns to human form. Thus, the princess and her husband return home and celebrate.

==== Russia ====
According to Russian scholarship, East Slavic type SUS 433B has seven variants registered in Siberia.

In a Russian tale collected from a Pomor source in Karelia with the title "Про Рака Раковича" ("About Crayfish Son of Crayfish" in Andreas John's translation or "About Rak Rakovich" in Jack V. Haney's), an old man and an old woman live together. One day, he goes to the seashore and catches a crayfish (a lobster, Haney's translation), bringing it home. The crayfish lives like a crustacean by day and becomes human by night, to their admiration. Later, the crayfish son asks his father to ask for the hand of the king's daughter in marriage. Despite some reservations, he goes to the king, who accepts the proposal, as long as the crayfish builds a palace like the king. The old man reports back to the crayfish, who takes off its shell and summons his horse Sivushki-burushki, who has "served his father". The horse appears and magically conjures the palace for its master. Next, the king orders the crayfish to dig deep ditches around his palace, large enough for ships to dock and with sailors on the ships, which is also fulfilled with the help of the magic horse. Lastly, he orders the crayfish to build a church will bells for the princess to marry inside. After fulfilling the tasks, the crayfish marries the princess, and is brought to her on a plate. However, to the princess's delight, he becomes a man at night. One day, she visits her parents, who nudge her into talking about her marital life. Twice, she keeps the secret, but, on the third tie, reveals her husband is in fact a young man. She returns to her palace that same night and cannot find her husband anywhere. She tells her mother her husband is missing, and some old ladies advise her to go through a certain path. Following the path, the princess passes by the spinning huts of three yaga-babas, where she is given three embroidered scarves, and balls of yarn. She finally reaches the place where her husband is, and begins to embroider a scarf while sailing on a boat. The crayfish's sister, her sister-in-law, sees the princess embroidering and wishes to have the scarf for herself. On three successive occasions, the princess trades one scarf with the crayfish's sister for one night with him. She cannot wake him up on the first two nights, but manages on the third one. He wakes up and he recognizes her.

Russian folklorist Aleksandr Nikiforov summarized a tale he collected from a teller named Maxim Vasilievich Semyonov. In his tale, an old couple adopts a crayfish as their son, who has magic powers. One day, the old couple bring him to the king as a gift, and the crayfish demands the king's daughter as his wife. The king orders the crustacean to fulfill some tasks first, among which to erect a crystal bridge. He does and marries the princess. On the wedding night, he takes off the crayfish shell and becomes a human youth. The princess, advised by her mother, burns the crayfish shell and he disappears, prompting a quest for him.

Razumova and Senkina reported another tale from a Karelian Pomor source, collected from a teller named Anna Semyonovna Nikitina. In her tale, an old man catches a crayfish in the sea and brings it home as his son. The crayfish wants to marry the princess and fulfills the king's suitor tasks. Later, the princess burns his shell and he vanishes; she goes after him and finds him with the help of some witches.

==== Romani-Russian ====
In a Romani-Russian tale titled "О раке, взявшем в жены царскую дочь" ("About the crawfish that married the tsar's daughter"), collected from informant Aleksandr Vasilyev, from Smolensk, in 1930, and archived by N. L. Pankov, a gypsy man called Grisha lives alone with his wife, without horses and no money, while his wife begs for alms. One day, Grisha goes fishing and catches a crawfish, who asks him to be allowed to be taken with the gypsy man to his house as his son. Grisha believes the animal and takes his home, introducing it as their son to his wife. The woman mocks Grisha for bringing an animal as their son, thinking him mad, but the crawfish tells her to look in the pantry: she finds much gold for them. The crawfish lives with the couple for a year, and asks the woman to court the local tsar's daughter as his bride. Despite some reluctance, the woman goes to the tsar's court and relays his son's interest in marrying the princess. The tsar orders her to raze an entire forest, sow rye, harvest it, grind it to flour and bake the flour into bread - all in a single night. The woman returns home to inform the crawfish about it, and they go to sleep, except for the crustacean son, who summons twelve of his youth servants to fulfill the tsar's task. By morning, the monarch has bread on his table. The woman returns to the talk to the tsar, who requests that the bridegroom-to-be needs to build an apple orchard by the palace, where birds sing, rivers flow and seals live in water and speak live scholars - all that by morning. The crawfish summons his servants at night and orders them to fulfill the second request. Finally, the tsar asks for a palace, a bridge and a church to be built. The crawfish son fulfills the third request. Grisha's wife comes to the palace to talk about the prospective marriage, and the tsar relents and they discuss matter of the marriage and uniting their families. The crayfish marries on Sunday in a grand celebration, but the princess is crying all the time. Still, she bears him a son, then a daughter after three years. Feeling his wife lives with him without love, the crayfish asks his wife to make a promise, then casts off his shell to reveal a handsome youth - his true form, since he is actually a human person transformed into a crustacean by the work of devils, but he will soon cast the shell. The princess becomes very happy with this revelation, and looks like an entirely different person to her father. They pester her long enough, and she reveals her husband lives inside the crustacean shell due to an evil spell, which will soon be over by the next full moon. Her sisters advise her to burn the shell instead. The princess waits for her husband's return at night and burns the shell. He smells the burning, wakes up and admonishes his wife, saying she has lost her children; turns their son into a nightingale, their daughter into a cuckoo, shackles the princess's hands and places iron boots on her feet. He tells the princess she will only find him again by wearing out the iron, then vanishes into the sky. The princess berates her sisters, then ponders what ti do next, so she decides to search for her husband. She passes by lands and lands, wandering off until she finds small house in the forest where an old woman welcomes her. The old woman says the princess's husband passed by, playing on a guitar. The princess pleads for directions, so the old woman gives her a small apple and two skirts, one sky-blue one for the second day, and the other a white one embroidered with stars. The princess throws the apple on the ground, which shoots up to the sky, falls to the ground and rolls on the earth for her to follow. After a while, the princess reaches a palace atop a hill. She hires herself as a chicken-herder, and plays with the magic apple. This draws the attention of the local queen, who wants the apple. The princess offers to trade the apple for a night with the queen's husband in his chambers. The princess tries to wake him up, to no avail. She then dons the skirts to trade for the remaining two nights: on the second night, she also fails, since the prince is fast asleep. The story then explains the queen has drugged the prince with a sleeping potion made with bitter roots for the first two nights, but she drinks the potion on the third night, which allows the princess to talk to the prince. The prince wakes up and recognizes his wife, who tells him she bought him from the queen by trading him for fine clothes. The couple return home and he summons the gypsies for a question: which wife is more precious, one that sells her husband for clothes or one that searches the whole world for him? The gypsies agree that he should take the wife that suffered for him. Thus, the human crayfish prince waves a hand, and a nightingale and a cuckoo fly in, then resume their human forms as the princess's children.

==== Ukraine ====
In a Ukrainian tale from Podolia published by Ukrainian literary critic Mykola Levchenko as a variation ("ТЕЖ") of a tale titled "Зачарований королевич-рачок стає за приймака дідові і сватає королівну" ("The enchanted Prince-Crawfish cares for his grandfather and woos the Queen"), a fisherman catches a crawfish and brings it home for he and his wife to eat. However, while the man's wife is preparing the cauldron to cook the crawfish, the animal hides away in a corner. The next day, the crawfish begins to talk and asks the old man to go to the king's court and woo the princess on his behalf. The old fisherman goes to the king's presence and tells of the crawfish's proposition. The king says he will marry the princess as long as the crawfish builds a golden bridge between the fisherman's house and the castle. The fisherman returns home and tells the crawfish the king's terms. The animal tells the fisherman not to worry and, the next day, a golden bridge appears between both houses. The king then consents to their marriage, and weds his daughter to the crawfish, which is brought on a plate to the princess on the wedding night. Suddenly, while the princess is asleep, the crawfish takes off his shell and becomes a handsome youth, and sleeps by the princess's side. The next morning, the human crawfish tells the princess he is the crawfish and she must not tell anyone the secret. However, the princess blurbs the secret to her mother, the queen, who advises her to cook the shell in a pot. The next night, while the human crawfish is asleep, the princess takes the shell and cooks it in a pot. The human crawfish wakes up and warns his wife she should not have done that, and curses her to wear an iron outfit, before he disappears. The next day, the princess puts on an iron outfit and begins a quest for her husband. She passes by an old woman in the forest and works for her for a year, and is given a golden branch and a golden lingot. She wanders a bit more and finds another old woman, whom she works for and is paid with a golden hen with chicks. She lastly finds a third woman, works for her and is given a golden yarn. At last, the princess reaches a castle where she finds work as a goose-herder. The princess asks around for her crawfish husband and discovers he has married the mistress of the castle. The princess then uses the three golden objects to bribe the mistress of the castle for a night with the human crawfish. She fails on the first two nights, since the mistress of the castle gives a sleeping draught to the human crawfish, but she succeeds on the third night. The human crawfish wakes up and the princess's iron garments fall off her body. The crawfish then stays with the princess.

In a Ukrainian tale titled "Рак-неборак і його вірна жінка" ("The Poor Crawfish and his Faithful Wife"), an old couple have three daughters. One day, the old woman sends his elder daughter to fetch water from a well. The eldest daughter takes a bucket and fills it with water, but a crawfish grabs the bucket and stops the girl, and is only willing to let her go if she marries him. The girl refuses and the crawfish pushes her into the well. The same fate befalls the middle sister. The youngest daughters goes to the well and the crawfish stops her to propose. The youngest daughter accepts his proposal and the crustacean shows her the sisters, still alive. The girl returns home and tells her parents to prepare for a wedding with the crawfish. On the wedding day, the crawfish does not appear; instead, a handsome youth on a white horse and his retinue appear. The youth marries the girl and whispers at her ear he is the crawfish, but she has to wait for a year and three months for his curse to fade. They marry, and the youth assumes the crustacean shape. Near the end of the time of the curse, the human youth tells his wife to wake him up at night when she hears three whistles by the window. However, the girl is sound asleep and cannot wake him up. The next morning, the youth places the crawfish shell on himself, tells his wife to look for him, and dives into the water. The girl goes back to her mother and asks her to make provisions for the road. She departs and meets an old man on the road, who directs her to the Blue Mountains, where the Moon lives with his mother. The girl walks to the house of the Moon and asks the Moon and his mother where she can find her husband. The Moon does not know, and directs her to the house of the Wind, who might know something. The Wind knows where the crawfish is, and agrees to take the girl to the golden castle where he is being kept in crustacean shape inside a fence. The girl sees him and goes to embrace him, which turns him human forever. The mistress of the castle, an "old snake", sees the heartwarming reunion and, in a fit of rage, breaks in many pieces.

In a Ukrainian tale collected by Ukrainian poet Ivan Manzhura with the title "Дід та рак" and translated as "Дед и рак" ("Old Man and Crawfish"), an old man lives near the sea with his wife, and complains he has no children, and there are no fishes in the sea to catch. One day, he manages to catch a crawfish in the sea, but the animal tells him to dip his arm in the water and grab a certain thing in the water. The old man grabs a bag of money, which he spends. Later, he goes to catch the crawfish again, but the animal asks him to go into the water. He does and gets another bag of money. Some time later, the crayfish asks the old man to ask for the hand of the princess in marriage. The old man goes to the king and makes a proposition on the crayfish's behalf. The king orders the crayfish to build a palace and a bridge between their palaces, with gold and silver, and to have trees with ripened fruits alongside the path. The old man reports back to the crawfish, and, the next morning, there is a palace and a bridge connecting to the king's castle. The princess is wed to the crawfish, who lives by the stove in the morning and takes off the shell at night to become a human youth. One day, the princess takes the crayfish shell and burns it. The human crayfish then appears to her and complains that she should have waited until the end of the curse, but now she has to wear iron laces on her body which may one day come off if he returns. He vanishes, and the princess keeps waiting, until he finally comes back.

Ethnographer Antoni Jaksa-Marcinkowski published a Ukrainian tale titled Raka ("Crayfish"). In this tale, an old man complains he has no son, and prays to God to have a son. His wife then gives birth to a crayfish, which he loves like a human son. Years later, the crayfish begins to talk and asks his father to go to the king and make a bid for the princess's hand. The old man cries over the idea, but his goes to talk to the king. The king asks the man to bring his crayfish son to court, which he does. The king sees the little animal and orders him to build overnight a palace grander that the king's, in both silver and gold. The old man goes back home in tears, but the crayfish tells his father not to worry. During the night, the crayfish summons reptiles, snakes and frogs and commands them to build him a palace following the king's specifications. The next day, the crayfish goes to the king's palace and marries the princess. During the night, the princess waits for her crayfish husband, but sees a handsome youth entering the nuptial chambers. She lives with him, who alternates between human shape at night and a crayfish shape during the day. The princess's mother and sisters despise the crayfish husband, and she tells them he does become a human at times. Her family then tells her to get rid of the crayfish shell. The princess decides to burn the shell the next time her husband takes it off: while he lies asleep in bed, the princess takes the crayfish shell and throws it in the fire. The human crayfish's body begins to contort in pain, and he dies in the princess's arms.

=== Poland ===
In a Polish tale collected by Antoni Józef Gliński with the title O królewiczu zakletym w raka ("About the Prince Changed into a Crawfish"), an unlucky fisherman tries his luck by fishing in the sea two days in a row, and captures a crawfish. The brings it home and asks his wife to prepare it for cooking, but the crawfish pleads for the couple to spare him, for he will bring them fortune. He comes out of the crawfish shell and, with a magic incantation, fills their table with food. Later, the local king promises to marry his daughter, the princess, to anyone that can defeat the enemies who are sieging the city. The crawfish comes out of the shell, turns into a prince and summons his loyal mount, siwko, to defeat the king's snemies. Later, the king delays the wedding, by requesting a palace to be built and a new church. The crawfish prince fulfills the tasks and angrily tells the king that, if he does not agree to their marriage, the crawfish will take the princess with him and drown the city. The king relents and allows their marriage in the splendid church the prince built. After the wedding, the king asks his daughter how is life with the crawfish, and she answers her husband takes off his shell at night to become a man, and puts it back on in the morning. The king suggests she burns the shell, which she does. The next morning, the prince cannot find the shell and despairs. He then explains that in three days' time he would have been released from his curse, since he was cursed since birth to be a crawfish, but now she will have to search for him after crying a barrel of tears and wearing out pairs of iron shoes. The prince vanishes and goes to have adventures of his own: he passes by three castles whose kings and queens ask him about their problems and he promises to help them. The human crawfish prince finds a hut spinning on legs that belongs to a witch and a zmij-falcon that knows the answers the prince seeks. Armed with this knowledge, he goes back to the castles, provides people with their answers, then returns to his wife, the princess.

=== Terek Cossacks ===
In a tale from the Terek Cossacks with the title "Рак-царевич" ("Crawfish Prince"), an old couple lives by the sea and lament the fact that they have no children. The man goes to the sea to catch some fish, and a giant crawfish crawls out of the sea and asks the old man to take him in as their son. The man takes the crustacean home to his wife and they live like parents and son. One day, a letter is sent to the old man that the king shall marry his daughter, the princess, to anyone who can build overnight a palace on the other side of the river, with a silver bridge with golden nails and crystal trees alongside the path. The crustacean asks the old man to go and tell the king he can do it. The king threatens the old man that he shall lose his head if he does not fulfill the request. While the old couple sleeps, the crustacean takes off its shell, becomes a youth and commands his servants to build the palace. The next day, the king sees the palace built according to his wishes, and sends another letters: this time, he shall marry the princess to anyone who can erect a stone church with silver and golden domes. The crustacean also fulfills the second task. The king marries the princess to the crawfish, and she resigns to her fate. One day, at night, she notices a man eating some food and goes to sleep again. She then begins to realize her husband becomes human only at night, but returns to the crustacean shell in the morning, and an idea begins to formulate at her mind to keep him human forever. Some time later, the king invites his daughter and her husband for a feast: she leaves home early and mingles with the guests, when she notices her husband - in human form - among the guests. She then pretends to be ill and goes home early, so she can burn the shell in an oven. The human crawfish comes soon after, and explains his story: his stepmother, the queen, placed a crustacean skin on him so he became an animal, and, if the princess would have just waited a little longer, he would regain human form. Disappointed in his wife, he tells her she will only find him if she wears out three iron dresses, and vanishes. After his disappearance, the princess commissions three irons dresses and begins her quest; she passes by three Baba Yagas in their huts in the forest, and each of them gives her a gift: the first a self-moving needle; the second a валёчек ('rolling pin') that washes and irons the clothes by itself, and the third a self-moving loom. After passing by the Baba Yagas, the three dresses break apart, and the princess reaches a castle where she finds work as a seamstress. One day, the other seamstresses comment they have to weave a new dress for the mistress of the castle that is to marry her fiancé (the human crawfish). The princess sews the dress with the magic needle. Next, they are ordered to wash and iron the prince's clothes. The princess uses the rolling pin to fulfill this task. Lastly, they are ordered to weave a silk carpet, which the princess does by using the self-moving loom. One day, the human crawfish pays a visit to the new seamstress in her hut and recognizes his wife. He explains to her his cruel stepmother married him to another woman. However, now that he found his true wife, he expels his stepmother and dismisses his second fiancée, and lives with the princess, his first wife.

=== Baltic Region ===
==== Estonia ====
Tale type ATU 433B is also reported in Estonia with the title Vähk väimeheks ("The Crawfish as Son-in-Law"). In the Estonian variants, the crawfish is adopted by a man, performs the king's tasks and marries the princess. After the marriage, the princess burns the crawfish's shell; he disappears, and the heroine must search for him. According to Estonian scholars, this narrative registers only five or six variants in Estonia.

==== Latvia ====
According to the Latvian Folktale Catalogue, a similar story is found in Latvia, indexed as its own Latvian type *441, Vēzis-dēls ("The Crayfish as a Son"): a poor couple adopts a crayfish as their son; later, the crayfish wants to marry the princess, and asks his adoptive father to woo her on his behalf; the king, the princess's father, orders the crayfish to fulfill some suitor's tasks, which he does; the crayfish marries the princess, who betrays the crayfish's secret by burning his shell and she has to seek him out; during her journey, she obtains miraculous things (tale type ATU 425A).

==== Lithuania ====
Lithuanian scholarship locates 23 variants with a crab husband (Lithuanian: vėžys) in Lithuania, although they are classified as another tale type: AT 441, Pasaka apie ežiuką vyrą ("Tale of the Hedgehog Husband").

=== Komi people ===
In a Komi tale collected by literary critic Kallistrat F. Zhakov with the title "Рак-Молодец" ("Crab - Fine Fellow"), an old fisherman and his wife suffer for they have no child, neither a son nor a daughter, so the wife asks the fisherman to bring them a child, either a son or a daughter. The fisherman goes to the river margin to fetch some firewood, when a crab appears to him. The crustacean asks him about his problem; the fisherman tells him about his lack of a child, and the crab asks the man to adopt him. The fisherman brings the crab home, and, despite his wife's doubts, they both raise it as their son. The crab also shows them his human form, when he leaves his shell, to the couple's relief. Later, the crab asks the fisherman to go to the king and woo the princess on his behalf. The fisherman goes and tells the king his son wants to marry the princess; the king agrees, but sets the crab son three tasks (at separate times): to build overnight an iron bridge with copper railings; to erect a temple without foundations on the ground nor tied to the heavens, and lastly for him to dig out a lake in a meadow, fill it with fishes and plant a garden near the lake. The crab son comes out of the shell, summons his "aunts, mothers" and his servants to fulfill the king's requests. As a last minute request, the king asks the crab to come to the wedding on a horseless carriage. Again, the crab son fulfills it and comes to his own wedding, and is introduced to his bride on a silver plate. They marry and enter the bridal chamber. The princess questions her husband that he is not a mere crustacean, and comes out of his shell as a handsome youth. The next morning, the youth wears the shell again. Meanwhile, the princess tells her mother, the queen, about her husband's situation, and the queen suggests she ought to burn the shell in an oven. The next night, the youth takes off its shell and suspects the princess intents to burn it, but lets it be. However, after he falls sleep, the princess burns his shell. The youth wakes up, gives her a silk ball, which she can use to look for him, and disappears. The princess laments with her mother about her mistake, but decides to seek him out. She casts the silk ball and follows it to the sea; she enters it and reaches a hut. An old man lives inside, who tells her the crab was to soon lose his shell and become human, but he has moved to another kingdom and found himself another bride. Before the princess (called Marfida by the old man) leaves, she is given a comb that can gild her hair and which she can use to bribe the second bride. The princess then continues her journey until she reaches a second old man, who gifts her with a magical blindfold that allows her to see the wonders of the world, and her husband's godmother, who gives her a magical tablecloth that provides food and a pair of copper shoes to cross through a river of fire. After passing the river of fire, Marfida arrives at a castle where she uses the items she gained to bribe the false bride for a night with her husband. She tries to wake him up on the first two nights, but fails, and only manages it on the third. The pair go back to Marfida's parents and live together.

=== Nenets people ===
In a tale sourced from the Nenets people with the title "Муж-налим и его жена марья-царевна" ("Husband-Burbot and his wife Princess Marya"), an old couple have no children. One day, the husband goes to the royal city and finds a burbot near a shore. He tries to kill it, but the fish pleads for his life and asks the man to be taken as his son. The man takes the little fish to his wife and they raise him for three years until he grows big enough. One day, the burbot asks his adoptive father to go to the king and ask for the princess's hand in marriage, but the man has doubts about the burbot's chances, since the monarch rebuffs princely and merchant suitors. Despite his reservations, the burbot insists he goes to the king. The monarch is told of the fish's proposition, and orders he build a large house overnight, otherwise he will lose his head. The old man tells the burbot of the king's request, and the fish asks him not to worry. After the old man sleeps, the fish crawls to the front porch, changes shape into a youth and summons a regiment of thirty soldiers to build the house. Next, the king orders the burbot to build a new church, and erect stone bridges connecting the new church to the old church, the house and the king's palace. The fish also fulfills the orders. Lastly, the king orders the suitor to find him three sleigh horse, which is also fulfilled by the burbot. Admitting defeat, the king gives his daughter in marriage to the fish, despite the people's general mockery. For three years, the princess, named Marya lives with the burbot, who is a fish at daytime and a man by night. One day, she is annoyed of their mockery and decides to burn the fishskin in the stove. A little bird perches on the windowsill and admonishes her for having burned the fishskin, says he would have become human in three days' time, and flies away. A week later, Princess Marya goes to the edge of the city, where she finds an old woman who advises her to commission three pairs of iron boots, three hats and three iron loaves of bread. Marya gets the iron objects from a smith and returns to the old woman, who tells her how to find her husband: the princess will find an entrance in the ground she must climb down with the iron garments; on the way down, he will be accosted with screams and voices telling her to go back, but she must soldier on. Marya heeds the woman's words and walks until she finds the entrance in the ground; she climbs down and walks deep into the earth, the sounds and screams of many voices trying to hinder her, but she pushes forward, her legs bleeding for her efforts, until she sees a light at the end and crosses it. She stops to rest for a week and finds a house where Baba Yaga lives. The witch welcomes Marya, and explains her burbot-husband has been in this realm for the last ten years and married the daughter of the "fiery king". The princess lives with Baba Yaga, and, after a week, the witch says there is a small hil near a garden where the fiery king's daughter will take a stroll with her handmaidens, and gives Marya a comb so she call trade it with the fiery king's daughter for a night with her husband, the now human burbot. Princess Marya follows her instructions and is guided to her husband's quarters, where he lies sleeping due to a sleeping draught his second bride gave him. Failing the first night, Marya returns to Baba Yaga's hut and, after a week, is given a ring as the next item to trade for a night with her husband. It happens again, and again she fails, for her husband is still fast asleep. The princess goes back to Baba Yaga and is given a beautiful handkerchief, and a warning that this will be the last opportunity to save her husband. Marya trades the handkerchief with the fiery king's daughter and enters his chambers to wake him up, but still he does not respond. The fiery king's daughter comes in and takes her away, but Marya's tears fall on her husband's face and he wakes up. The burbot husband recognizes Marya, and assembles the crowd to ask for their verdict: if he should stay with a woman who braved dangers and risked her own life to find him, or the one who sold him for trinkets. The crowd answers he should stay with the former, and he takes Marya on an old chest back to the surface, to her father's kingdom. The tale was republished by folklorist Erna Pomérantseva and translated as The Burbot and Princess Marya, His Wife. The tale was also republished as Princess Marya and the Burbot.

== See also ==
- The Fisher-Girl and the Crab
- The Golden Crab
- The Little Crab (Greek folktale)
- King Lindworm
