= Sasha Kolpakov =

Russian musician (born 1943)

Aleksandr Kolpakov Александр Колпаков
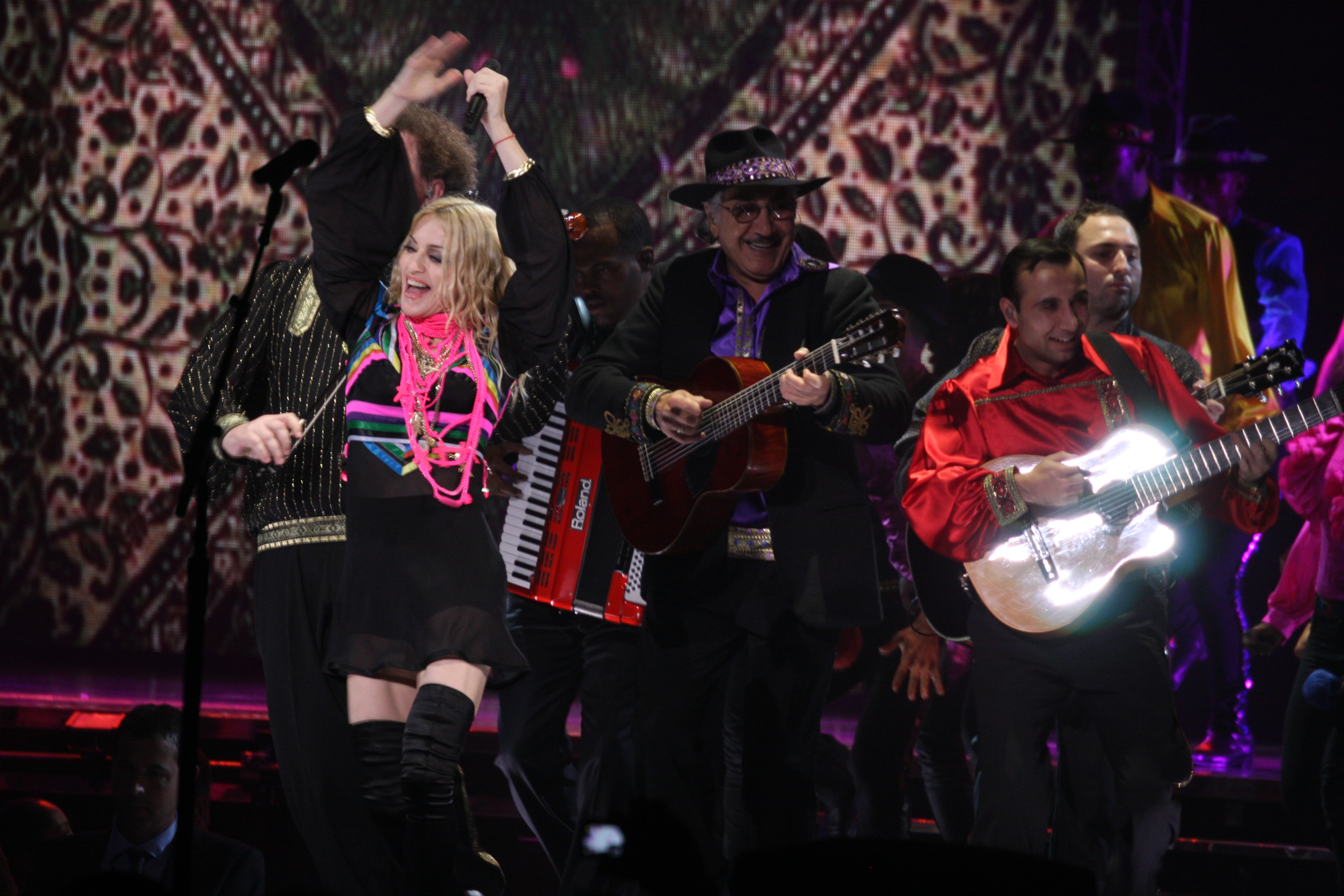
- Alexander and Vadim Kolpakov with Madonna, during Sticky & Sweet Tour in 2008
- Born: Aleksandr Alexandrovich Kolpakov; 15 February 1943 (age 83); Buzuluk, Orenburg Oblast, RSFSR, Soviet Union
- Died: November 13, 2025 (aged 82); Moscow, Russia
- Occupations: Guitarist; singer; composer
- Title: Merited Artist of the Russian Federation

Aleksandr Alexandrovich Kolpakov (Russian: Александр Александрович Колпаков; (February 15, 1943 - November 13, 2025) was a Soviet and Russian guitarist, singer and composer.

== Biography ==
Coming from a Servo family, a group of Romani people found mostly in Russia and Ukraine, he started playing a seven string guitar at an early age while living in the region of Saratov. Having moved twenty years ago to Moscow, he played in several groups but worked mostly in the Romen Theatre, the only Romani theater in existence in the world.

Kolpakov also engaged in independent projects, such as playing with the Kolpakov Trio, the first Russian Romani ensemble to tour North America in the post-communist period. His nephew, Vadim Kolpakov has mastered the seven-string guitar and has been a member of the Kolpakov Trio since 1994.

As a soloist and composer, Rodava Tut is Sasha's first record, published by Opre, a Swiss label dedicated to the promotion of Romani music. His music is typical of what one could listen to while spending an evening at home with Roma. Some of the songs are several hundred years old.

He performed at American singer Madonna’s Sticky & Sweet Tour.
