= The Little Crab =

Modern Greek folktale from Siteia

The Little Crab (Modern Greek: Τό καβράκι, romanized: To kavráki, German: Der kleine Krebs) is a Modern Greek folktale translated and published by Greek folklorist Georgios A. Megas from a source in Siteia, in 1938.

The tale is related to the international cycle of the Animal as Bridegroom or The Search for the Lost Husband, in that a heroine marries a supernatural husband in animal shape, loses him, and has to seek him out. It is also classified in the international Aarne-Thompson-Uther Index as tale type 425B, "Son of the Witch", thus distantly related to the Graeco-Roman myth of Cupid and Psyche.

== Sources ==
According to Megas, the tale was collected by M. Loudaki from a female teller named Urania Karantoni, from Seteios, Sitia, Crete.

== Summary ==
A widow lives with her three daughters, and they earn their living by gathering herbs in the mountains. One day, the youngest takes her basket next to a river and finds a little crab she takes with her to her house. The little crab comes out of the basket and lives with the woman until it grows larger and larger. One night, the widow has a dream about the crab ordering her to go to the king by sunset of the following day and ask for the king's daughter's hand in marriage for the crab. The woman wakes up and does not pay much attention to the contents of her dream. The following day, the crab appears to her and threatens to devour her if she does not go to the king's palace on the crab's orders.

After the threat, the widow goes to the palace and tells the king there is a crab in her house that wishes to marry the princess. The king then orders him to perform a task first: he has to build a palace unlike any other on Earth next to the king's. The crab summons all devils with a whistle and commands them to erect the palace. The next day, the king orders a second task: to build a garden with all types of trees and all birds that sing in the morning. The crab also fulfills the task. Lastly, the king orders the crab to have the sky above the city of golden colour. The next morning, the sky is indeed painted with golden colour. The king then concedes that the crab must be no ordinary person, and arranges his daughter's marriage to the crab. The husband-to-be arrives in a coach in the palace, and the princess, on seeing the crustacean, relents and marries him. She cries herself to sleep but wakes up when she sees a handsome youth next to her. She tries to push him away, but the youth explains he is the crab, changed to that shape by his mother so no maiden could marry him, and that she has to keep it secret, otherwise she must seek him out with three of iron shoes and with three iron canes. The princess promises him to keep his secret.

However, eight days after the wedding, still during the festivities, the populace mocks her for marrying a crab, but, on hearing this, she tells them the crab shell is only his disguise and points to a youth as her husband. The crab flies in the air and vanishes. The princess, then, goes after him wearing three pairs of iron shoes and walking with iron canes. She wears the iron apparel down, until she reaches a river. She stops to rest and wet some cookies on the river, but the stream is strong and carries her off to Drakäna's house, her mother-in-law.

The Drakäna takes her in and orders the princess to plant beans in the morning, harvest them in the afternoon, and cook her a meal after the Drakäna returns. The princess goes to cry near the river, where she hears a masculine voice asking for a kiss, but she declines the voice's offer. The son of the Drakäna, her husband, appears to her and advises her how to fulfill the task, and she must deny that she had help from her son, with the caveat that, if his mother mentions "your bitter death", the princess must reply with "my sweet death" (in reference to him).

The following day, the Drakäna says she wants the house swept and unswept, the meal cooked and uncooked, and the waterjugs filled and unfilled. The same mysterious voice asks the princess for a kiss, which she declines, but advises her how to fulfill the second task: she is to place a trash heap in the middle of the room and sprinkle a bit over the house; then, she is to place the pan in the oven and let it be; and fill the waterjugs to the half. The princess follows the instructions and fulfills the task, but the Drakäna insists she had help.

The following day, the Drakäna says her son is to be married, and gives the princess two heaps of dirty clothes to be washed with a single bar of soap, and a piece of bread to feed her dog and her donkey with. The voice appears again and asks for a kiss, which the princess refuses, but tells her to go up the mountain and shout for the Neraidas of the mountain to come and wash the clothes, since the Drakäna's son is getting married. The princess takes the dog and the donkey with her up the mountain and summons the Neraidas; they come and wash the clothes, and give food for both animals.

The Drakäna comes back and sees that the tasks have been fulfilled, and orders the princess to fill twelve sacks with feathers, for she wants twelve pillows for her son's wedding guests. The mysterious male voice advises the princess to go to the woods and shout at the birds that the Drakäna's son is dead, and they will give her their feathers; once she has enough feathers, she is to dismiss them by saying she lied about his death.

The last task done, the Drakäna plans another way to devour the human girl: she orders the princess to go beyond another mountain where her sister, the witch, lives, and get from there violins and drums for the upcoming wedding. The Drakäna's son tells the princess this is a trap, and advises her to proceed: on the streets, she is to pluck a fig full of worms from a fig tree, eat it and compliment the tree; drink from a muddy and dirty spring and compliment it; cut off a rag of her dress and give to a woman cleaning an oven with her breasts; enter the witch's house and, while she is distracted sharpening her teeth, the princess is to get the instruments and escape. The princess follows the instructions to the letter and gets the instruments while the witch is in the kitchen, but she quickly exits the kitchen and commands the woman at the oven, the spring and the fig tree to stop her, to no avail.

Finally, the Drakäna celebrates her son's wedding to another bride, and glues candles on the princess's fingers, so she illuminates the sleeping couple for the whole night, and burns to death while at it. The false bride enters the chamber and sees the princess. The Drakäna's son takes the candles from the princess's hands and places them on the false bride, who burns to death, while the pair escapes back to the princess's father's castle.

== Analysis ==
=== Tale type ===
Georgios A. Megas classified the tale as tale type AaTh 425A. Similarly, Greek folktale scholars Anna Angelopoulou and Aigle Brouskou, editors of the Greek Folktale Catalogue, classified the tale as type AaTh 425A. In addition, the two folklorists follow Megas and treat subtype A as "Cupid and Psyche".

The Greek folklorists follow Jan-Öjvind Swahn, who, in his monograph, indexed type 425A as the "oldest" of the "Animal as Bridegroom" subtypes. In the international index, however, Megas's and Swahn's typing is indexed as type ATU 425B, "The Son of the Witch".

=== Motifs ===
Greek folklorist Georgios A. Megas noted it was "traditional" in Greek variants of type 425A (see above) and 425D for the animal husband to be adopted and fulfill the king's tasks before marrying the princess.

== Variants ==
=== Greece ===
According to Greek folktale scholars Anna Angelopoulou and Aigle Brouskou, editors of the Greek Folktale Catalogue, Greek variants of Greek type 425A (which corresponds to the international type ATU 425B) number 89 texts and were collected "mainly" from the Greek islands and Southern Greece.

==== The Crab (Kos) ====
In a tale collected by Jacob Zarrafits with the title Ο κάβουρας from Kos, and published by Richard MacGillivray Dawkins with the title The Crab, or The Fairy Husband and His Jealous Mother, three poor, but beautiful girls live with their old mother. One day, when they go the river to wash their clothes, the youngest finds a little crab and pockets the animal in her dress. When the sisters return home, they question what they can eat, and the third sister shows them the crab she brought from the river. When the girl goes to cook the crab in the pot, the crab turns into a handsome youth and explains he fell in love with her, promising to depart and return with fitting arrangements to have her as his bride. The next day, a tower springs near their house as their new home, and the Crab bridegroom provides a chest with fine clothes for his in-laws. The old mother and her daughters enter the tower and meet with Crab, who presents them with finer garments and marries the old woman's third daughter in a grand ceremony. Some time later, after his elder sisters-in-law to the vizier's son and the prince, the Crab husband suggests he takes his human wife to meet his mother. His wife agrees, and they go back to the river where she found him: they turn into a pair of crabs, then swim the river until they reach the other side, where they regain human form. The pair meets Crab's brothers, metamorphosed into snakes, who accompany them to their mother's tower. Before she meets with her mother-in-law, Crab explains his mother is an ogress (δράκισσα, in the original), and turns his wife into a little crab. Crab greets his mother and asks her if she would devour a girl he brought as his wife to meet her. The ogress says she would rather eat Crab's father's bones. Crab introduces his human wife to his ogress mother. However, some time later, the ogress begins to force tasks on the human daughter-in-law to test her "courage": first, she is to take piles of clothes to wash in the river, but the soap must be left intact; she is also to iron and fold them by evening, then to feed a donkey with chaff and a dog with a bone, but their fodder must not be touched. The girl takes the donkey and the dog, but her husband Crab meets her en route, teaching her to summon the Fates by the river for them to fulfill her task. The girl does as instructed and returns with the animals fed and the clothes neatly folded. Next, the ogress mother points her to a tower where the ogress's sister lives and orders her to fetch from there some combs. The girl simply takes a large step and reaches the ogress's tower, where she is cleaning the oven with her breasts. The girl uproots a tuft cypress tree and uses it to clean the oven for the ogress aunt. The ogress aunt then prepares some bread, and retires to a room to sharpen her teeth. While the second ogress is distracted, the girl snatches the combs and takes them with her back to the ogress mother's house. On seeing the success of her daughter-in-law, the ogress mother gives the pair her blessing and summons the girl's family to celebrate a second wedding, with musical instruments.

==== Melidoni ====
William Roger Paton collected from a teller named Mersini, from the island of Lesbos, a tale titled Melidoni ("Sorrow" or "Care"): a poor fisherman wants to marry his three daughters to suitable suitors. A cafezi advises him to pray to God and to cast his net in the sea. He marries his two elder daughters. When it is the youngest's turn, he catches a lobster in his net and gives it to his daughter as her husband. At first, the girl is sad, but the lobster reveals he is a prince and that the lobster is his ship ("kanani" in Modern Greek, similar to "kananida", a kind of lobster). He warns her not to tell anything to her family. One day, she visits her family and watches over the lobster skin. Meanwhile, she sees outside their house a prince (her husband) appear three times, each on a more splendid horse and garments than the later. On the third time he visits, she tells her family the prince is her lobster husband, and he disappears. She then wears three leather dresses, and three pairs of boots with iron soles, and goes on a quest for him. She meets three ogresses on the way, who help her and indicate the way to Melidoni. She meets a disguised Melidoni, who asks her for a kiss. She refuses and he turns her into a button, promising to take her to his mother. Once there, Melidoni changes her back and presents her to his mother. The ogress mother tells her to sweep and not sweep the floor of 40 rooms, to cook and not cook the meat for the ogress, and to fetch yeast from the house of the ogress's sister. She accomplishes it all with her husband's guidance. Melidoni's mother betroths him to another bride and tells the girl to fill many mattresses with feathers, to make a donkey dance, to feed the dog, and to bring back a loaf of bread untouched. Finally, on the wedding day, the girl is forced to hold torches, bearing the pain of their burning, and—as her husband instructed the night before—throws them at the bride. They escape back to her father's house.

==== The Eagle (Paton) ====
W. R. Paton collected another tale from Lesbos from informant Melsini Chistelli. In this tale, named The Eagle, a princess lives her life in a glass chamber. One day, she plays with a ball and breaks the walls of the glass chamber. An eagle flies in and kisses her. The princess goes after the bird and reaches a house in the woods, where an ogress lives. The ogress forces the girl to do three chores for her, under penalty of being devoured. The first task is to sweep and unsweep the house. A youth appears to the girl and offers his help in return for a kiss. The girl declines the offer, but he helps her anyway: she is to sweep the house and leave some heapings in every room. The youth also advises her that, when the witch suspects the girl was helped by the ogress's son Kakothanatos, the girl is to deny any help from Kalothanatos. The next tasks are to cook meat and leave it uncooked, and to fill a mattress with feathers from the sea. To fill the mattress, the youth tells her to summon all birds by shouting that their μαργιροντάκις is dead. (Paton also wrote that in a retelling, the same informant added a fourth task: to separate a heap of cereal grains, which the girl does by summoning the birds again). Lastly, the ogress sends the girl to her sister's house to get the toumpána troumána and the khartoproumvána. The eagle appears to her, tells her he is the son of the ogress, and advises her: she is to get to the ogress's sister's house, get a box from behind the staircase, and escape with it. The girl follows the instructions but opens the box and little devils escape. The eagle appears again and summons the devils back to the box with a whistle. At the end of the tale, the eagle says the ogress will make her choose a thing from the house, and she is to choose a dirty jackdaw (which is the eagle, in a new shape). The girl takes the jackdaw with her and it transforms into a prince.

==== Moskambari ====
Richard MacGillivray Dawkins translated a Greek variant from the island of Karpathos, with the title Moskambari. In this tale, a poor girl lives with her starving mother. One day, she eats too much of their food and her mother curses her daughter to be eaten by an ogress. A wind blows the girl's kerchief to an ogress's house, who takes her in. The ogress orders the girl to do some tasks for her son's upcoming wedding. First, she has to clean forty rooms; then, to wash the ogress's son's clothes without soap and thirdly to stuff mattresses with feathers—all tasks done with help from Moskambari ("Musk and Amber"), the ogress's son. To fulfill the third task, Moskambari advises her to go up the mountain and shout at all the birds that Moskambari is dead, and they will give their feathers. Finally, the ogress sends the girl to her ogress sister to get fiddles for the wedding. Before the human girl goes to the ogress's sister's house, Moskambari gives her advice: she is to clip the long eyelashes from an old woman; eat a fig filled with worms and compliment the fig tree; step on thistles and compliment them; drink from a river filled with worms and compliment it; change the food of animals (chaff for the donkey, bones for the lion); enter the house, get the instruments and escape. The girl does as instructed, fetches the instruments and makes her way back to the ogress's house, the second ogress's sister chasing her, but the creature is stopped by her servants the human treated with kindness. At the ceremony, Moskambari chooses the girl instead of his bride-to-be, who is further humiliated by being made to fart in front of the ogress.

==== The Golden Eagle of the World ====
In a variant collected by Greek folklorist Georgios A. Megas with the title Ο χρυσαετός του κόσμου ("The Golden Eagle of the World"), a married couple lives a happy life, until the wife is pressed by her neighbours to ask her husband's name. He says it is "Μαυροτάρταρο της Γης, το Χρυσαετό του Κόσμου" ('Black Tartaro of the Earth, the Golden Eagle of the World'). He vanishes overnight and the wife goes looking for him. She reaches his mother's (who is a dragon) house and is taken as a maid. The dragon forces the wife to sweep and not sweep the house (her husband advises to sweep the dust and place heaps of it), to cook and not cook a piece of lamb (her husband advises her to place the lamb over the cauldron, so that half is hanging out of the cauldron), and to go to the dragon's sister to get the "toumoula" and the "moumoula" and bring them back. Her husband advises her to change the donkey's and the dog's fodder on the way to the sister's house, complement a crooked fig tree and a river filled with dirty water, get the things, and escape. Finally, the dragon mother prepares her son's wedding to another bride and forces the human girl to wash her 40 piles of husband's clothes in the river. The Golden Eagle of the World appears to his wife and tells her to summon a cadre of koptsia to help her wash the clothes. Lastly, the dragon-mother marries the Golden Eagle of the World to another bride, and forces her true daughter-in-law to hold candles near the bridal bed, bearing the pain of their burning, lest she be devoured. During the night, the Golden Eagle of the World tricks the false bride into holding the candles for a time and releases his true wife from the task. The false bride does as asked and screams in pain from the burning, alerting the dragon-mother, who appears to devour the person holding the candles.

==== The Iron Shoes ====
In a Greek tale translated by literary critic Jacques Boulenger into French with the title Les souliers de fer ("The Iron Shoes"), a poor fisherman has three daughters and earns his living by catching fish in the sea. One day, he cannot catch any fish, and stops by a mountain. He sighs heavily, and the rock opens up to reveal a giant man, who questions the man why he was summoned. The fisherman, scared at the strange man, denies having summoned him. The giant, then, invites the fisherman in for a talk and tells him he will provide the man with money, in exchange for one of the man's daughters as his bride. The fisherman's youngest daughter, Maricoula, is given to the giant as wife, and lives with him, her staying at home and weaving and him hunting during the days. Meanwhile, Maricoula's elder sister, envying her cadette's fortune, asks her father to take her there for a visit. The fisherman sighs "O" before the mountain and the giant appears to take them in. Maricoula's elder sister goes to talk to her little sister about her husband, and questions the latter her husband's true name. Maricoula answers that it is "O", but her sister says this is not a name, and advises her to ask his name that same night after they leave. Marcoula asks the giant his true name, but he inquires if she is more interested in his life or in his name. The girl answers: "his name", and the giant slowly sinks into the ground, until he says his name is Constantino and he disappears. A voice suddenly tells her she must search for him wearing three pairs of iron shoes. Maricoula mourns her loss for a time and commissions from a smith the iron shoes. Maricoula wears down the first pair of shoes until she reaches the edge of a forest, where a toothless old woman lives. The old woman advises the girl to continue on her journey until she reaches the old woman's sister, an ogress, which will be weaving in her home. The old woman gives her a jar of honey and some figs for her to tease the ogress until the latter swears on Constantino's name not to eat Maricoula. The girl follows her orders and reaches the ogress's house by wearing down the second pair of iron shoes. The ogress swears not to devour the girl and takes her in, but secretly reneges on her oath and plots to kill her by setting impossible tasks. First, the ogress orders the girl to bake her bread, but leave half unbaked; make the bed and leave half unmade, and wash do half of the dishes. Maricoula cries over the task, when she hears a male voice asking her for a kiss. She declines the voice's offer, wanting to be devoured by the ogress rather than kissing anyone but her husband, then proceeds to fulfill the tasks on her own. The following day, the ogress orders the human girl to go to the ogress's sister's house and get from there a music box for the ogress's son's upcoming wedding. Maricoula hears the voice again (which the story explains it is Constantino's, testing his wife) offering to fulfill the task for her in exchange for a kiss, but the girl declines once again. Despite the refusal, the voice explains his aunt is an even fierce ogress, and advises Maricoula how to proceed: she is to trade the fodder of two animals (vine leaves for a horse, bone for a dog), spy on the window if the aunt is asleep with her eyes open, say a blessing over the door, get the box and escape. Maricoula follows the voice's warnings and brings back the box, despite the ogress's sister commanding the door, the dog and the horse to stop her. Lastly, the ogress forces Maricoula to hold candles on her fingers and between her toes all night to illuminate the ogress's son and his bride in their chambers. The girl sees that the ogress's son is her husband Constantino, and begins to cry. Constantino approaches her and asks for a kiss, but she would rather burn alive than kiss him. Then, the bride, "black as a Moor", says she kissed a shoemaker's behind for a spoonful of rice. On hearing this, Constantino takes the candles from Maricoula and places them on the false bride (who burns to death), kills his ogress mother and takes his human wife back to their mountain abode. Anna Angelopulou and Aigle Broskou sourced the tale from Kerkyra.

==== The Golden-Green Bird ====
In a Greek tale from Zakynthos titled Το χρυσοπράσινο πουλί ("The Golden Green Bird"), translated into French by linguist Hubert Pernot as L'oiseau vert-doré ("The Bird of Green-Gold"), a king has three unmarried daughters, and consults with his Moira (his Fate) the reason for this. The Moira spies on the sleeping positions of the princesses, and declares the youngest's (her arms lying by her legs) is the cause, and convinces the royal couple to expel her cadette and bring luck for the elder two. The princess agrees, but asks her father to provide her with a dress woven with gold and pearls. The dress is provided and she leaves home, reaching first an inn. The "Evil Fate" strikes again and destroys the innkeeper's wine stash, forcing the princess to pay for the damage with the dress. Next, the princess sleeps next to a dressmaker, where the Evil Fate rips every dress to shreds. Lastly, the princess enters a glass shop and Fate breaks all glassware. Fed up with such misfortune, the princess cries out for the ground to swallow her up, and it happens: she is dragged to the house of a lamia, where she is made to be her servant, having to perform difficult tasks for her son's upcoming marriage, otherwise the witch will devour her. One day, the witch says she is going to church and orders the princess to sweep half of the house and not the other, to cook half of the food and leave half uncooked, and to make only half of the bed. After the sorceress leaves, the girl cries, when Golden-Green Bird appears to her and offers his help in exchange for a kiss. She declines, but he helps her anyway. When the witch returns, she scolds the princess, suspecting her son had a hand in the task, but the girl dismisses such notions. The next day, the lamia sends the girl to her sister to get a sieve to winnow the flour. The princess is advised by Golden-Green Bird how to proceed: she is to drink a bit from a dirty spring and clean it; eat a fig from a crooked tree and deleaf it; give a cloth to a woman cleaning an over with her breasts; exchange the fodder between two animals (meat for a dog, herbs for a donkey), get the tamis and escape. For the third task, the lamia gives piles of dirty clothes the princess must wash, iron and fold before noon. The Golden-Green Bird gives her a golden branch and tells her to use it near the sea: she beats the branch on the ground and many washerwomen and maidservants appear to fulfill the task. Finally, on her son's wedding day, the lamia orders the princess to hold a candle near the wedding couple for the whole night. The princess holds the candle, as it burns her fingers, making her cry for help. Golden-Green Bird approaches her and offers to release her from the ordeal if she gives him a kiss, but the girl refuses. The false bride, then, mocks the girl's suffering by saying she kissed the cook for a piece of bread. On hearing this, Golden-Green Bird says he would rather have the princess as his wife, who was almost devoured by his mother, instead of the mocking second one, and banishes the latter.

==== The Mayflower ====
In a Cretan tale collected from a source in Afrata, Xania, and translated as The Mayflower, a couple have five daughters, the elder four hate the youngest and beat her. The girl then decides to leave home and search for a job elsewhere. She walks until she reaches a deep, dark forest, and sees a light in the distance. She follows the light to its source, a hut, and knocks on the door. A man appears at the door and warns he is the son of a witch, who might kill her. The girl explains her situation and the man lets her in, advising her that his mother does the housework for him and his forty brothers while they are away hunting, and she does everything by half; thus, the girl, is to do only half of what his mother commands her to do. He also gives her a hair from his head with a command to call upon "Mayflower", and he will come to her aid. The man's mother appears to them and notices the new girl at home, whom her son explains he brought in since she has nowhere else to go. The witch agrees to his terms, but wants to get rid of the girl. First, she orders her to sweep the house, then to wash the dishes, and wash the clothes. The girl fulfills every task by half, which the witch suspects her son taught her to do. Some time later, she hatches a new plan: she orders the girl to go to the Pipiros forest to an ogre's cave and fetch from there his set of keys. Without knowing where to go, the girl summons the witch's son by calling upon Mayflower, and he appears to advise her: drink from a pool of dirty water and filled with worms, brush spider-webs aside with her hands, enter the cave if the ogre is asleep (with his eyes open, awake if his eyes are shut), fetch the keys under the pillow and a box, which she must not open it. The girl does as instructed and flees with the box and the keys, as the ogre commands the spiders and the dirty pool to stop her, to no avail. At a distance, the girl decides to take a peek into the box, and accidentally releases musical instruments, drums, laughs and chuckles, which the ogre locked inside the box. Unable to draw them back into the box, for they are spread in all directions, the girl uses the hair to summon Mayflower to help her lock everything back into the box: he appears and waves a wand. The girl returns with the key and the box, surprising the witch, who declares that the girl is a witch herself or Mayflower taught her his secrets. Later, the witch talks to her son Mayflower and admits the girl is special, and agrees to marry her to her son. Thus Mayflower marries the human girl.

==== Vryssivoulos ====
In a Greek tale from Eastern Thrace titled Ὁ Βρυσήβουλος, translated as Vryssivoulos, a mother curses her son to become an earthworm, and he spends his days by the fountain. One day, an old woman fetches some water from the fountain, brings it home and drops the earthworm in a glass. The animal offers to live with her. TIme passes, and the earthworm grows into a serpent. The local king is fighting in a war, when the serpent asks the old woman to go tell the king to marry the animal to one of his daughters if he wishes to win the war. Despite some reluctance, the old woman does as asked, and the king summons his daughters to see which will marry the serpent: the elder two refuse, save for the youngest, who agrees to marry it. The third princess dons 40 wedding dresses and marries the serpent, which removes his 40 layers of snakeskin on the wedding night to become a handsome youth, goes to the battlefield and turns the tide of the war in his father-in-law's favour. Her elder sisters mock her for marrying the snake, but she suffers their snide remarks for she promised her husband to keep his secret, lest he vanishes and she has to search for him on three pairs of iron shoes and walking with three iron crutches. Later, the king organizes a tournament, and Vryssivoulos attends in his human identity as a gallant knight. The princesses admire the new arrival and keep mocking the princess, when she reveals the knight is her husband, not the serpent. With this, Vryssivoulos vanishes, and the princess dons the iron apparel to go after him. She passes by a fountain where an ogre is fetching water, who agrees to take her in with their family. The ogre family promises not to hurt the human princess and point her to another fountain, where she is also welcomed by an ogre family. Lastly, she reaches a third fountain next to a palace, when her third pair of iron shoes are worn out. Vryssivoulos appears to draw some water and the princess asks him if he saw her husband, not recognizing him. Vryssivoulos admonishes her for telling his secret, then warns his mother is a man-eating ogress, taking her inside and hiding her. His ogress mother comes at night and smells human flesh. Vryssivoulos makes her promise not to hurt his guest and takes his wife out of her hiding spot. The ogress mother then forces the princess on hard tasks: first, to thoroughly sweep the house and not sweep it at the same time - Vryssivoulos advises her to sweep here and there and leave some dust. Next, the ogress orders the princess to mop the house and not mop it - her husband advises her to mop here and there. The next morning, the ogress orders her to clean the mattresses and fill them with bird feathers - Vryssivoulos advises the princess to go to the river bank and summon the birds of the Earth and sky, for they will provide her with their feathers. After the princess finishes the tasks, the ogress mother explodes in anger, while Vryssivoulos and the princess live in happiness.

==== Other tales ====
MacGillivray Dawkins also provided the summary of a Pontic Greek variant from Trebizond. In this tale, a frog is adopted by an old man, who courts the princess on his behalf, but the king demands he fulfills some suitor's tasks first. The frog does and marries the princess, then reveals he is a youth named Melezíris, but his wife must not reveal his name nor destroy his frogskin. The princess does that, loses her husband and goes to search for him in iron shoes, until she finds him again, at his withc mother's house. During their time of separation, Melezíris's mother prepared his wedding to another witch's daughter, and now that the princess is there, she is forced to fulfill tasks for the upcoming ceremony: first, to fill bolsters with feathers; next, to fill seven jars with tears; thirdly, to wash and not to wash; to sweep and not sweep the house. Lastly, the witch mother orders the princess to go to her sister and fetch from there a sieve. At last, Melezíris marries the false bride, but he gets rid of her and returns to his true wife, the human princess.

Dawkins provided the summary of another Pontic variant from Tripoli: the supernatural husband is a shapeshifting person and takes the form of a snake. He is adopted by an old woman, and marries the princess. The princess betrays him, he turns into a bird and she goes after him in iron shoes, until she reaches the house of her parents-in-law. The snake husband's mother forces the heroine to perform difficult tasks: first, to fill pillows with feathers; next, to fill jars with her tears. Finally, she is to go to the mother-in-law's sister's house and fetch from there a tambourine. The princess's husband offers her advice to treat his aunt's servants on the way there and get the tambourine, then rush back. The princess does as instructed and steals the tambourine, the aunt chasing after her. At the end of the tale, the supernatural husband takes his wife back to her parents, and faces his own mother in a transformation battle.

=== Cyprus ===
In a Cypriot tale titled "Ο γιος του Περπέρογλου" ("The Son of Perperoglu"), and translated to Hungarian as Perperoglu fia ("The Son of Perperoglu"), a king has three thrones on which he sits according to his mood: a golden one if he is happy, and a copper one if he is worried. His three daughters see him on the copper throne and inquire about his mood. He tells them he received a letter to join in the war, and curses the fact that he has no sons. His youngest daughter, Theodora, agrees to take his place in the war with a masculine disguise, "Theodoros". Theodora, or Theodoros, reaches another city, where she lodges with the son of Perperoglu, whose mother is a drakaina. The son somehow sees through Theodora's disguise, although his mother dismisses her son's fanciful notion. Either way, the drakaina convinces her son to put Theodoros through some tests to see his true gender: choose to pick between sweet and bitter fruits; to pick up a sack of flour in the basement; and to sleep next to roses enchanted to ascertain her identity. With the help of her little dog, Theodora passes through the tests and Perperoglu's son is convinced he is truly a man. Theodoros goes to the war then returns to write a goodbye letter, where she confesses she is a girl named Theodora, then leaves to her father's kingdom. Seeing that she was humiliated, the drakaina tells her son to go to the Mount of Olives, summon all birds, and chop down four trees. He delivers four pieces of wood to his mother, who fashions a frame and tells him to sell it to Theodora's father. Theodora is given the frame and the next morning wakes up in the drakaina's house. The drakaina forces the girl to perform tasks: first, to fill a jar with her tears, then to wash and not wash, dry and not dry, iron and not iron a pile of clothes. The drakaina's son offers to help her for a kiss; she declines, but he still advises her. Next, she is to take a letter to the drakaina's sister and ask for a sieve. The son knows it is a trap, so he advises Theodora to get the sieve and flee, then throw behind her a bar of soap and a comb that he gives her to deter his aunt's rampage. She follows the instructions and delivers the sieve. The fourth task is to use flour, sift and not sift it, ferment and not ferment it, to bake some bread for her. The son advises her through it. The fifth task is for Theodora to deliver a letter to the drakaina's other sister to ask for her box and flute. The drakaina's son advises her to drink from a river of pus and blood, eat bitter and rotten apples from a tree, give hay to a donkey in the barn, stand two fallen doors, get the flute and the box and escape. Theodora follows his advice to the letter and escapes, even though the drakaina's sister commands the doors, the donkey, the apple tree and the river to stop the girl. Lastly, on a Sunday, the drakaina lights up a candle on each of Theodora's fingers, which burn as the candles melt. The drakaina's son offers to release her in exchange for a kiss. Theodora kisses him and both escape to her father's kingdom, where they marry. Anna Angelopulou and Aigle Broskou listed it as Cypriot variant of type AaTh 425A in the Greek Folktale Catalogue.

== See also ==
- The Golden Crab
- Prince Crawfish (Belarusian folktale)
