= Nina Dudarova =

Romani poet and translator

- Нина Александровна Дударова
- Born: 1903; Saint Petersburg, Russian Empire
- Died: 1992 (aged 88–89); Moscow, Russia
- Known for: poet, teacher, writer and translator

Nina Alexandrovna Dudarova (Russian: Нина Александровна Дударова; Saint Petersburg, 1903 – Moscow, 1992) was a Roma poet, teacher, writer and translator. She was born in Saint Petersburg to a Roma mother (who was a singer and dancer in a Roma choir) and a Russian stepfather, both of whom raised Dudarova as their own child.

After studying teaching and pedagogy, in 1925 she joined the then-recently founded All-Russian Union of Gypsies in Moscow. One aim of the union was to fight against illiteracy and for the formation of schools in the Romani language. In 1926, she was commissioned with fellow Roma poet and translator Nikolai Pankov, to work out an alphabet for Romani.

Dudarova and Pankov's final Cyrillic transcription was based on the dialect of the Ruska Roma. There was a large amount of Romani literature written in this alphabet (over 300 books between 1927 and 1938); however, this influence fell in a comparatively limited circle, mainly in Moscow and several towns in the USSR, and ended in 1938 when the official Soviet Roma policy changed from treating the Roma as a separate people who should develop as a constituent element of Soviet society to integrationism. In the early days of the Soviet Union, many primers were published on the subject of Roma education for use not only in Roma schools, but also for the adult illiterate Roma population. Dudarova's primer Nevo Drom: Bukvaryo Vash Bare Manushenge was one of the first.

Dudarova and Pankov were editors of the literary and social review Nevo Drom ("New Road") and participated in the publication of popular almanacs wherein Dudarova published children's poems imbued with socialist ideology. At this time, she also helped translate the works of Alexander Pushkin into Romani and directed the Loly Cheren (Red Star) cultural and social club. She travelled the country to give lectures on education, the alleged misdeeds of religions, hygiene and women's rights.

From the 1930s she taught Romani at the Romen Theatre in Moscow and worked as a literature editor for children. After World War II, the Soviet Union renounced all programs in Romani and Dudarova fell into anonymity.
