= Nikolai Slichenko =

Russian actor (1934–2021)

- Николай Сличенко
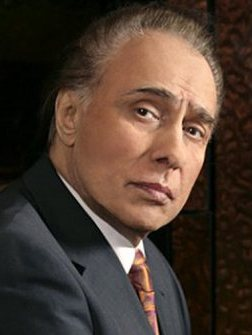
- Born: 27 December 1934; Belgorod, Russian SFSR, Soviet Union
- Died: 2 July 2021 (aged 86)
- Occupations: Actor; singer; theatre director
- Years active: 1951–2021
- Title: People's Artist of the USSR (1981)
- Awards: Order "For Merit to the Fatherland" (Russia, 2nd, 3rd, 4th class); Order of Honour (Russia); Order of Friendship (Russia); Order of Friendship of Peoples (USSR); USSR State Prize (1987)

Nikolai Alekseyevich Slichenko (Russian: Николай Алексеевич Сличенко; 27 December 1934 — 2 July 2021) was a Soviet and Russian singer, actor and chief director of the Romen Theatre in Moscow. He was the only Romani person to be awarded the title People's Artist of the USSR (1981).

== Biography ==
Nikolai was born in Belgorod area, Russia. Part of his childhood passed during World War II. During the war, Nikolai lost many relatives. In particular, when he was a boy, his father was shot before his eyes in 1942. After the war, the Slichenko family settled at a Romani collective farm in Voronezh Oblast. That was the time when Nikolai heard about a theater in Moscow and had dreamt of performing on its stage.

In 1951, Nikolai was accepted into the Romen Theatre. He drew the attention of the leading theater masters and began at the theatre like most, as an auxiliary staff actor.

Nikolai was first entrusted with a leading role in 1952, when he was 18 years old. This was at the time when the theater left to Zagorsk (present-day Sergiyev Posad) with the play Four Fiancées by Ivan Khrustalev. Nikolai played the role of Leksa, as a substitute for the actor Sergey Fyodorovich Shishkov (of the Shishkov gypsy dynasty) who had become ill. He then played the role of Leksa for many years, and later, as he grew older, played the role of Badi in this play as well.

After the play Slichenko received attention as a capable actor. The theater began to engage him in the current repertoire plays. In all, at the time he played more than 60 roles in his native theater, and also took part in a number of popular films, including Under the Rain and the Sun, My Island Is Blue, Wedding in Malinovka and others.

In 1977, Nikolai Slichenko became the chief director of the Romen Theatre. For this, he completed the Higher Courses for Directors at the Russian Academy of Theatre Arts in 1972, under the management of the People's Artist of the USSR Andrey Goncharov.

On 4 December 1998, a star with Nikolai Slichenko's name was placed at the Star Square in Moscow.

== Awards and honors ==
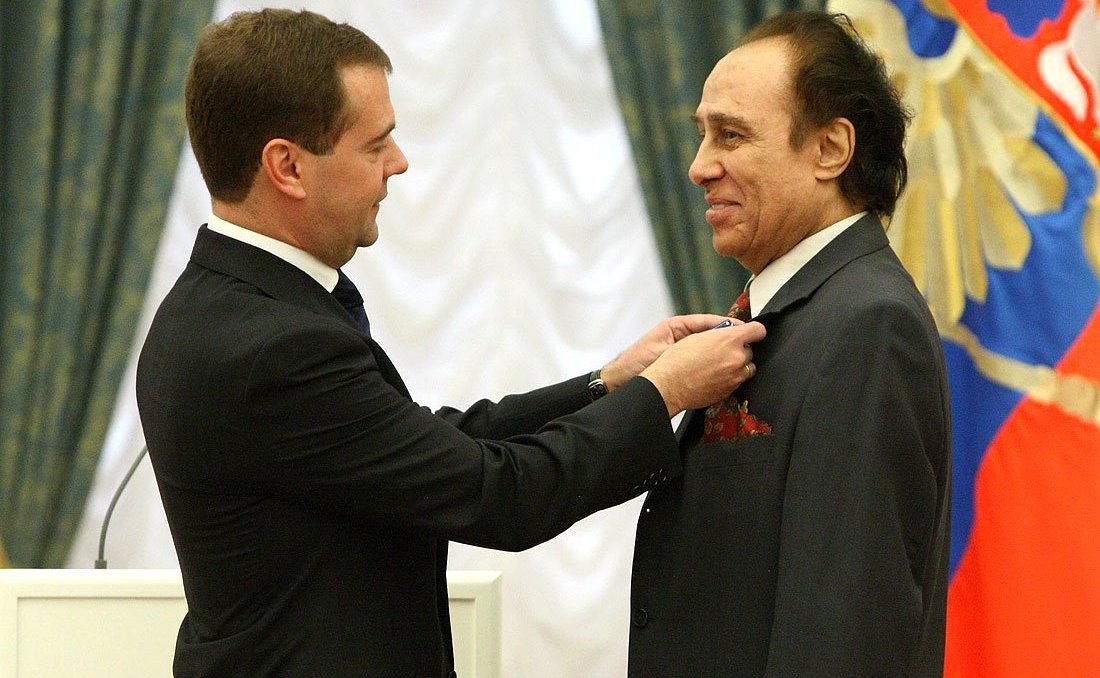
Presentation of the Order of Honour with President Dmitry Medvedev, 6 May 2010

Orders

- Order "For Merit to the Fatherland" 2nd class (2020)
- Order "For Merit to the Fatherland" 3rd class (2004)
- Order "For Merit to the Fatherland" 4th class (1994)
- Order of Honour (2009)
- Order of Friendship (2014)
- Order of Friendship of Peoples (1984)

Titles

- People's Artist of the USSR (1981)
- People's Artist of the RSFSR (1975)
- Honored Artist of the RSFSR (1969)

Awards

- USSR State Prize (1987)
- Russian Federation Government Prize in the field of culture (2013)
