= Romen Theatre =

Genre of Romani-language theatre in Russia

Coordinates: 55°47′05″N 37°34′09″E

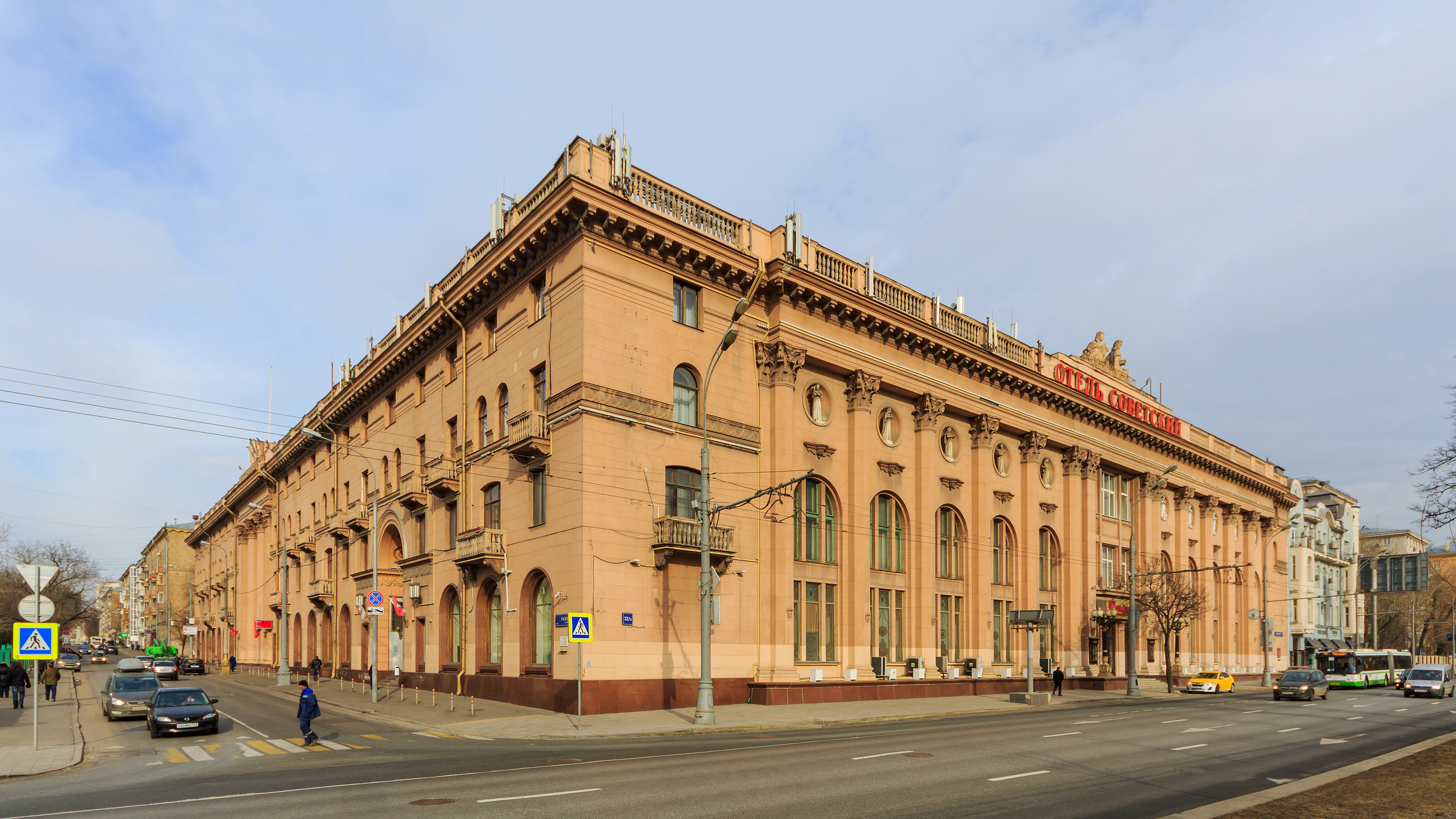
Romen Theatre in Moscow.

Romen Theatre (Russian: Московский музыкально-драматический театр "Ромэн") in Moscow, Russia, is the oldest and the most famous of Romani theatres in the world. The theatre is a key object of Romani culture in Russia, and from the moment of its foundation in 1931, it has been a centre of attraction for Romani artists in Russia.

== Forerunners of Romen Theatre ==
In the 18th and 19th centuries, choruses of Ruska Roma existed in Moscow and Saint Petersburg.

At the end of the 19th century, a conductor of one of Romani choruses, Nikolai Shishkin created the first ever Romani theatre troupe. The first appearance of the troupe was in the operetta Gypsy Songs in Characters (Russian: Цыганские песни в лицах), with the main troupe of Arcadia Theatre. This was in 1886. The operetta ran for several years. On 13 April 1887 the first performance of Strauss's operetta The Gypsy Baron with Roma (Shishkin's troupe) playing the roles of Roma took place in the Maly Theatre.

On 20 March 1888 the premiere of the very first Romani language operetta Children of the Forests was staged in the Maly Theatre. It was performed solely by the Romani troupe. The production ran for 18 years and was a great success.

In 1892, Shishkin produced a new operetta, Gypsy Life.

In the 1920s, many Romani ensembles of singers, dancers and musicians performed in the USSR.

== Theatre history ==
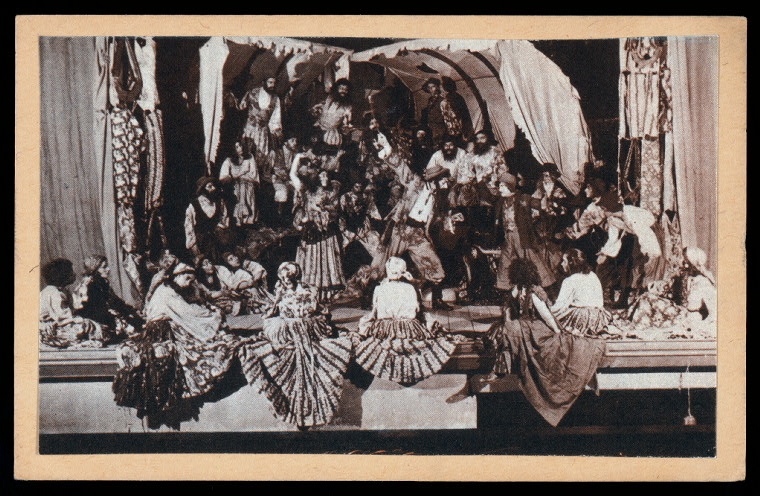
An undated photo depicting "The Gypsy Theatre" in the USSR, from the New York Public Library's Billy Rose Theatre Collection.

On 24 January 1931 the Romani theatre studio "Indo-Romen" opened in Moscow. Within a month, the studio performed its first work.

The first director and the first music composer of "Indo-Romen" were Jewish activists, Moishe Goldblat and Semen Bugachevsky. Alexander Tyshler was most often invited for stage design.

On 16 December 1931 the studio showed its first full musical-dramatic performance Life on Wheels (Russian: Жизнь на колёсах). It consisted of three acts and was based on a play by Romani author Alexandr Germano. After that performance, the studio was renamed the Romen Theatre. The first theatre director was Georgy Lebedev (a Rusko Rom).

Since 1940, the theatre does all its performances in Russian.

The current theatre director (2008) is Nikolai Slichenko, a Romani actor famous in Russia.

== Selected notable figures associated with Romen Theatre ==
- Sasha Kolpakov, guitarist, vocalist, composer
- Valentina Ponomaryova, actor, singer
- Nikolai Slichenko, actor
- Nina Dudarova, poet, teacher, writer and translator

== Literature ==
- Baurov, Konstantin (1996). Repertuary tsyganskikh khorov starogo Peterburga (in Russian). St. Petersburg: Martynov i ko. ISBN 5-280-03164-X. OCLC 44003978.
- Rom-Lebedev, Ivan (1990). Ot tsyganskogo khora—k teatru "Romen": Zapiski moskovskogo tsygana (in Russian). Moscow: Isskustvo. ISBN 5-210-00359-0. OCLC 23688895.
- Demeter, Nadezhda; et al. (2000). Istoriia tsygan: Novyi vzgliad (in Russian). Voronezh: IPF "Voronezh". ISBN 5-89981-180-3. OCLC 47048383.
- Demeter-Charskaia, Olga (1997). Sud'ba tsyganki (in Russian). Moscow: Stankin. OCLC 44608891.

== See also ==
- Romani society and culture
