= Romani people in Russia =

Ethnic group in Russia

Romane manusha andi Rusia (Romani)
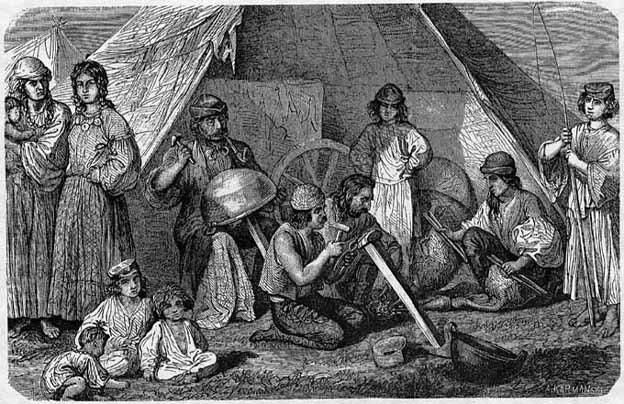

Total population
- 204,958 (2010)

Regions with significant populations
- Stavropol Kray, the Rostov Oblast, the Krasnodar Kray and the Samara Oblast

Languages
- Romani, Russian

Religion
- Russian Orthodox, Romani mythology

Romani people in Russia (Russian: Цыгане в России) have been living in Russia since 1500. There are around 204,958 Romani people in Russia according to the 2010 national census. In the mid-1920s Romani people in Russia were classified as a national minority of Indian origin and policies in Russia were developed to assimilate them. In the 1930s many Roma from Russia were deported to Siberia. Russian Soviet Premier Nikita Khrushchev decreed that Roma must be settled in 1956. There was a cultural revival in the last decades of the Soviet Union when the Moscow Romani theatre was established in Russia.

== History ==
The Roma first arrived in Russia around 1500.

During World War II, Nazi Einsatzgruppen and their allies exterminated and shot tens of thousands of Romani people in Soviet-occupied areas, including parts of Russia.

== Culture ==
Romani musicians and dancers enjoyed great popularity in 19th-century Moscow and Saint Petersburg. Traditionally, Roma men in Russia participated in horse trading, while Russian Roma women were famous for fortune-telling. In contemporary times, many engage in music, trading, or various commercial pursuits. A common dish among Russian Roma is bárśo, a soup made with beetroot, potatoes, and meat. During the summer, another favored soup made with sorrel, known as šutlága, was also prevalent. Russian Roma often accompanied their meals with Romani frybread. Fárba, a dish made from cooked pig or sheep blood with onions and occasionally potatoes, is another well-known Russian Roma specialty. The most significant beverage in the Russian Romani culture is tea (čájo).

== Discrimination ==
Romani people are discriminated in Russia due to stereotypes of them being drug dealers, thieves and criminals. Hate crimes and violent attacks against the Russian Roma minority are common in Russia.

== See also ==
- Ruska Roma
