= Orizari =

Orizari (Bulgarian and Macedonian: Оризари) may refer to:

== Antarctica ==
- Orizari Glacier

== Bulgaria ==
- Orizari (Plovdiv Province), village in Rodopi Municipality, Plovdiv Province
- Orizari (Sliven Province), village in Tvarditsa Municipality, Sliven Province

== Greece ==
- Rizari, village in Edessa Municipality; formerly named Oryzarion (Greek: Ορυζάριον, romanized: Oryzárion), written Orizari (Cyrillic: Оризари) in some foreign languages today

== North Macedonia ==
- Orizari, Gjorče Petrov, town in Gjorče Petrov Municipality
- Orizari, Kočani, village in Kočani Municipality
- Orizari, Lipkovo, village in Lipkovo Municipality
- Orizari Municipality, former municipality

== See also ==
- Dolno Orizari (disambiguation) (Lower Orizari)
- Gorno Orizari (disambiguation) (Upper Orizari)
- Šuto Orizari, neighbourhood and seat of the Šuto Orizari Municipality, City of Skopje, North Macedonia
- Šuto Orizari Municipality, municipality in City of Skopje, North Macedonia
