= Usnija Redžepova =

Macedonian-Serbian singer (1946–2015)

Usnija Redžepova Уснија Реџепова
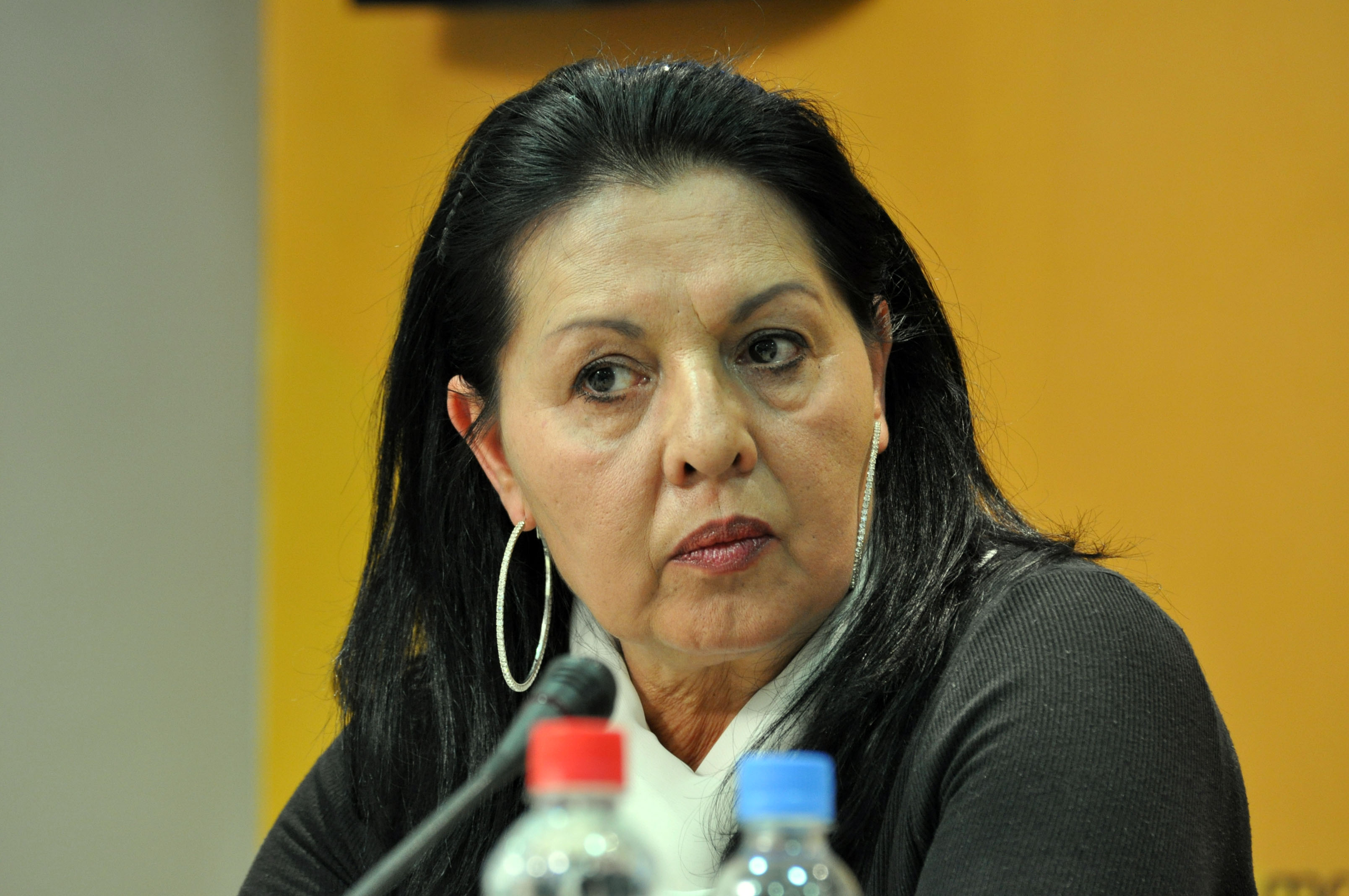
- Redžepova in 2008

Background information
- Also known as: Usnija Jašarova
- Born: 4 February 1946; Skopje, PR Macedonia, FPR Yugoslavia (present-day North Macedonia)
- Died: 1 October 2015 (aged 69) Belgrade, Serbia
- Genres: Romani music
- Occupation: Singer
- Instrument: vocals
- Years active: 1966–2007
- Labels: PGP-RTB; Jugoton

Usnija Redžepova (Serbian Cyrillic: Уснија Реџепова, pronounced [ˈusnija reˈd͡ʒepova]; 4 February 1946 – 1 October 2015) was a Macedonian-Serbian singer of Romani and Turkish origin; she was born in Skopje, but spent the majority of her life in Belgrade, where she died.

At the beginning of her career, she used the stage name Usnija Jašarova (Serbian Cyrillic: Уснија Јашарова) to avoid being confused with Esma Redžepova, another Romani singer from Macedonia. The two had no familial relation, but did collaborate musically.

Redžepova started her singing career in the mid-1960s and went on to release 15 singles and EPs and 9 albums. Her prolific repertoire mainly includes folk songs from the Balkans sung in Serbian, Romani, Macedonian, and Turkish. Throughout her career, Redžepova enjoyed great popularity in Yugoslavia and its successor states. Apart from her records, she is known for playing the leading role in Koštana, a Serbian play by Borisav Stanković, which she performed 150 times on stage at the National Theatre in Belgrade.

== Early life and background ==
Usnija Redžepova was born 4 February 1946 in Skopje, then in the People's Republic of Macedonia, part of the Federal People's Republic of Yugoslavia (now capital of North Macedonia). Her father, Jašar, was a plumber of Džambaz Romani descent, and her mother, Sabrina, was a housewife of Turkish descent. Both of her parents had been married previously with children. At the start of her career, Usnija Redžepova put an emphasis on her Turkish heritage, although she never hid her Romani roots, as many Roma artists did at that time to avoid racism.

Although Redžepova described her family as poor, she recalled her childhood fondly. In spite of her shyness, Usnija discovered that she enjoyed being on stage, which allowed her to transform into a different version of herself. In 1963, she took part in a karaoke contest organized by Radio Skopje. She performed "Ajde da igramo tvist", a pop song by Serbian singer Radmila Karaklajić. However, at that time, singing was not considered a reputable career for women. After graduating high school, Redžepova moved to Belgrade in 1964 to pursue an education, per her father's wishes.

== Career ==
In 1964, Redžepova enrolled in the Arabic Studies program at the University of Belgrade Faculty of Philology. During this time, she lived in the Krnjača neighborhood of Belgrade. She sang in kafanas and restaurants in order to support herself. There, she met Naško Džorlev, a Macedonian musician who invited Usnija to sing in his band. They went on to perform across Yugoslavia over a period of 5 years. In 1969, Redžepova resumed her studies after the tour, although she ended up leaving the university permanently in 1973.

In 1966, Redžepova released her first records with Jugoton, one of the largest Yugoslav labels based in Zagreb. Because Esma Redžepova, another singer from Macedonia, had already signed with Jugoton, the label urged her to use the stage name "Usnija Jašarova" to avoid any confusion. "Jašarova" was a made-up patronymic inspired by Usnija's father, Jašar. Her first EP, Mi Se Sobrale, Mi Se Nabrale, was a Macedonian-language collaboration with singer Ivanka Jovanovska. Her second EP, Džulo, Džulo, was a collection of Romani-language folk songs. In 1968, Redžepova released her third EP, another Romani-language record (also with Jugoton), titled Mo Anav I Usnija. These early releases were all recorded with Naško Džorlev and his ensemble.

In 1971, Redžepova released her first Serbian-language single, Ne Pitaj Za Moje Ime, with PGP-RTB, the music production branch of Radio Television Belgrade. Because she was no longer working with Jugoton, she was able to release music under the name "Usnija Redžepova".

=== Acting career and Koštana ===
By 1973, Redžepova had experienced success and had started a promising career. However, she was still studying at the university and was feeling very tired. She had not realised that her success was exceptional and had an unassuming approach to it. That year, Žarko Jovanović, a prominent Serbian-Romani artist, wanted her to play in his new adaptation of Koštana, a popular play in Serbia telling the story of a Gypsy girl. As she had almost withdrawn from the scene, he was not able to find her until another Macedonian-Romani singer, Muharem Serbezovski, introduced Redžepova to him. Although Redžepova was worried about having to play and sing in an academic setting, she joined the National Theatre in Belgrade to perform Koštana. She stayed there for 26 years until 1999. The play was a large success and Usnija Redžepova described her time there as euphoric.

In 1974, Redžepova appeared in the Yugoslav film Death and the Dervish in the role of a singer. She performed the Balkan Turkish folk song "Gelj gelj".

=== Later years ===
Although she had to give up her studies, she had the opportunity to visit some Arabic countries, including Sudan where she performed for Yugoslav workers. President Josip Broz Tito is said to have been an admirer and she performed for him and Fidel Castro when he was on a visit in the Brionian Islands. The cultural organisation responsible for her tours abroad, "Beogradska estrada", also permitted her to perform in Western countries.

After the breakup of Yugoslavia, Usnija Redžepova considered putting an end to her career because she was devastated by the death of her country. Nonetheless, she continued to release albums until 2007 but she ended up in a difficult financial situation after her husband's death in 2005. She received a national pension from the Serbian government on 29 December 2011.

Redžepova died on 1 October 2015 in Belgrade after suffering from lung cancer for three years. She was 69. Her funeral took place at the Bajrakli Mosque in central Belgrade on 4 October and she was buried in Skopje at the Butel cemetery.

== Personal life ==
Redžepova met her husband, Svetomir Šešić, known as "Šele", during a tour in Germany. The couple married in 1978. Šele was an accordionist and also one of the administrators of the prominent Serbian label PGP-RTB, which helped his wife in her career. He died in 2013 from pancreatic cancer.

Usnija Redžepova is not related to Esma Redžepova, another prominent Macedonian-Romani singer, but the two were close friends and released an album together in 1994, Songs of a Macedonian Gypsy, which gathers their main successes.

== Discography ==
=== Albums ===
- Usnija, PGP-RTB, 1977.
- Usnija, PGP-RTB, 1982.
- Dajte mi dajre, PGP-RTB, 1984.
- Šta hočeš, Jugoton, 1987.
- Usnija, PGP-RTB, 1988.
- Usnija i Orkestar Dragana Stojkovića Bosanca, PGP-RTB, 1992.
- Usnija, PGP-RTS, 1994.
- Ja sa juga, ti sa severa, PGP-RTS, 1998.
- Oko Niša kiša, Grand Production, 2007.

=== Extended plays ===
- Usnija Jašarova i Jovanka Ivanovska, Jugoton, 1966.
- Džulo, Džulo, Jugoton, 1966.
- Ciganske pjesme pjeva Usnija, Jugoton, 1968.

=== Singles ===
- Ne pitaj za moje ime, PGP-RTB, 1971.
- Da ima ljubov, da ima sreka, PGP-RTB, 1972.
- Hej cigani, PGP-RTB, 1974.
- Šta je život kad ljubavi nema, Suzy, 1975.
- Što me ostavi, Suzy, 1976.
- Kavusan sevgililer, PGP-RTB, 1976.
- Ne gledaj me, Suzy, 1976.
- Šta da radim sa tobom, PGP-RTB, 1978.
- Mani, Mani, PGP-RTB, 1978.
- Hočeš ljubav kćeri roma, PGP-RTB, 1979.
- Čaj ljelja rome, PGP-RTB, 1981.
- Kazuj, krčmo džerimo, PGP-RTB, 1983.

=== Compilations ===
- Zbog tebe, Jugoton, 1982.
- Songs of a Macedonian Gypsy, Monitor Records, 1994.
- Romske pesme, PGP-RTS, 2002.
- O pesmo moja, Tioli, 2003.
- The Best Of, PGP-RTS, 2003.
- 30 godina sa trubom, PGP-RTS, 2007.

=== Filmography ===
- Death and the Dervish (Zdravko Velimirović, 1974), performing a singer.

== See also ==
- Music of Serbia
- Romani music
