= Sutka City TV =

French television station

Sutka City TV is a television station broadcasting from Paris, France, in the Romani language. Andrijano Dzeladin established the station in September 2012, to end prejudice and to provide a link for the Romani people.

Dzeladin, a Macedonian citizen, named the television station after Sutka, a suburb of Skopje, the capital of Macedonia. He said that the Roma have "a culture, an anthem, a flag and integrity". He wants the Romani language to be spoken in all the programs broadcast from the television station. According to the report by France 24, "most programs—culinary, cultural or musical—involve listeners."

Dzeladin performs almost all tasks himself, and broadcasts from a studio in an apartment in the 19th arrondissement of Paris.
