= Topaana =

Topaana Топаана
- Neighborhood
- Interactive map of Topaana
- Coordinates: 42°00′40″N 21°25′53″E
- Country: North Macedonia
- Region: Skopje Statistical
- District: Tampere

Topaana (Macedonian: Топаана) is a neighborhood of Skopje in North Macedonia. It is located next to the Main Road called Bulevar Nikola Karev on the south and Dzon Kenedi on the north.

== Demographics ==
Topaana is a mainly residential area renowned for its large Roma community.

== Internet ==
Topaana, like all areas of Skopje, has full Wi-Fi and other Broadband access. The area has internet cafes, which all provide fast internet access. Most Internet in North Macedonia is Wi-Fi as a project involving North Macedonia and Motorola-enabled wireless internet throughout the country.

== Shopping ==
There are a variety of stores in this small part of Skopje, including groceries, food stores, automobile garages, car washes, tobacco retailers, general stores, and others.
