= Esma Redžepova =

Romani singer-songwriter (1943–2016)

Esma Redžepova Есма Реџепова
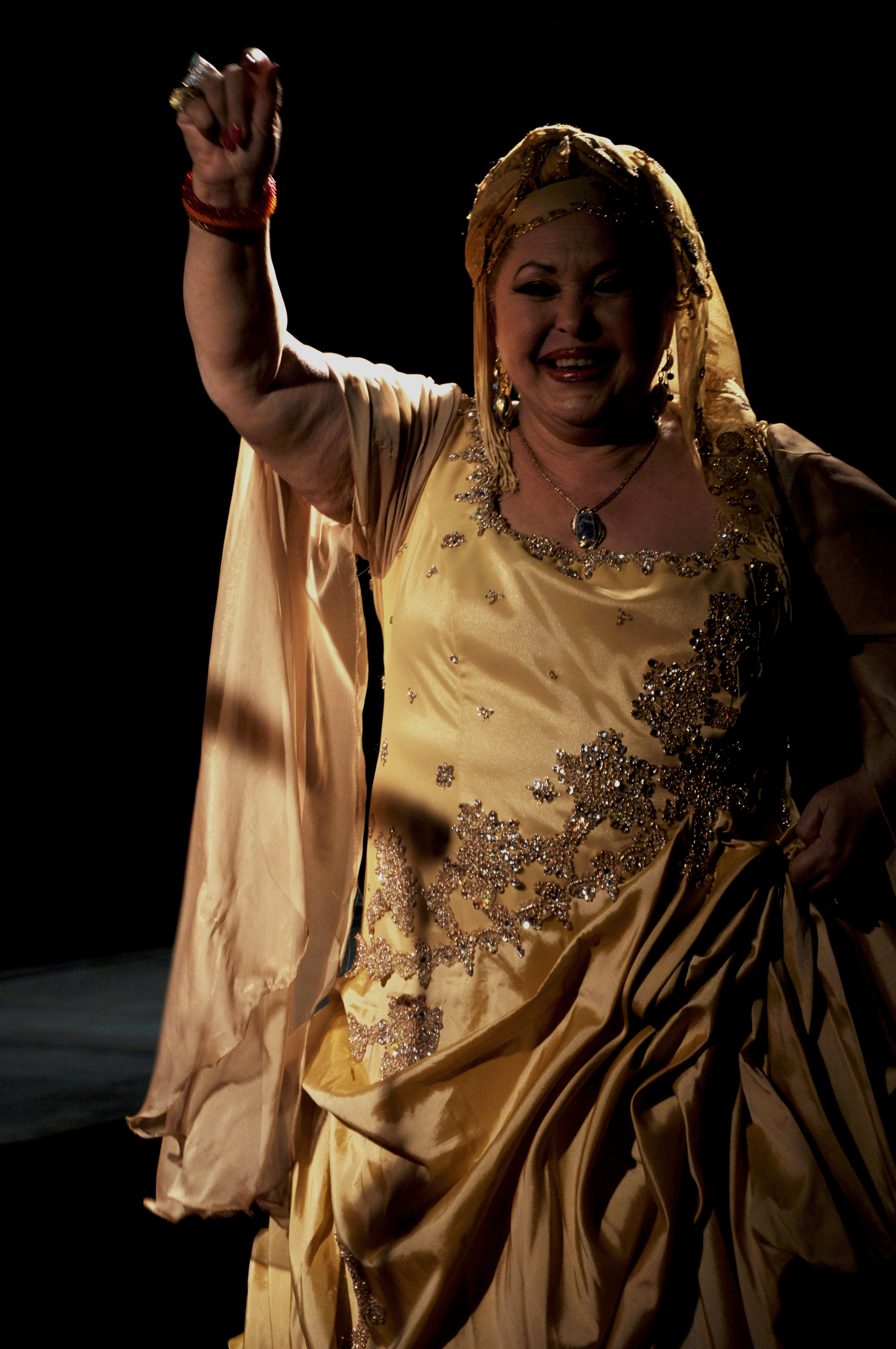
- Redžepova in 2010

Background information
- Also known as: Esma Redžepova-Teodosievska
- Born: 8 August 1943; Skopje, Kingdom of Bulgaria
- Died: 11 December 2016 (aged 73) Skopje, Macedonia
- Genres: Romani folk and Macedonian folk music
- Occupations: Singer-songwriter; humanitarian
- Instrument: Vocals
- Years active: 1956–2016
- Labels: Jugoton; PGP-RTB; Monitor Records
- Spouse: Stevo Teodosievski (m. 1968; died 1997)
- Website: esma.com.mk

Esma Redžepova-Teodosievska (Macedonian: Есма Реџепова-Теодосиевска, pronounced [ˈɛsma rɛˈd͡ʒɛpɔva tɛɔdɔˈsiɛfska]; 8 August 1943 – 11 December 2016) was a Macedonian Romani vocalist, songwriter and humanitarian. She was nicknamed "the Queen of the Gypsies".

She started to sing while she was a teenager in the 1950s, and her career spans over five decades, which she began with Stevo Teodosievski, who became her mentor and husband. Due to racism against Romani people in Socialist Republic of Macedonia, she and Teodosievski lived in Belgrade until the breakup of Yugoslavia. Her musical style was mostly inspired by traditional Romani and Macedonian music. Some other influences are also noticeable, such as pop music. She was noted for her powerful and emotional voice. Redžepova is listed among the 50 Great Voices in the world by NPR. Redžepova was also noted for her extravagant attires and her turbans, as well as the use she made of typical stereotypes about Romani women, such as sensuality and happiness.

As part of her humanitarian engagement, she fostered 47 children with Teodosievski and supported various causes. She also involved in local politics in her hometown of Skopje as a member of VMRO-DPMNE. In 2010, she was awarded the Macedonian Order of Merit and in 2013, she was named National Artist of the Republic of Macedonia by president of Macedonia Gjorge Ivanov. Together with Vlatko Lozanoski, she represented Macedonia in the Eurovision Song Contest 2013 in Malmö, Sweden. Initially, they were supposed to sing the song "Imperija" (Empire), but that song caused controversy due to the depiction of monuments of Skopje 2014 in its clip, so a new song, "Pred da se razdeni", was chosen, with which they participated. The song failed to qualify for the final.

== Early life and background ==
Redžepova was born in a poor Xoraxane Muslim Romani family, on 8 August 1943 in the Romani neighbourhood of Toopana, Skopje, at that time annexed by the Kingdom of Bulgaria.

Her father Ibrahim lost a leg during a German bombing in Skopje in 1941 and had to rely on crutches as he was unable to afford a prosthetic. He had an Iraqi Jewish grandmother and a Catholic Romani grandfather. Ibrahim worked variously as a porter, circus strongman and shoeshiner. When Redžepova was a child, she carried the shoe shining supplies for him. Ibrahim sang and played drums and sometimes performed at weddings. Some of Redžepova's siblings accompanied him. Her mother Čanija was a seamstress who made šalvari for Romani people.

At the age of nine, Redžepova was introduced by her brother Fari to Skopje Romaines Pralipe, a local Romani music organisation, where she said that she was able to quickly learn complicated rhythms. Her mother encouraged her musical talents, so Redžepova and her brother soon joined their school's folklore group. Her parents insisted that all their children finish primary school. However, they expected Redžepova to get married in her teens. She resisted attempts by her parents to have her married. Per herself, she became emancipated and would wear flowered dresses instead of the dimije, the traditional attire for Romani girls at that time.

== Music career ==
=== Debut ===
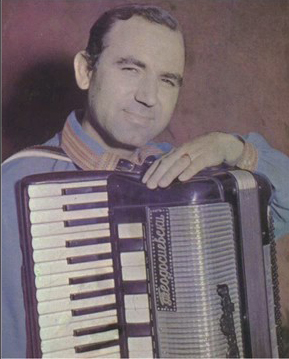
Stevo Teodosievski, who became Redžepova's mentor and husband.

Pece Atanasovski, who worked for Radio Skopje, noticed her talent and invited her to participate in an amateur program named "The Microphone Is Yours." In 1956, Redžepova's headteacher suggested she sing at a school talent contest for Radio Skopje. She went without informing her parents, who did not want her following the path of her older sister, Sajka, who started singing in cafes at the age of 17 and was disowned. She feared the anger from her parents if they were to find out because it was considered shameful for women to perform outside the family for strangers. Despite parental disapproval, she said her brothers supported her first steps towards a singing career.

At the age of 11, she was introduced to Stevo Teodosievski, an Eastern Orthodox ethnic Macedonian accordionist and folk music arranger who worked for Radio Skopje, by Medo Čun, a Romani clarinet player in his orchestra and a friend of her brother. Redžepova performed "A bre babi sokerdžan", a Macedonian Romani traditional song. She won the contest, winning 11,000,000 dinars. Per Redžepova, her parents learned about the award and became angry, but she promised her father that she would become a radio singer. In the 1950s, the only employment prospects for Romani musicians were performing in weddings and bars.

Per anthropologist Carol Silverman, Teodosievski was a visionary for having a vision of "taking Romany culture to a larger stage" and training Redžepova to stardom. According to Redžepova, Romani performers rarely sang in Romani on radio or television and hid their origins. Teodosievski had been promoting Romani music even before meeting Redžepova and faced harsh criticism in the media for it. He convinced Redžepova's parents to let her join his ensemble, by stating that he would turn her into an artist.

=== Yugoslav years ===
As part of Ansambl Teodosievski, she and Teodosievski began a career in the 1960s. In Socialist Federal Republic of Yugoslavia, Romani people were officially recognised as a national minority and were granted linguistic and cultural rights. Despite the official policy of multi-culturalism, Yugoslav music producers discriminated against Romani people. She and Teodosievski were affected by the racism of Macedonian institutions and the gossip of the public. At Radio Skopje, Teodosievski was derided by his colleagues for supporting Romani music. Per him, he was expelled from the League of Communists of Macedonia for supporting her. In the beginning of her career, they deliberately denied her opportunities. As a result, she and Teodosievski decided to move to Belgrade in the 1960s, the capital of Yugoslavia, to gain more opportunities. In 1962, she was the first Yugoslav artist to perform at the Olympia in Paris. In her early career, Teodosievski expanded her repertoire, arranged her tours and planned her career by allowing appearances for concerts and for radio and television recordings. Her early repertoire consisted of Macedonian folk songs.

Her signature song of the mid-1960s is "Čhaje Šukarije" (Beautiful Girl). She claimed that she wrote the melody and lyrics of the song, but Medo Čun also claimed to have contributed to the melody. Redžepova married Teodosievski in 1968, but they had to marry during the mourning period because of her father's death. At that time, it was unthinkable for Macedonians and Romani people to engage in mixed marriages, and both ethnic groups did not want to do it. She was well-received by her Macedonian fans. According to her cousin Šani Rifati, Romani people initially rejected her because she married a non-Romani man. For Romani people, Teodosievski's ethnic Macedonian ancestry was problematic. After achieving international stardom, she was eventually accepted by her compatriots. Yugoslav media characterised her with traits considered typical to Romani people: she was portrayed as hot blooded, happy and easy going, and genetically talented. Comments were often made about her dark skin. She and Teodosievski maintained these stereotypes as long as they were positive, constructing an image that depicted the Romani woman as beautiful, sensual, fiery, and respectable.

She was the first Balkan Romani musician to gain commercial success in the non-Romani world, the first Romani singer to perform in the Romani and Macedonian languages for non-Romani people, the first female Romani artist to record in Yugoslavia, the first Macedonian woman to perform on television, and the first Romani performer to appear in Romani-style dimije for non-Romani audiences. They recorded many albums and EPs, and took part in radio and television shows. At the end of the 1960s, Redžepova and Teodosievski founded a music school where they fostered and trained young disadvantaged boys, mostly Romani ones. Most of the musicians in Ansambl Teodosievski were trained in the school and some of them eventually achieved fame. In total, 47 boys attended that school. 5 of them were raised under their roof. All of the children received education, lodging, meals, and clothing for free, while Redžepova had the role an adoptive mother and vocal coach.

By encouraging other Macedonian Romani musicians, Redžepova and Teodosievski built a circle around them. Among the most prominent members were the singers Muharem Serbezovski, Usnija Redžepova and Enver Rasimov, and clarinetist Medo Čun. Yugoslavia was part of the Non-Aligned Movement and the Yugoslav artistic scene was subject to many international influences. Redžepova also performed several songs in other languages, such as Greek, Turkish, Hebrew and Hindi. Redžepova and Teodosievski visited India three times, in 1969, 1976 and 1983. During their second trip, they were entitled the King and the Queen of Romani Music at the first Romani Music Festival in Chandigarh. In 1983, Redžepova sang in front of Indira Gandhi. She gifted Gandhi šalvari and taught her how to tie a Romani headscarf. In addition to performing for Gandhi, Redžepova also sang for Josip Broz Tito, Reza Pahlavi and Muammar Gaddafi. Together with her ensemble, she performed for public audiences in several countries, including the United States, the Soviet Union, Mexico, Australia and Canada.

=== Career after the independence of Macedonia ===
In Socialist Republic of Macedonia, because to the exclusion of the Romani people, her songs were not not on radio and television there for 25 years. In 1989, she settled in Skopje with her husband. After independence in 1991, the Republic of Macedonia went through difficult times. She released a selection of duets with Usnija Redžepova in 1994. Teodosievski died in 1997 at the age of 72. She toured the United States the year after, performing at a series of benefit concerts. In 1997 and 1998, she lectured Americans at the East European Folklife Center’s Balkan Music and Dance Workshops. At the 1998 Romska Vasilica singing contest in Macedonia, out of 9 singers, she was the only woman. In the 1990s, she started training female singers, including her protégée Eleonora Mustafovska.

The 2000s were very fruitful and marked a slight shift in the singer's career. In Macedonia and former Yugoslavia, she gained a more modern image and redefined herself as a worldbeat artist. For instance, she made several collaborations with other artists. In 2000, she collaborated with American klezmer trumpeter Frank London on the album "Chaje Shukarije", which contains new versions of the songs, and in the same year, she also collaborated with Macedonian composer Duke Bojadžiev on the album "Esma's Dream: Esma and Duke". In 2001, she collaborated with Italian guitarist/mandolinist Aco Bocina. In 2007 she collaborated with the French musician Titi Robin on songs of her album "Mon Histoire" (Accord-Croises). In 2002, she recorded a song named "Dani Su Bez Broja" (Days are endless) with the Croatian band Magazin, where she sang an introductory verse in Romani. In the same year, Redžepova had a duet with the Macedonian singer Toše Proeski. Her song titled "Naktareja mo Ilo Phanlja" (He closed my heart with a key) was inserted into the song "Magija" (Magic). Her song is about a woman whose boyfriend deceived her and married her best friend instead. She also recorded a song with the Bosnian band Crno Vino in 2005. On the international scene, she contributed towards the establishment of Romani music as a non-mass-market good, pleasing an urban and cultural elite. Her ensemble was criticised by audiences for using the synthesizer, an instrument that is not used in traditional Romani music, and was booed at a concert in Spain. She defended the use of the instrument by saying that Romani music has used modern instruments for a while.

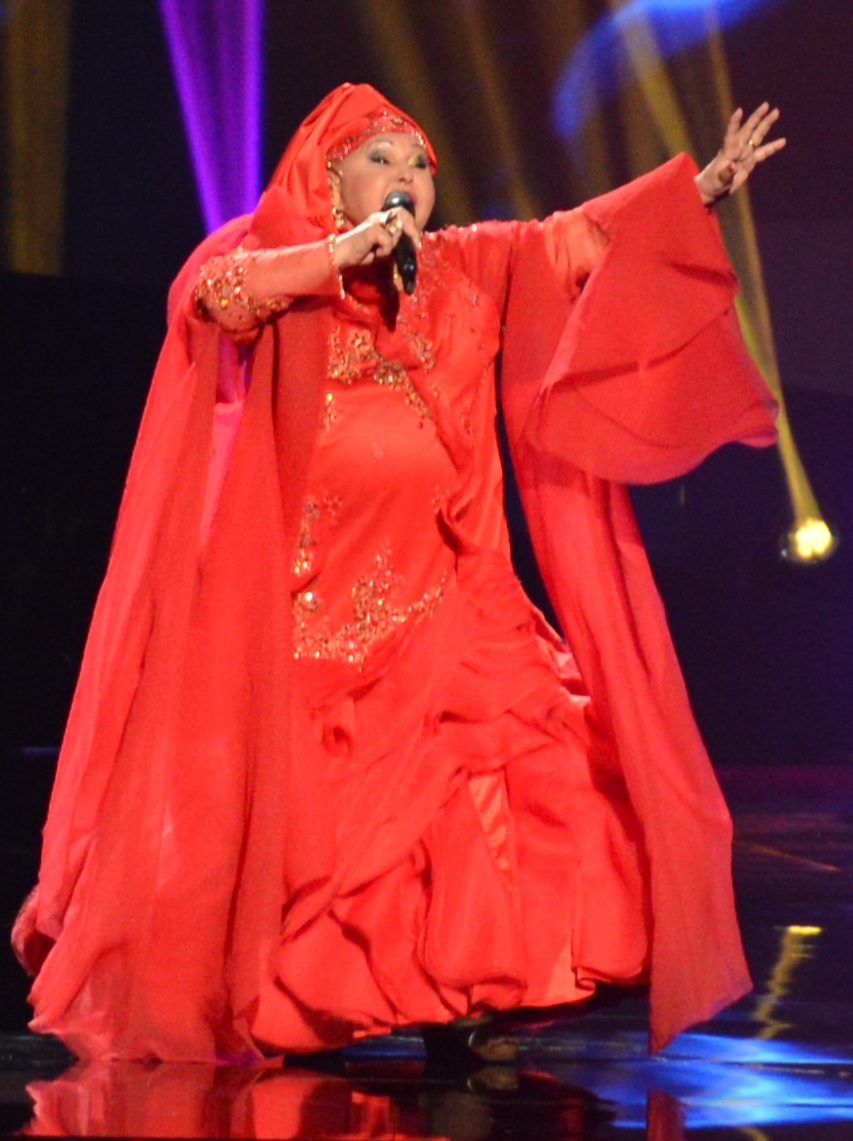
Redžepova during her Eurovision performance in 2013.

"Chaje Shukarije" is the feature song on the 2006 Borat movie soundtrack, which she claimed was used without her permission. She sued the producers of the film for €800,000 ($1,000,000). Afterwards, Redžepova won a €26,000 compensation, since it turned out that Sacha Baron Cohen received permission from her production house to take the song, which she was not notified about. However, the film credits her and the label, Times Square Records/World Connection. Her album started featuring an advertising sticker proclaiming "In Borat!"

She collaborated with the Macedonian pop singer Kaliopi on her 2004 hit "Bel Den" (Fair Day) and was a guest at Kaliopi's 13th anniversary megaconcert in 2006. She also collaborated with the ethnic Albanian pop singer Adrian Gaxha on the song "Ljubov e" (Love is). The song won second place by around 100 votes for the pre-selection contest for Eurovision. She considered retiring after Teodosievski's death but opted to continue her career. Redžepova initially turned down a record contract from the German label Asphalt Tango to have more control over her career but accepted it in 2008 and thus performed as a solo singer in their "Queens and Kings" tours. Her adoptive son Simeon Atanasov took over as her arranger. In 2009, she was in composer Kiril Džajkovski’s fusion song "Raise Up Your Hand" with the Jamaican artist Ras Tweed, with her singing in Romani.

She was selected together with Vlatko Lozanoski to represent Macedonia in the Eurovision Song Contest 2013. Their song, "Imperija" (Empire), was unveiled in March 2013, but it caused controversy in the country and abroad as its clip featured many monuments of the controversial project Skopje 2014, its lyrics and quality of the clip. The Macedonian Radio Television requested a new song. Eventually, "Pred da se razdeni" was released a month later. The song failed to advance from the second semi-final of the competition on 16 May 2013, placing 16th in the field of 17 songs, scoring 28 points.

=== Death ===
Redžepova died on 11 December 2016 in Skopje after an illness at the age of 73. She had previously been taken to hospital on 28 November, and was then in a critical condition. Her commemoration took place on 12 December at the Skopje City Council. She was buried on the same day at Butel cemetery, with her funeral being attended by her family, friends, colleagues and public figures.

== Film career ==
In addition to numerous video clips, Redžepova appeared in several films, both fictional and documentary. She made her debut as an actress in Krst Rakoc, a Yugoslav film released in 1962 and featuring Bata Živojinović in the main role. She recorded four songs included in the soundtrack. In 1968, she appeared as a singer in Zapej Makedonijo, a film for which she also recorded songs.

She appeared in four documentary films during the 2000s, starting with the German Im Herzen des Lichts – Die Nacht der Primadonnen in 2002. It was followed by When the Road Bends... Tales of a Gypsy Caravan in 2006, a documentary about five Romani music acts on their tour through the United States, which also depicted the poverty of the native villages in Romania of the Romani bands Taraf de Haidouks and Fanfare Ciocarlia. Due to her pride in her middle-class position, she was critical of the film as she thought the audiences would imagine that all Romani people live in squalid conditions. The film Rromani Soul, released the year after and directed by Louis Mouchet, features her as the guide of the true origin of Romani people located in Kannauj, Uttar Pradesh, by Romani linguist Marcel Courthiade. In 2009, she appeared in a second German documentary film, Balkan Soul & Gypsy Blues.

== Artistry ==
=== Repertoire ===
Redžepova recorded and released more than 580 songs, including two platinum and eight gold discs. She performed more than 22,000 concerts, a third of which were held for charities. With Ansambl Teodosievski, she recorded 108 singles, 32 compact cassettes, 15 discs, six videotapes and numerous television shows.

Redžepova embraced her Romani ethnicity, but also Yugoslav multi-culturalism through repertoire and costues. Dressed in six folk costumes, she performed songs from all six Yugoslav states and music of all ethnic groups. Thus, she complied with the Yugoslav principle of brotherhood and unity. Redžepova mostly sang in Romani and Macedonian, but she also recorded songs in Serbo-Croatian, Turkish, Hebrew, Greek and Hindi. Redžepova's songs often revolved around love, sorrow and marriage. She composed her songs and choreographed her performances.

=== Musical style and influences ===
Among her fans, she was known as Esma. Ansambl Teodosievski, which Redžepova performed the most with, is composed of traditional instruments, used both by Romani people and Macedonians, such as the oboe, accordion, zurna and davul. Most of Redžepova's songs were either in the line of Romani or Macedonian folk tradition, with various influences ranging from Turkish, Middle Eastern to Central European. However, contemporary influences are visible on her later work, which can be characterised as worldbeat influenced pop music.

Redžepova's voice greatly changed over the years. When she started singing, her voice was bright and almost childlike. Teodosievski compared it to the sound of a silver bell. Redžepova defended Romani music as inventive, evolving and subject to many influences. However, she was very critical of hybrid Romani music such as the ones from Spain and Hungary. She stated that Romani musicians from these countries sound like non-Romani musicians. Redžepova considered her singing style as old, traditional and classic.

In 2012, in an interview for Tocka, Redžepova credited her husband with making her the person she was then. She said that she was fascinated by the Bulgarian artist Nedyalka Keranova and the Iranian artist Googoosh, while also saying that she liked classical music, particularly from Luciano Pavarotti. Redžepova said that she had over 300 turbans.

=== Videos and stage ===
Redžepova and the Ensemble Teodosievski performing "Romano Horo" for the Austrian television in 1965

On stage and in her music videos, Redžepova played with stereotypes linked to Romani women and used traditional attire and dancers. The Middle Eastern character of her performances was often enhanced to please non-Romani audiences. In the same way, costumes worn by Redžepova or her dancers could be inaccurate to Macedonian Romani culture. For instance, some videos showed Hungarian or Russian costumes, to match the expectations of the non-Romani people about Romani culture and traditional dresses. Although Redžepova used sensuality and seduction in many of her early songs, such as her numerous čočeks, she limited this aspect of her performance by not wearing immodest belly dance outfits. Instead, she usually wore the Romani dimije, which she personalised by using modern fabrics. According to Silverman, she and Teodosievski were pioneers in the production of music videos, while making their mark on the Yugoslav music scene when television was developing there.

Her performances could be very theatrical depending on the song and the emotion that grew from it. For instance, when singing "Hajri Ma Te Dike", Redžepova usually wore a black veil and pretended to be weeping. Because she extensively worked with the same music ensemble, Redžepova had a particular relationship with her musicians. On stage, they stood and took part in the choreography and mime interactions with the singer in accordance with the text of the songs. In the early performances, musicians swayed left and right to the rhythm with their instruments, as did Western pop groups of that period.

== Museum of Music ==
When Redžepova settled back in Skopje with her husband in 1989, she started to work on a project: a Museum of Music and House of Humanity. The couple imagined it as a place to keep an archive of Romani music, and musical and historical artifacts, with a performance room, a studio and a place where impoverished people could get medical treatment.

The couple bought a plot close to the Contemporary Art Museum of Macedonia and the Skopje Fortress. Construction started in 1992. The building served as Redžepova's house and was to become a museum after her death. After her death, the place has been neglected.

== Humanitarian and political engagement ==
As a humanitarian, she organised more than 2,000 benefit concerts for orphanages, hospitals, disabled people, disaster victims, impoverished children and others. One benefit concert was made specifically for Romani people in 2002, which was organised by her cosuin Šani Rifati as leader of the NGO Voice of Roma and occurred in Kosovo among refugees. She was an honorary president of the Macedonian Red Cross, in recognition of her extensive work with Kosovar Romani refugees. Redžepova was also a member of the Lions Club.

Redžepova expressed patriotism for Yugoslavia and Macedonia. She perceived herself as an ambassador for Macedonia more than for Romani people, which was criticised by Romani activists. Redžepova was popular among many Macedonians. She was a cultural ambassador, and she was granted a diplomatic passport in 2007. She defended Macedonia as the least oppressive place for Romani people. She argued with Rifati about the defence of Macedonia. Rifati highlighted issues such as the health crisis, police brutality, high unemployment, and squalor in Romani refugee shantytowns. Rifati asked her to debut in her concert in Sebastopol, California, with a Romani song, because the city was the home of the sponsoring organisation, Voice of Roma. However, she refused and insisted on beginning with a Macedonian song and said that her artistic decisions were more important. In general, she advocated for larger cross-cultural understanding and pacifism. She also defended women's rights and their access to power, both on political and economic levels. In 1995, she sponsored a Romani women organisation from Skopje, which subsequently chose to be called "Esma". In 2010, she participated in a United Nations conference on women as part of the Macedonian delegation.

Redžepova became politically engaged in the 1990s, when she was close to the Romani leader Amdi Bajram and to Vasil Tupurkovski, founder of the Democratic Alternative. This centrist party was short-lived, and Redžepova became a member of the right-wing VMRO-DPMNE, which came into power in 2006. In 2009, Redžepova was elected as a member of the City Council of Skopje and was reelected in 2013. In 2010, she was granted €25,000 for her museum by the City Council of Skopje. The municipal opposition, led by the Social Democratic Union of Macedonia, was critical to the donation, which made the accusation that the building hosted a local VMRO-DPMNE office and was not used for the purposes of a museum. In 2013, she was granted a national pension, which was criticised by a councilor of the opposition, who saw it as an ethical dilemma as Redžepova was a member of the governmental coalition, while the Ministry of Culture defended it. The Macedonian entry for Eurovision, the song, "Imperija", was criticised by the public because it appeared to be a promotion of the Skopje 2014 urbanism project, led by the VMRO-DPMNE. The song was withdrawn.

== Awards and recognition ==
- 1976 – Queen of Romani Songs
- 2000 – Laureate and Roma Singer of the Century
- 2000 – Medal of Honor
- 2002 – Woman of the Year
- 2002 – Mother Teresa Award
- 2010 – Order of Merit for Macedonia
- 2013 – National Artist to the Republic of Macedonia

She was nicknamed "the Queen of the Gypsies". Redžepova was nominated for the Nobel Peace Prize in 2003 and 2005. Her name has been listed in NPR's 50 Great Voices. Redžepova is one of the principal subjects of the essay collection No Man's Lands: eight extraordinary women in Balkan history, by the British-Kosovan writers Elizabeth Gowing and Robert Wilton.

== See also ==
- Music of North Macedonia

Awards and achievements
Preceded by Kaliopi with "Crno i belo"	Macedonia in the Eurovision Song Contest with Vlatko Lozanoski; 2013	Succeeded by Tijana with "To the Sky"
