= Dolno Orizari =

Dolno Orizari may refer to:

- Dolno Orizari, Bitola, North Macedonia
- Dolno Orizari, Šuto Orizari, North Macedonia
