= Gorno Orizari =

Gorno Orizari may refer to:

- Gorno Orizari, Bitola, North Macedonia
- Gorno Orizari, Veles, North Macedonia
