= Dolno Orizari, Šuto Orizari =

Dolno Orizari Orizar i Poshtëm
- Долно Оризари
- Location within North Macedonia
- Coordinates: 42°02′24″N 21°25′30″E
- Country: Republic of North Macedonia
- Municipality: Šuto Orizari municipality

Population (2002)
  - Total: 1,550
- Time zone: UTC+1 (CET)
  - Summer (DST): UTC+2 (CEST)
- Car plates: SK
- Website: .

Dolno Orizari (Macedonian: Долно Оризари, Albanian: Orizar i Poshtëm) is a village in the municipality of Šuto Orizari, North Macedonia.

== Demographics ==
According to the 2002 census, the village had a total of 1550 inhabitants. Ethnic groups in the village include:

- Albanians 1389
- Romani 110
- Macedonians 37
- Turks 6
- Serbs 1
- Others 77
