= Muharem Serbezovski =

Roma singer and writer (born 1950)

Muharem Serbezovski Мухарем Сербезовски
- Also known as: Mumo
- Born: 2 May 1950 (age 76); Skopje, PR Macedonia, Yugoslavia
- Genres: Romani music, Pop-folk, Disco
- Occupations: Singer-songwriter and writer
- Instruments: vocals, guitar
- Years active: 1962–present
- Labels: PGP-RTB; Jugoton

Muharem "Mumo" Serbezovski (Macedonian: Мухарем Сербезовски; born 2 May 1950) is a Roma singer, popular in former Yugoslavia. He is also a writer and translator and was briefly in Bosnian politics in the 2000s. Although born in Yugoslav Macedonia, he has been living in Sarajevo, Bosnia and Hercegovina since 1975.

Muharem Serbezovski emerged as a singer in the 1960s, having released his first album at only 12. He became one of the most popular Romani singers in Yugoslavia and reached a wide popularity in the 1970s and 1980s. He has released 12 albums and 22 singles and extended plays. His main inspiration is Romani music but he has widely explored and blended other styles, especially Turkish music.

Since the 1980s, Serbezovski has established himself as a writer and translator, having written several books and translated the Quran into Romani language. Known for his Romani activism, he served a term as a member of the Bosnian parliament in the 2000s.

== Early life and background ==
Muharem Serbezovski was born on May 2, 1950, in Topaana, the oldest Romani settlement of Skopje, capital of the People's Republic of Macedonia, Yugoslavia. His family belonged to the local Romani minority and included 11 members. His father was an imam and gave him a great interest for Islam and its culture. Because his parents were poor, he had to start singing at a young age to earn money.

== Singing career ==
Muharem Serbezovski released his first single at 12 in 1962, Kalajđiljar Kalaj Japar. It contained songs in Turkish. He rose to fame in the late 1960s, thanks to the help of Stevo Teodosievski, a folk composer and director of a Romani ensemble, and his wife Esma Redžepova, herself a Roma singer. He was not their only protégé as they also encouraged other local Roma artists. Serbezovski started to experience a wide success in 1968, at the age of 18, following the release of his second single. It included two songs, Džemile and Gili e halisake, the first being in Serbo-Croatian, the other in Romani. These two tracks feature another friend of the Teodosievski couple, the clarinettist Medo Čun. They also show the ornamented style of singing and the Turkish influence which have characterised the singer through his career.

In 1969, Serbezovski left Skopje, as did most of the local Romani artists. He first followed Stevo and Esma to Belgrade, at that time the capital city of Yugoslavia and its main cultural hub. However, he moved to the smaller city of Sarajevo in 1975 and has been living there ever since. The Bosnian capital was then experiencing a rich cultural life and the singer was attracted to its cosmopolitan and Eastern atmosphere. Such a decision may also have been made for the singer to differentiate himself from Esma Redžepova. Her style was inspired by mainstream pop music and the Indian Romani heritage, while Serbezovski wanted to develop a music closer to Turkish and Arabic cultures.

Nonetheless, Muharem Serbezovski always tried to reach a wide audience and also explored various kinds of music, including Indian music. At that time, Yugoslavia and India were both part of the Non-Aligned Movement and Josip Broz Tito exploited the Indian origin of the Romani people to get the two countries closer. Indian cinema in particular was very popular among Yugoslav Romas. Several of Serbezovski's songs show such an influence, primarily Ramu, Ramu and Ramajana, both released in 1974. The first one makes reference to a character of the eponymous Indian film, the latter refers to a Hindu epic poem, Ramayana. Muharem Serbezovski went to India in 1978 to attend the Roma festival in Chandigarh. On this occasion, he met the prime minister Indira Gandhi and posed with her son Rajiv Gandhi dressed in the same Indian costume to highlight the resemblance between Indian and Roma peoples.

Besides his artistic connection to Stevo Teodosievski and Esma Redžepova, Muharem Serbezovski has also worked with other Yugoslav pop-folk artists, including his own brother, Ajnur Serbezovski, with whom he released a single in 1976 and an album in 1982. He also worked with his favourite musician, the late Toma Zdravković, with whom he toured for 7–8 years, and with Sinan Sakić.

Although he has always been proud of his Romani origin, Muharem Serbezovski has released only few songs in Romani language. Most of his work is sung in Serbo-Croatian. During the Bosnian War, he fully identified as a Bosnian and sang many war songs.

== Literature ==
Muharem Serbezovski defines himself as one of the few Romani intellectuals. He is responsible for the first Romani translation of the Qur'an and is himself an author, having penned several novels and poems. He started his career as a writer and translator in the 1980s when he continued the work of his father, who had started to translate the Qur'an into Romani. Serbezovski also has plans to translate the Old and New Testament, Hadiths and some well-known literary works (War and Peace, Crime and Punishment and One Hundred Years of Solitude) into Romani.

Serbezovski's first novel, Šareni dijamanti ("coloured diamonds"), was published in 1983. It was followed by Cigani A kategorije ("First-class Gypsies") in 1985, Za dežjem pride sonce : dva romana ("With rain comes the sun: two novels") in 1986, and his volume of poetry, Nitko ne zna puteve vjetrova i Cigana ("No one knows the road of winds and Gyspies") in 1999. He also published an essay, Cigani i ljudska prava ("Gypsies and human rights") in 2000. His fictional works revolve on Romani identity and are for him a way to write about his own culture. For him, his work gives a much more authentic insight on Roma people than novels from non-Romani writers, who usually use Romani characters only to set up an atmosphere.

== Politics ==
Serbezovski briefly involved himself in Bosnian politics in the 2000s. His political career was closely linked to his Romani activism and his own assimilation to Bosnian culture. He joined Haris Silajdžić's Party for Bosnia and Herzegovina, a Bosniak party, and was elected a member of the Bosnian parliament in 2006 for a 4-year term. He never intended to become a professional politician but wanted to represent Roma people on the Bosnian political scene. His time as a member of parliament was tarnished by a declaration on battered women. In 2009, he said he considered that violence against women was normal and part of the Balkan tradition, and caused outrage among the public and the Bosnian NGO sector. He resigned from his political party in 2010 citing discrimination from the leaders of the group.

== Works ==
=== Discography ===
==== Albums ====
- Muharem Serbezovski, PGP-RTB, 1973.
- Hej, čergari, hej, drugari , PGP-RTB, 1976.
- Muharem i Ajnur Serbezovski, Jugoton, 1982 (with Ajnur Serbezovski).
- Disko Orijent, Jugoton, 1982.
- Dođi mi u godini jedan dan, Jugoton, 1983.
- Zašto su ti kose pobelele druže, PGP-RTB, 1984.
- Teška beše našata razdelba, PGP-RTB, 1985.
- Muharem Serbezovski, Jugoton, 1986 (with the Crni Dijamanti ensemble).
- Zaljubih se..., Diskoton, 1987 (with the Crni Dijamanti ensemble).
- Srećan 8. Mart, Diskoton, 1989 (with the Crni Dijamanti ensemble).
- Bože, Bože, kakva je to žena, Diskoton, 1989.
- Lejla, Diskoton, 1991 (with the Crni Dijamanti ensemble).

==== Extended plays ====
- Kalajđiljar Kalaj Japar, Jugoton, 1962.
- Džemile, PGP-RTB, 1968.
- Šta će mi bogatstvo, PGP-RTB, 1969.
- Još uvek te volim, PGP-RTB, 1970.
- Alisa ne idi, PGP-RTB, 1971.
- Šeherezada, PGP-RTB, 1971.
- Spavaj, čedo, spavaj, PGP-RTB, 1972.
- Osman Aga, PGP-RTB, 1973.
- Srce cigansko, PGP-RTB, 1973.
- Ramajana, PGP-RTB, 1974 (with Medo Čun's ensemble).
- Ramu, Ramu, PGP-RTB, 1974.

==== Singles ====
- Ciganin sam i umem da volim, PGP-RTB, 1970.
- Ciganko vatrenog oka, PGP-RTB, 1971.
- Čekaću te ja, PGP-RTB, 1973.
- Zeleno, zeleno, PGP-RTB, 1975.
- Hajde svi da pevamo, PGP-RTB, 1975.
- Da li hoćeš, brate, Aliju, PGP-RTB, 1976 (with Ajnur Serbezovski).
- Ramajana, PGP-RTB, 1977.
- Zašto su ti kose pobelele druže, PGP-RTB, 1977 (with the Crni Dijamanti ensemble).
- U haremu, Jugoton, 1979.
- Suzana, volim te, Jugoton, 1979.
- Pesma prijatelju, Jugoton, 1980.

==== Compilations ====
- Muharem Serbezovski, PGP-RTB, 1975.
- Braća Serbezovski, PGP-RTB, 1983 (with Ajnur Serbezovski).
- Legende narodne muzike, Extra Music, 2008 (with Novica and Toma Zdravković).
- 39 velikih hitova, Extra Music, 2012.

=== Bibliography ===
- With Dino Malović (1983). Šareni dijamanti. Sarajevo: Veselin Masleša.
- Cigani "A" kategorije. Sarajevo: Veselin Masleša. 1985.
- Za dežjem pride sonce : dva romana. Murska Sobota: Pomurska založba. 1986.
- Cigani i ljudska prava. Sarajevo: Vijeće kongresa bošnjačkih intelektualaca. 2000.
- With Jusuf Ramić and Mehmedalija Hadžić (2005). Kurʼani. Sarajevo: Romano lil.
