= Emil Abaz =

Macedonian footballer (born 1998)

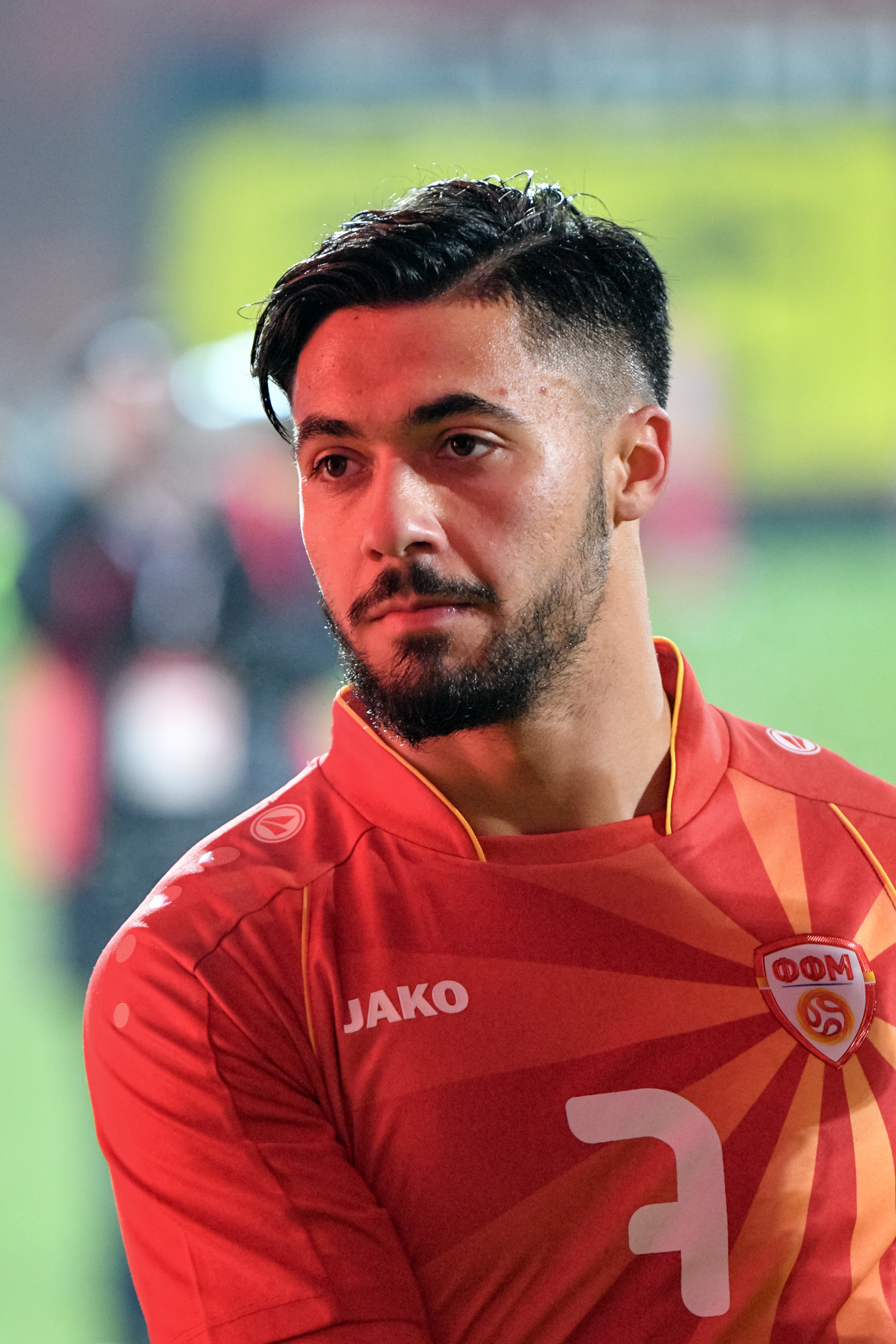
- Abaz with North Macedonia U21 in 2019

Personal information
- Date of birth: 17 January 1998 (age 28)
- Place of birth: Skopje, Macedonia
- Height: 1.75 m (5 ft 9 in)
- Position: Forward

Team information
- Current team: KSC City Pirates
- Number: 7

Youth career
- –2013: Beerschot
- 2013–2016: Anderlecht
- 2016: Dinamo Zagreb
- 2017: Spartak Subotica

Senior career*
Years	Team	Apps	(Gls)
2016	Dinamo Zagreb II	7	(0)
2017	Spartak Subotica	22	(0)
2018–2019	Beerschot Wilrijk	11	(0)
2019–2020	Borec	21	(0)
2020–2023	Rupel Boom	17	(5)
2023–2024	Cappellen	18	(1)
2024–	KSC City Pirates	9	(4)

International career
- Belgium U16
2014	Macedonia U17	3	(0)
2015–2016	Macedonia U19	6	(0)
2017–2019	North Macedonia U21	15	(2)
- * Club domestic league appearances and goals as of 16 January 2026

Emil Abaz (Macedonian: Емил Абаз; born 17 January 1998) is a Macedonian professional footballer who plays as a forward for KSC City Pirates.

== Club career ==
Born in Skopje, Abaz played with Beerschot A.C. before joining the youth team of Belgian club Anderlecht in 2013. He played for Anderlecht in the semi-finals of the 2015–16 UEFA Youth League against Chelsea.

In summer 2016 he signed with Croatian club Dinamo Zagreb. Abaz played for Dinamo in the 2016–17 UEFA Youth League and with Dinamo Zagreb II in the 2016–17 Croatian Second League.

In January 2017, during the winter-break, he left Dinamo Zagreb and signed with Serbian club Spartak Subotica. He made his debut in the 2016–17 Serbian SuperLiga in the 26th round played on 12 March 2017, in an away game against FK Rad, a 3–0 defeat. At the beginning of 2018, Abaz mutually terminated the contract with Spartak, and left the club as a free agent.

== International career ==
As a Romani born in Skopje, he represented initially Belgium where he was living, playing for Belgium U-16. Then he switched and started playing for Macedonia. He made appearances for Macedonia U-17 and U-19 national teams.

On 24 March 2017, he made his debut for the Macedonia U-21 national team, entering the game in the 69th minute as a substitute for the captain Petar Petkovski, in a friendly match against Montenegro U-21 that Macedonia won with 2–0.

== Personal life ==
Abaz also holds Belgian citizenship.
