= Stevo Teodosievski =

Stevo Тeodosievski Стево Теодосиевски
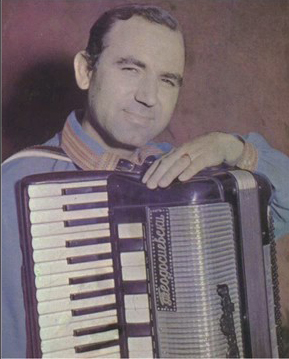

Background information
- Born: 16 April 1924; Kočani, Kingdom of Serbs, Croats and Slovenes
- Died: 9 April 1997 (aged 72); Skopje, Macedonia
- Occupation(s): songwriter, humanitarian
- Instrument: accordion
- Years active: 1950–1997
- Labels: Monitor Records
- Formerly of: Ansambl Teodosievski
- Spouse: Esma Redžepova (m. 1968)

Stevo Teodosievski (Macedonian: Стево Теодосиевски, pronounced [ˈstɛvɔ tɛɔdɔˈsiɛfski]; 16 April 1924 – 9 April 1997) was a Macedonian artist, music educator and humanist. After a childhood in his hometown, he spent his youth in Belgrade, returning to Kočani after World War II. Stevo Teodosievski died in Skopje on 9 April 1997.

In the 1950s he was a truck driver while pursuing professional photography in Skopje, where he began to make money as a musician. Playing accordion at restaurants and private parties, Teodosievski engaged in private music lessons for solfeggio and music theory. Teodosievski later worked at co-repetition program of Radio Skopje. In 1954 he met Esma Redžepova who would later become his life companion. In the period from 1960 to 1989, Teodosievski and Redžepova lived and worked in Belgrade, and then they returned to Skopje. 47 children were brought up and educated in the traditional spirit in his music school.

Ansambl Teodosievski has held more than 20,000 concerts, of which around 2,000 humanitarian, has issued 108 single plates, 20 Long - play records, 32 audio cassettes, 15 CDs, 6 video cassettes and recorded 12 shows by 30 minutes at MRTV.

Winner of many awards and honors:

- October award of Yugoslavia
- Silver and gold medal from the President of Yugoslavia, Josip Broz Tito
- Silver medal from the Red Cross of Montenegro
- Gold medal for humanist in Bosnia and Herzegovina
- Gold medal the Red Cross of Yugoslavia
- Award of UNICEF Yugoslavia
- Award for lifetime achievement in Serbia and Montenegro
- Gold medal, "December 22nd - Yugoslavia"
- in 1992. Award of the city of Skopje "November 13th" in the field of culture and art.
