= Gorno Orizari, Veles =

Gorno Orizari Горно Оризари
- Village
- Location within North Macedonia
- Coordinates: 41°41′10″N 21°44′00″E
- Country: North Macedonia
- Region: Vardar
- Municipality: Veles

Population (2002)
  - Total: 2,262
- Time zone: UTC+1 (CET)
  - Summer (DST): UTC+2 (CEST)
- Car plates: VE
- Website: .

Gorno Orizari (Macedonian: Горно Оризари) is a village in the municipality of Veles, North Macedonia.

== Demographics ==
Emigration from the village by inhabitants and its subsequent depopulation has been alleviated with the population being replaced by people from Sandžak. These Sandžakli's settled in Gorno Orizari after the Turkish population migrated from the village. In the 1960s there were 30 Muslim Albanian households in the village.

According to the 2002 census, the village had a total of 2262 inhabitants. Ethnic groups in the village include:

- Bosniaks 2032
- Macedonians 113
- Albanians 66
- Serbs 22
- Turks 15
- Romani 1
- Others 13
