= Orizari, Gjorče Petrov =

Orizari Оризари
- Village
- Location within Republic of Macedonia
- Coordinates: 42°00′N 21°20′E
- Country: North Macedonia
- Region: Skopje

Population (2002)
  - Total: 15,637
- Time zone: UTC+1 (CET)
  - Summer (DST): UTC+2 (CEST)
- Car plates: SK

Orizari (Macedonian: Оризари) is a town in the municipality of Gjorče Petrov, North Macedonia.

== Demographics ==
According to the 2002 census, the town had a total of 15637 inhabitants. Ethnic groups in the town include:

- Macedonians 13394
- Serbs 534
- Bosniaks 429
- Albanians 346
- Turks 303
- Romani 279
- Vlachs 48
- Others 304
