= 50 Great Voices =

NPR yearlong series from 2010 to 2011

50 Great Voices was an NPR yearlong series from 2010 to 2011 to profile 50 singers who have made their mark internationally and across recorded history, revealing the selected voices one by one, weekly.

== Selection process ==
The stated aim of the series was to highlight "50 singers who've made their mark internationally and across recorded history." Focusing on music discovery, the NPR editors who compiled the list started with on-air and online solicitation of nominations, and later votes, as a first step. They then put together a panel of music journalists, critics, and musicologists to discuss nominations and come to a rough consensus on fifty artists to highlight.

The panel prioritized music discovery over naming the "fifty best" or "fifty most influential" singers. One method was to name singers who were well-respected within their own genre, but lacked widespread familiarity. Another was to explicitly prioritize singers from outside the United States. The panel aimed to identify great, but not universally recognizable, singers.

The panel also did not shy away from controversy. Elizabeth Blair of NPR said of the process, "Whenever you come up with any kind of list, whether it's great athletes or great artists, there's bound to be controversy. [...] The 50 Great Voices series will both please and infuriate. And that's partly the point."
