= Šuto Orizari =

Romani neighbourhood in Skopje, North Macedonia

Coordinates: 42°02′11.82″N 21°25′33.16″E

Šuto Orizari Шуто Оризари Šutka
- City Municipality
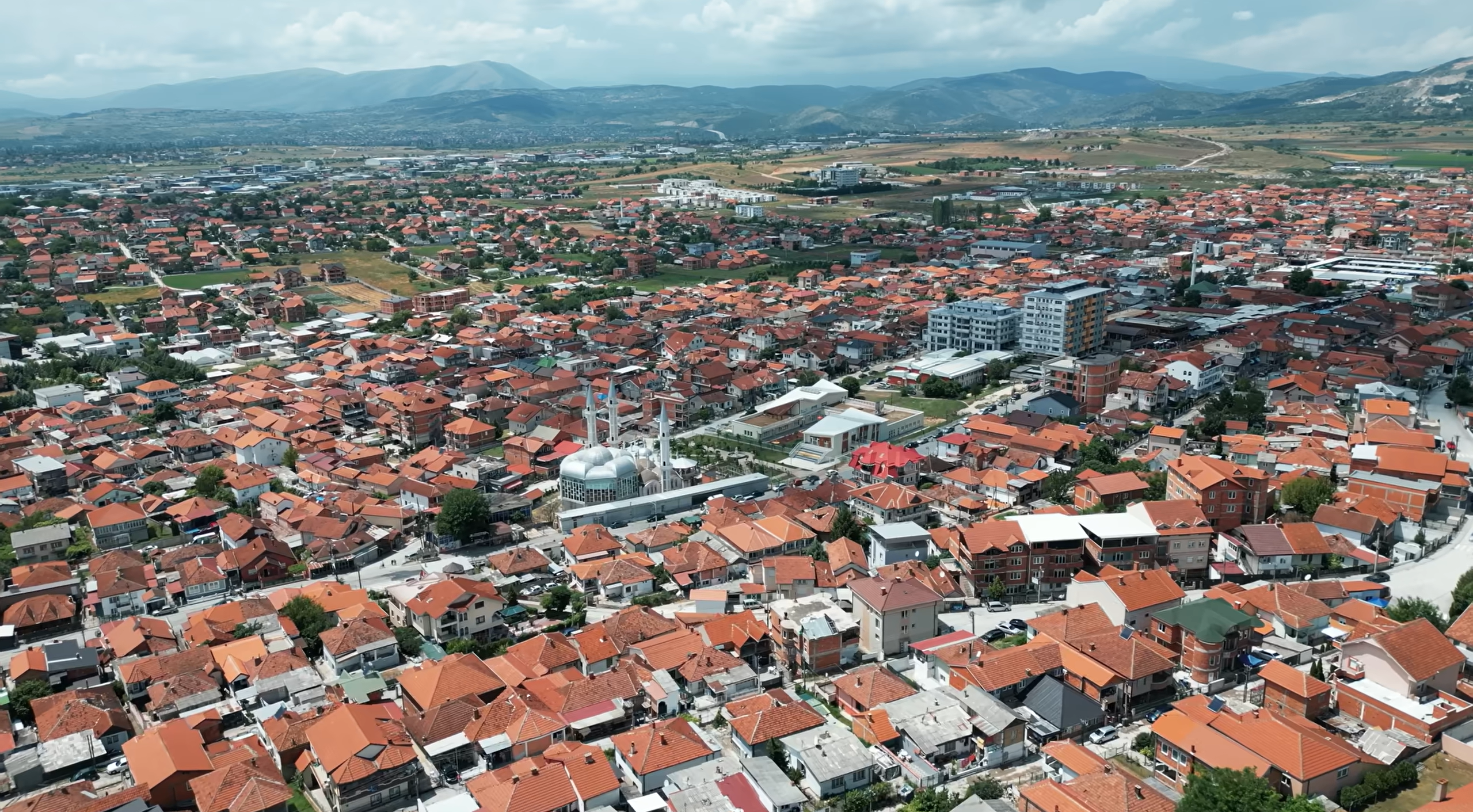
- Šuto Orizari, Skopje, North Macedonia
- Nickname: Šutka

- Location within North Macedonia
- Country: North Macedonia
- Municipality: Šuto Orizari municipality

Area
  - Total: 7.48 km^{2} (2.89 sq mi)

Population (2002)
  - Total: 15,353
- Time zone: UTC+1 (CET)
  - Summer (DST): UTC+2 (CEST)
- Postal code: 1200
- Area code: +389 044
- Car plates: SK
- Website: http://www.SutoOrizari.gov.mk

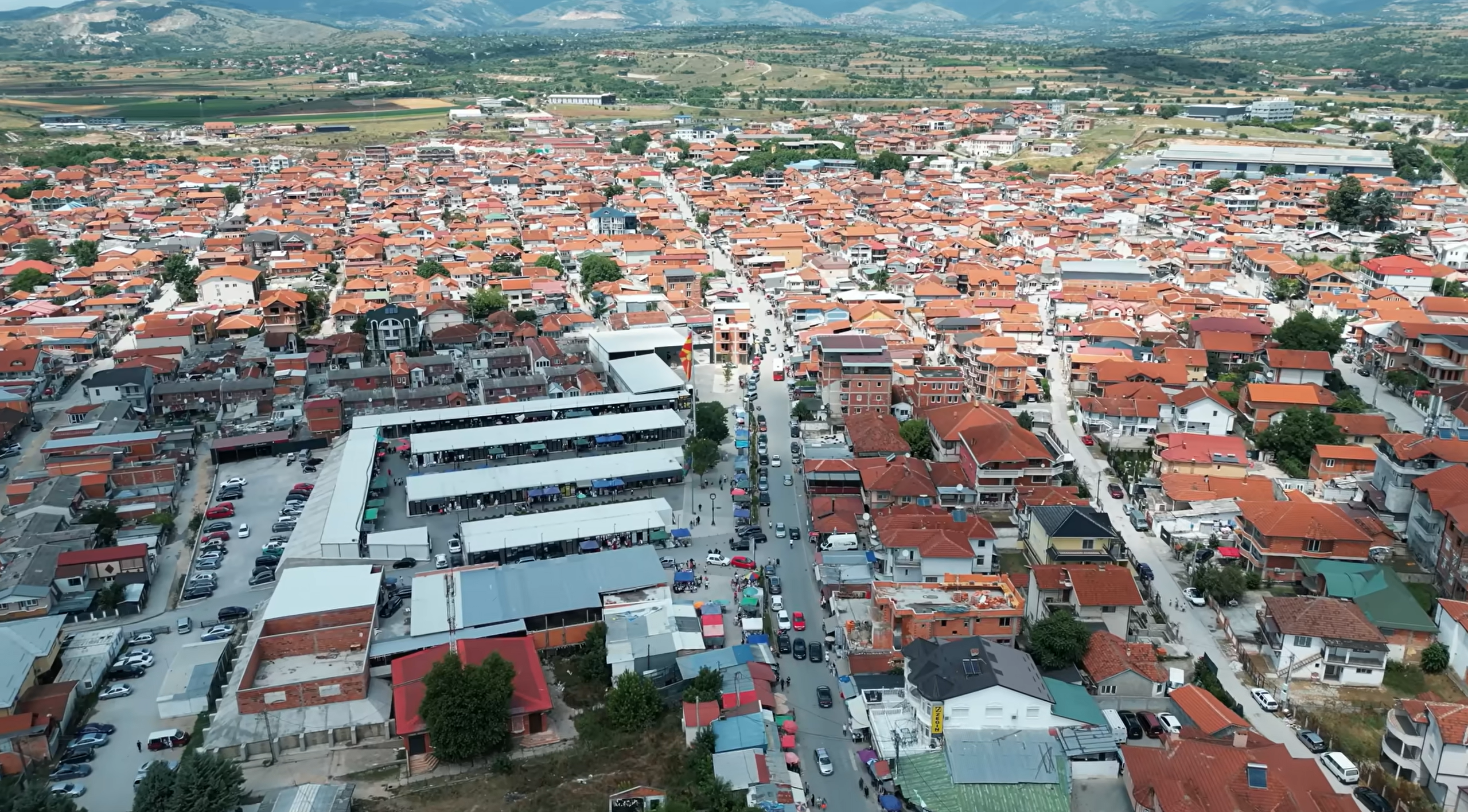
Šutka from above.

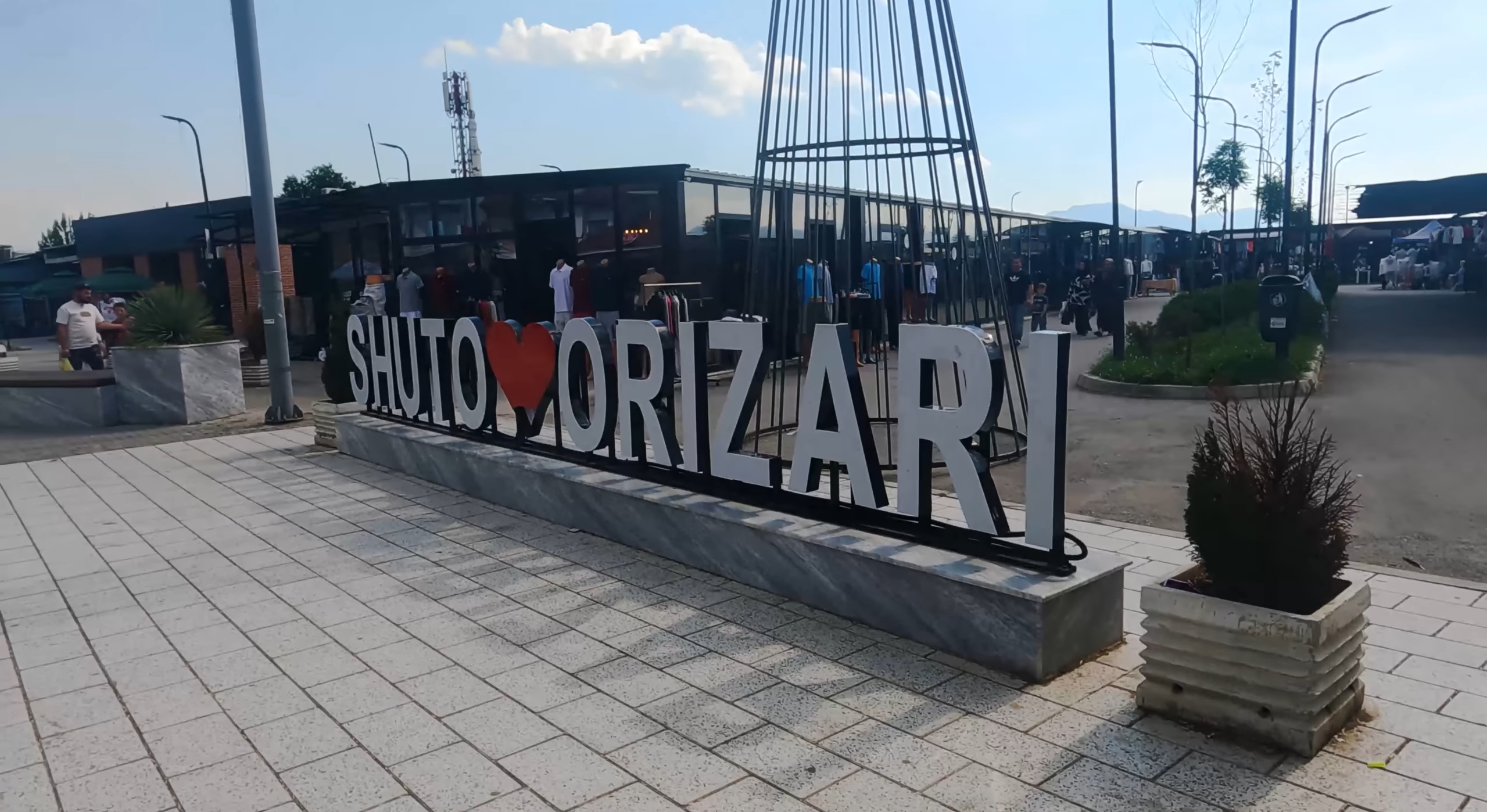
Šuto Orizari sign in market

Šuto Orizari (Macedonian: Шуто Оризари,, Balkan Romani: Shuto Orizari, Albanian: Shutkë), often shortened as Šutka (Macedonian: Шутка, Albanian: Shutkë), is a neighbourhood in the City of Skopje, North Macedonia, and the seat of Šuto Orizari Municipality. It is often regarded as the cultural capital of the Romani people in North Macedonia. It is "the only place in the world where Roma are organised politically and economically" according to president of Šutka's municipal council, Sead Ismail. An independent Romanistan (a state for the Romani people) was proposed here in the early 1990s by leaders of the Party for the Complete Emancipation of Roma.

== Geography ==
Šuto Orizari is located to the North of central Skopje, at approximately 5 km of Macedonia Square. The municipality is at the northern edge of the urban unit and comprises some agricultural land. To the south, Šuto Orizari is bordered by Butel, another municipality of Skopje. To the north, it is bordered by Čučer-Sandevo, a rural municipality.

The municipality comprises three distinct settlements: Šuto Orizari proper, Dolno Orizari and Gorno Orizari. The first is an urban neighbourhood forming part of the urban unit and located inside the Skopje bypass. The second is a small village which comprised only 454 inhabitants in 2002. It is located north of the bypass. Gorno Orizari is located between Šuto Orizari proper and the rest of the city. The municipality is separated from the rest of Skopje by the Serava, a small river tributary to the Vardar, by Slovenia boulevard and by the Skopje-Pristina railway. The nearest train station is Skopje-Sever ("Skopje-North"), located in Butel. To the west Šuto Orizari is bordered by the village of Vizbegovo, and to the east by the Butel cemetery, the largest in Skopje.

== Demographics ==
According to the 2002 census, the town had a total of 15353 inhabitants. Ethnic groups in the town include:

- Romani people: 13201
- Albanians: 1205
- Macedonians: 481
- Bosniaks: 138
- Turks: 49
- Serbs: 34
- Other: 253

Šuto Orizari is part of the neighbourhoods northeast of the Vardar river, an area that is generally associated with Albanians in North Macedonia.
