= Šuto Orizari Municipality =

Municipality of North Macedonia

Šuto Orizari Шуто Оризари Shuto Orizari Shutkë
- City municipality
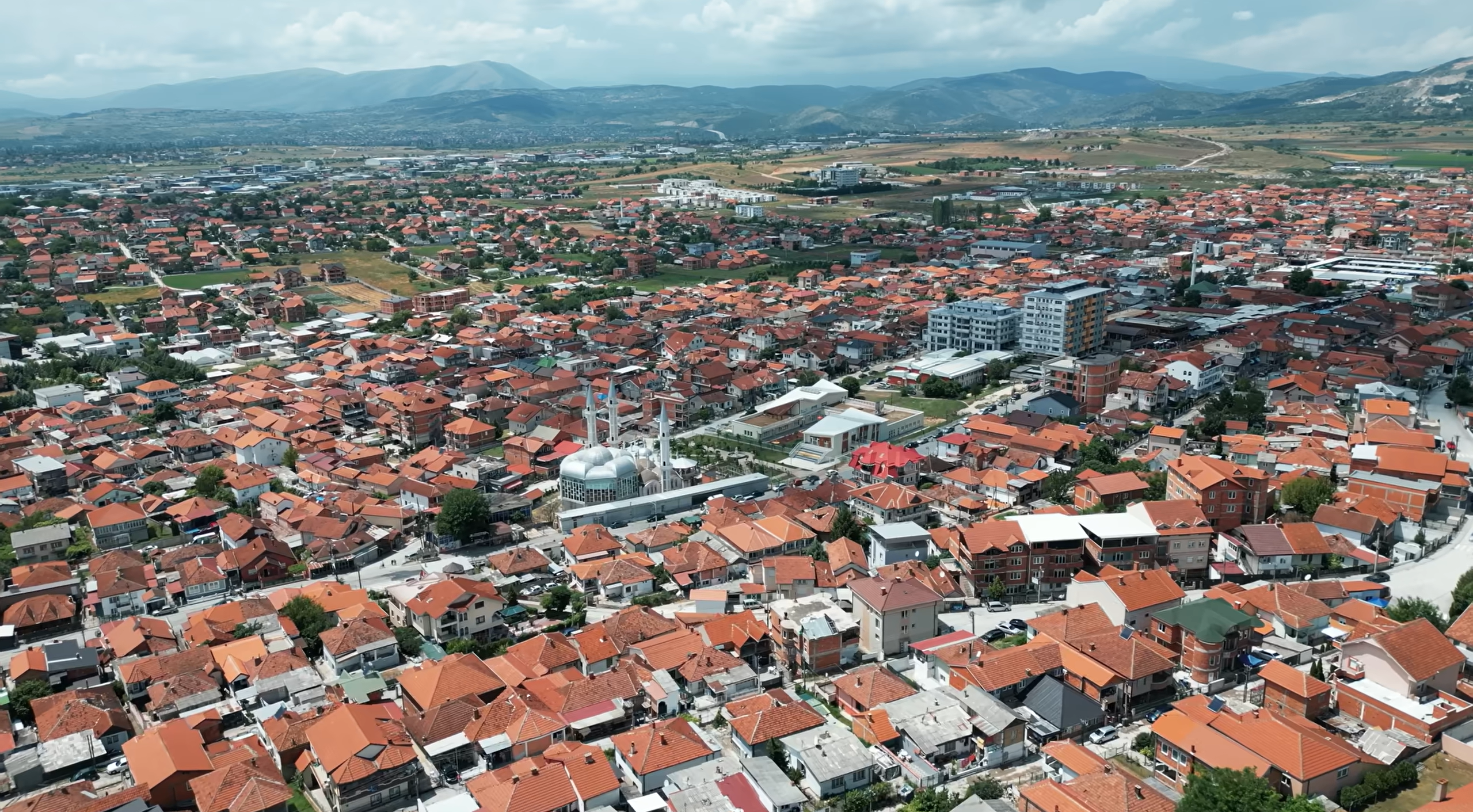
- Šuto Orizari, Skopje, North Macedonia

- Flag Coat of arms

- Coordinates: 42°02′31″N 21°25′19″E
- Country: North Macedonia
- Region: Skopje
- Municipal seat: Šuto Orizari

Government
  - Mayor: Kurto Duduš (Union of Roma in Macedonia)

Area
  - Total: 7.48 km^{2} (2.89 sq mi)

Population
  - Total: 25,726
  - Density: 3,439/km^{2} (8,910/sq mi)
- Time zone: UTC+1 (CET)
  - Summer (DST): UTC+2 (CEST)
- Postal code: 1200
- Area code: +389 044
- Car plates: SK
- Website: http://www.SutoOrizari.gov.mk

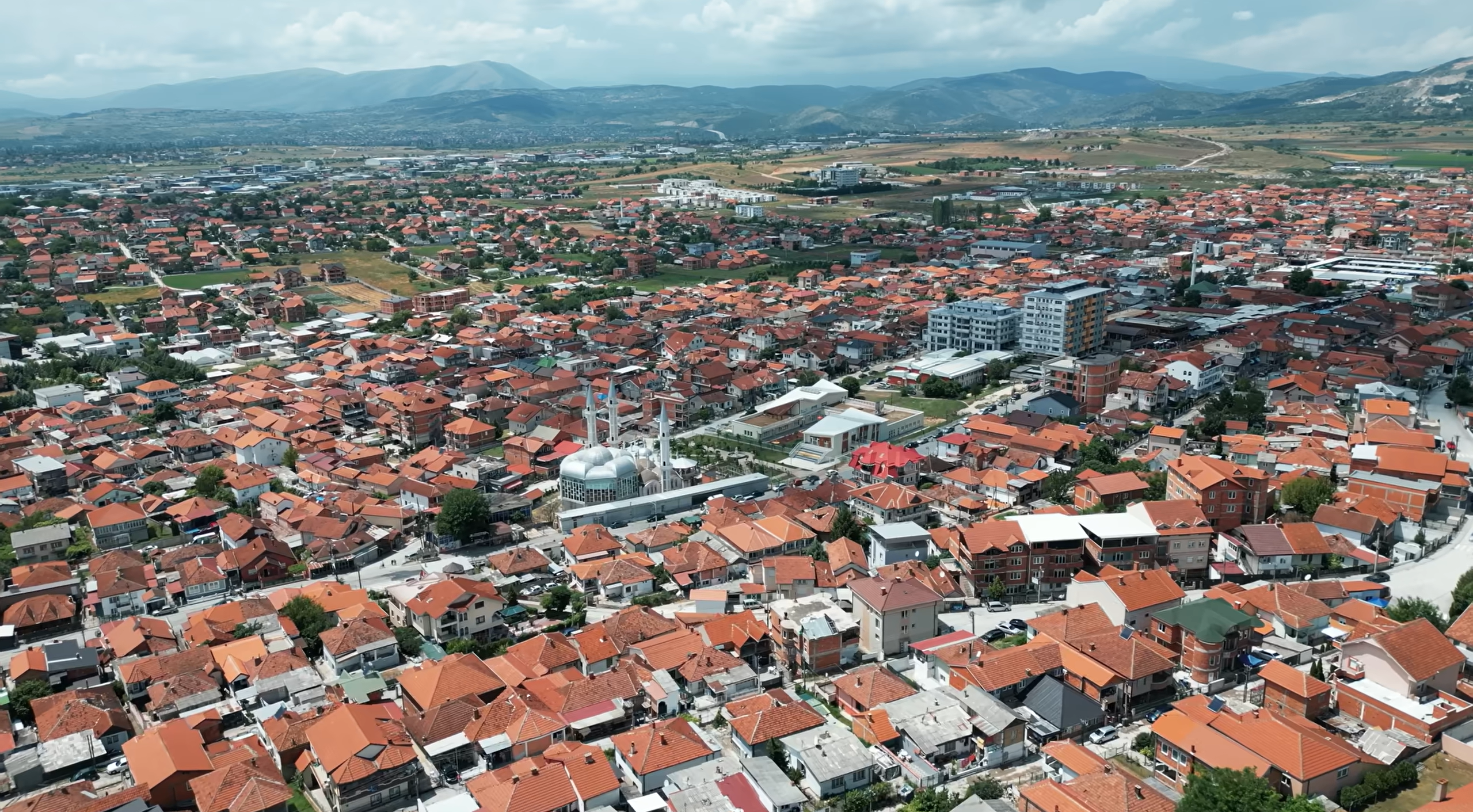
Amdi Pasha Mosque in Šuto Orizari

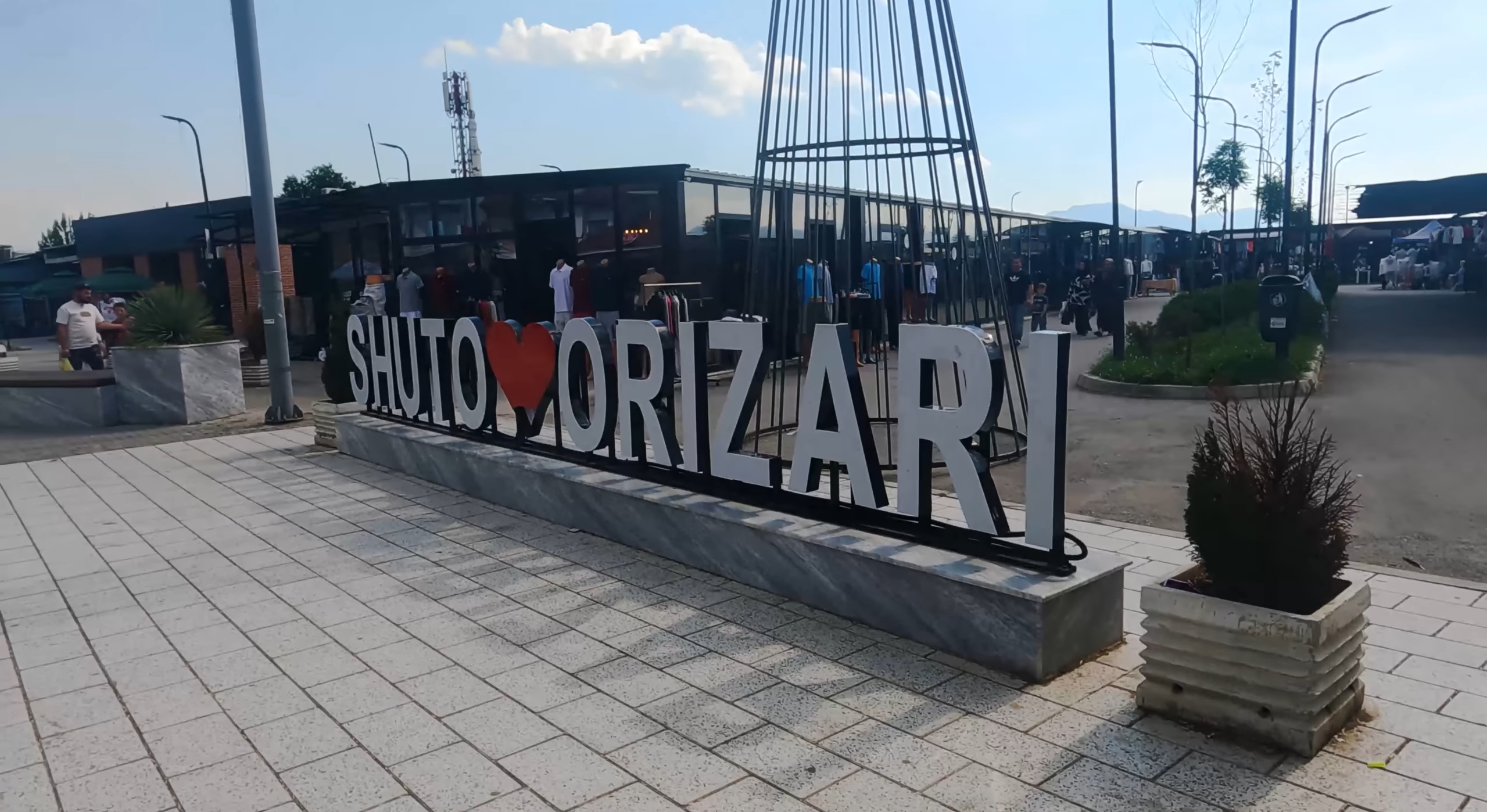
Suto Orizari sign in the market

Šuto Orizari (Macedonian: Шуто Оризари; Balkan Romani: Shuto Orizari; Albanian: Shutkë), often shortened as Šutka (Шутка), is one of the ten municipalities that make up the City of Skopje, the capital of the Republic of North Macedonia. Šuto Orizari is also the name of the urban neighbourhood where the municipal seat is located. It consists of a council and mayor.

Šuto Orizari covers 7.48 km² and had 17,357 inhabitants in 2002. It is the second smallest municipality of Skopje behind Čair and the least populated. Created ex-nihilo after the 1963 Skopje earthquake to relocate Romani people in North Macedonia who had lost their homes, Šuto Orizari was the only municipality in North Macedonia with a Muslim Romani people majority. In 2002, they represented 60.6% of the population, and in 2021 they represented 43.8% of the population. Šuto Orizari is the only local administrative unit in the world to have adopted Balkan Romani as an official language.

== History ==
For much of its history, Šuto Orizari was a small village in the country, as were neighbouring Butel and Vizbegovo. Its name derives from orizar (оризар), the Macedonian word for paddy field. It is only after the 1963 Skopje earthquake that the area became urbanised. Through the 20th century, Skopje had greatly expanded: while it had only 41,000 inhabitants in 1921, it had reached 166,870 in 1961. As a result, the area around Šuto Orizari was slowly becoming part of the city.

Before the earthquake, most of Skopje's Romani people in North Macedonia community lived in areas close to the Old Bazaar. The largest one is Topaana, located close to the fortress and home to Roma people since at least the 14th century. Built in cheap materials, Topaana and the other Roma settlements were severely damaged by the earthquake which destroyed around 80% of the whole city.

Thanks to international aid, the reconstruction started quickly after the earthquake. Local authorities took the opportunity to rebuild Skopje as a functional and modern city, privileging large blocks of flats and dividing Skopje into areas dedicated to specific uses. As they also had to build new accommodation for the large Roma minority, they first considered the reconstruction as a way to assimilate them and resolve unemployment and sanitary problems that concerned that population.

Most of the Muslim Roma population refused to live in the new buildings and authorities eventually decided to give them a specific neighbourhood where they could build the houses they wished. The first buildings to appear were iron shacks donated by the United States. They were planned for temporary use, but some still remain more than 40 years after the earthquake. Most of the Muslim Romani community of Šutka is still facing unemployment and hard living conditions, although some of them manage to build large houses with the money they get as seasonal workers in Western Europe. The Roma houses in Šutka are built with solid materials and have fenced gardens. The area does not give the same impression of marginality as do older Romani neighbourhoods such as Topaana.

Šuto Orizari became a distinct municipality in 1996.

== Geography ==
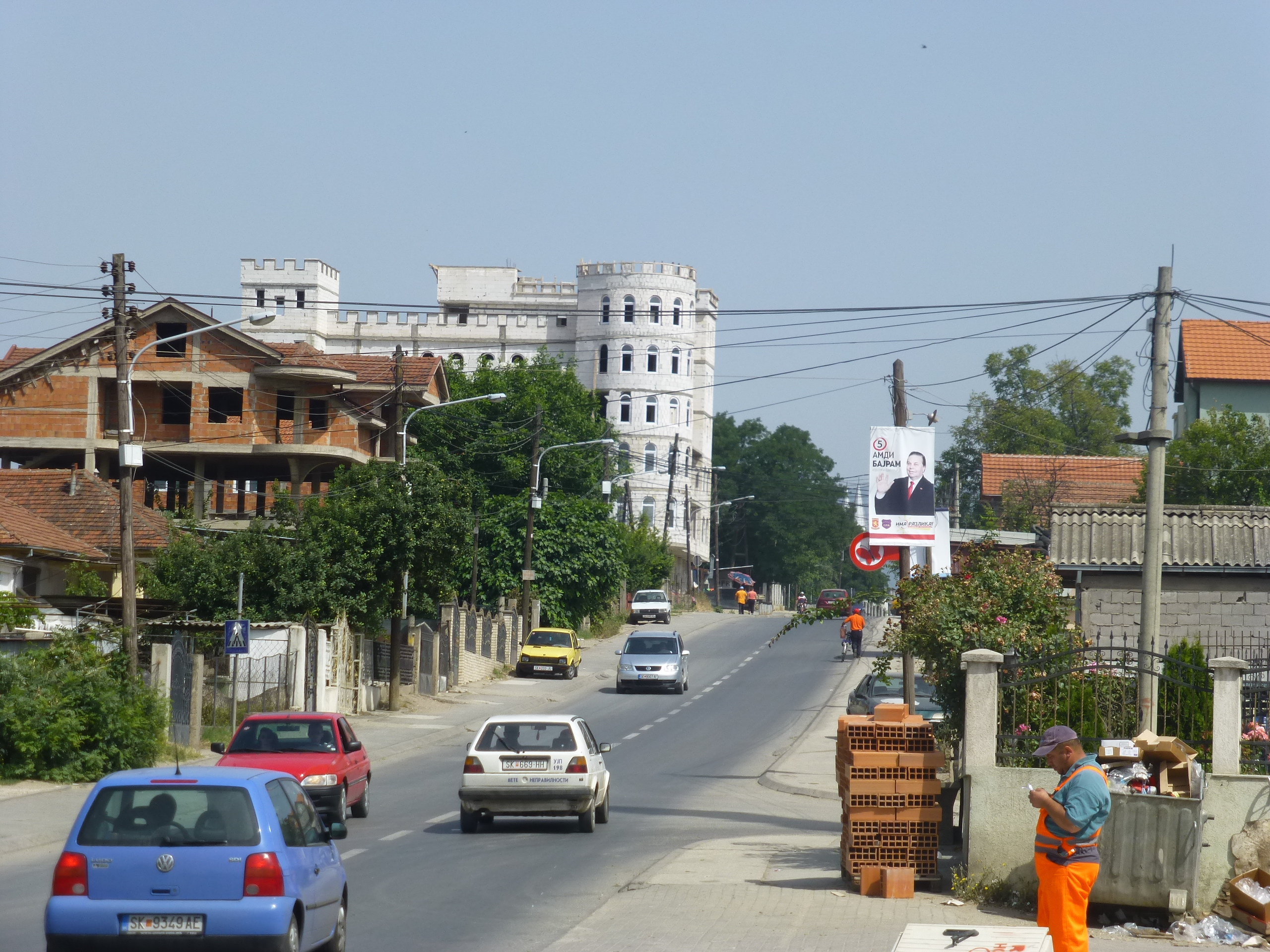
Šuto Orizari

Šuto Orizari is located to the North of central Skopje, at approximately 5 km of Macedonia Square. The municipality is at the northern edge of the urban unit and comprises some agricultural land. To the south, Šuto Orizari is bordered by Butel, another municipality of Skopje. To the north, it is bordered by Čučer-Sandevo, a rural municipality.

The municipality comprises three distinct settlements: Šuto Orizari proper, Dolno Orizari and Gorno Orizari. The first is an urban neighbourhood forming part of the urban unit and located inside the Skopje bypass. The second is a small village which comprised only 454 inhabitants in 2002. It is located north of the bypass. Gorno Orizari is located between Šuto Orizari proper and the rest of the city. The municipality is separated from the rest of Skopje by the Serava, a small river tributary to the Vardar, by Slovenia boulevard and by the Skopje-Pristina railway. The nearest train station is Skopje-Sever ("Skopje-North"), located in Butel. To the west Šuto Orizari is bordered by the village of Vizbegovo, and to the east by the Butel cemetery, the largest in Skopje.

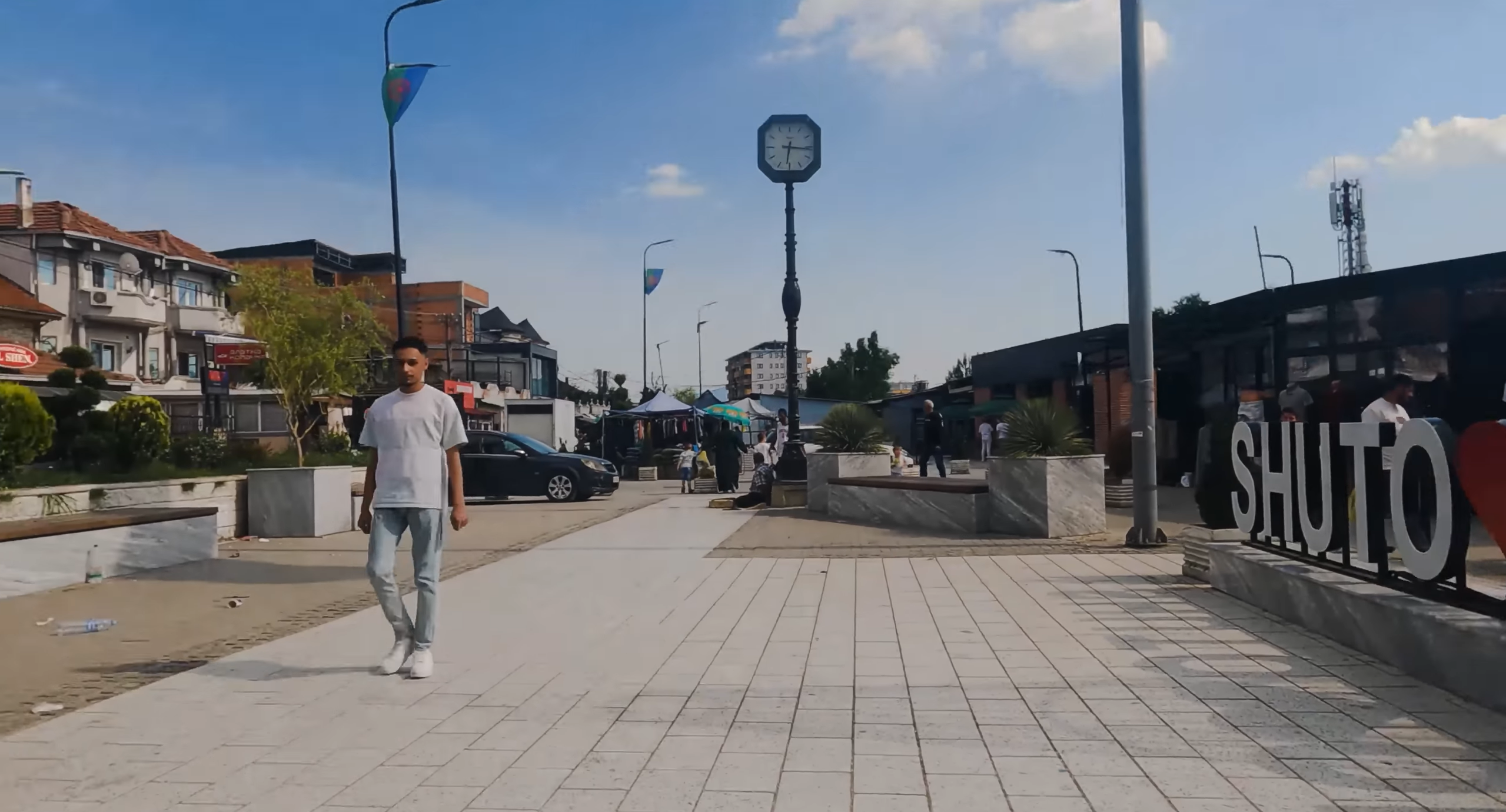
Suto Orizari boulevard near the market

== Demographics ==
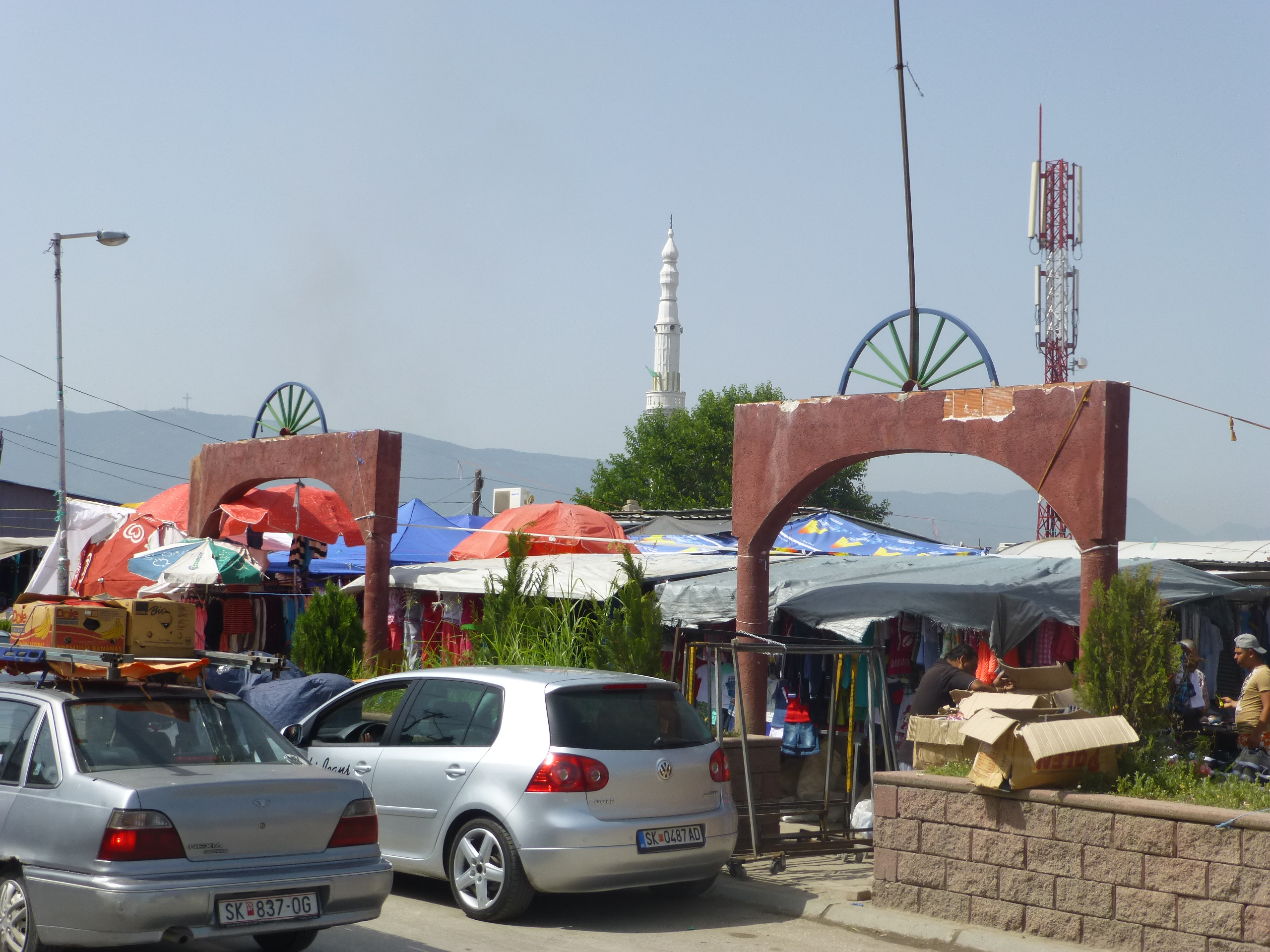
Entrance to the town market

Šuto Orizari is the only municipality in the country where Arlije, a subgroup of Muslim Romani people, make up a majority of the population. Out of a total population of 17,357 in the 2002 census, 13,311 people (76.6%) were of Arlije ethnicity. Other significant ethnic groups include Albanians (2,594 or 14.9%) and Macedonians (962 or 5.5%). During the recent conflict in Kosovo many Romani refugees found shelter here. The overwhelming majority of the inhabitants are Muslims.

Most of the Arlije Muslim Romani population originates from the relocation of families after the 1963 Skopje earthquake. They were later followed by many other families coming from Skopje and other towns in North Macedonia. Romani language is spoken in a large number of dialects and several ones coexist in Skopje. They usually correspond to a single area (Topaanli, Barutči, Gilanska, Prištivačija, etc.) but as the Romani population in Šutka came in recent times and from many neighbourhoods, several dialects are used there and tend to assemble.

According to the 2021 North Macedonia census, the exact number of the population was 25,726.

	2002		2021	
	Number	%	Number	%
TOTAL	22,017	100	25,726	100
Roma	13,342	60.6	11,267	43.8
Albanians	6,675	30.32	8,828	34.32
Macedonians	1438	6.53	906	3.52
Bosniaks	177	0.8	99	0.38
Turks	56	0.25	73	0.28
Serbs	67	0.30	22	0.09
Others / Undeclared / Unknown	262	1.2	46	0.18
Persons for whom data are taken from administrative sources			4,485	17.43

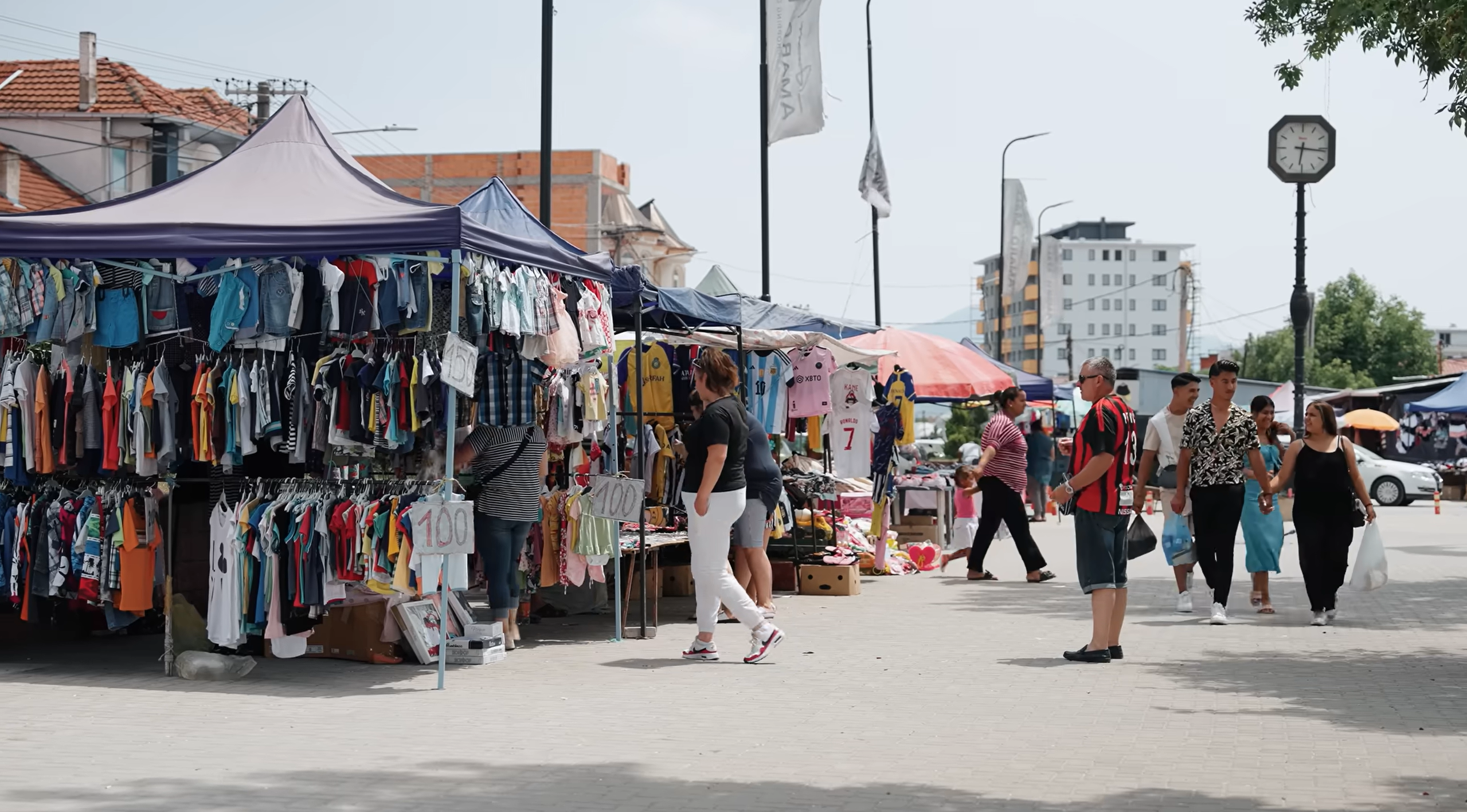
Market in Šuto Orizari

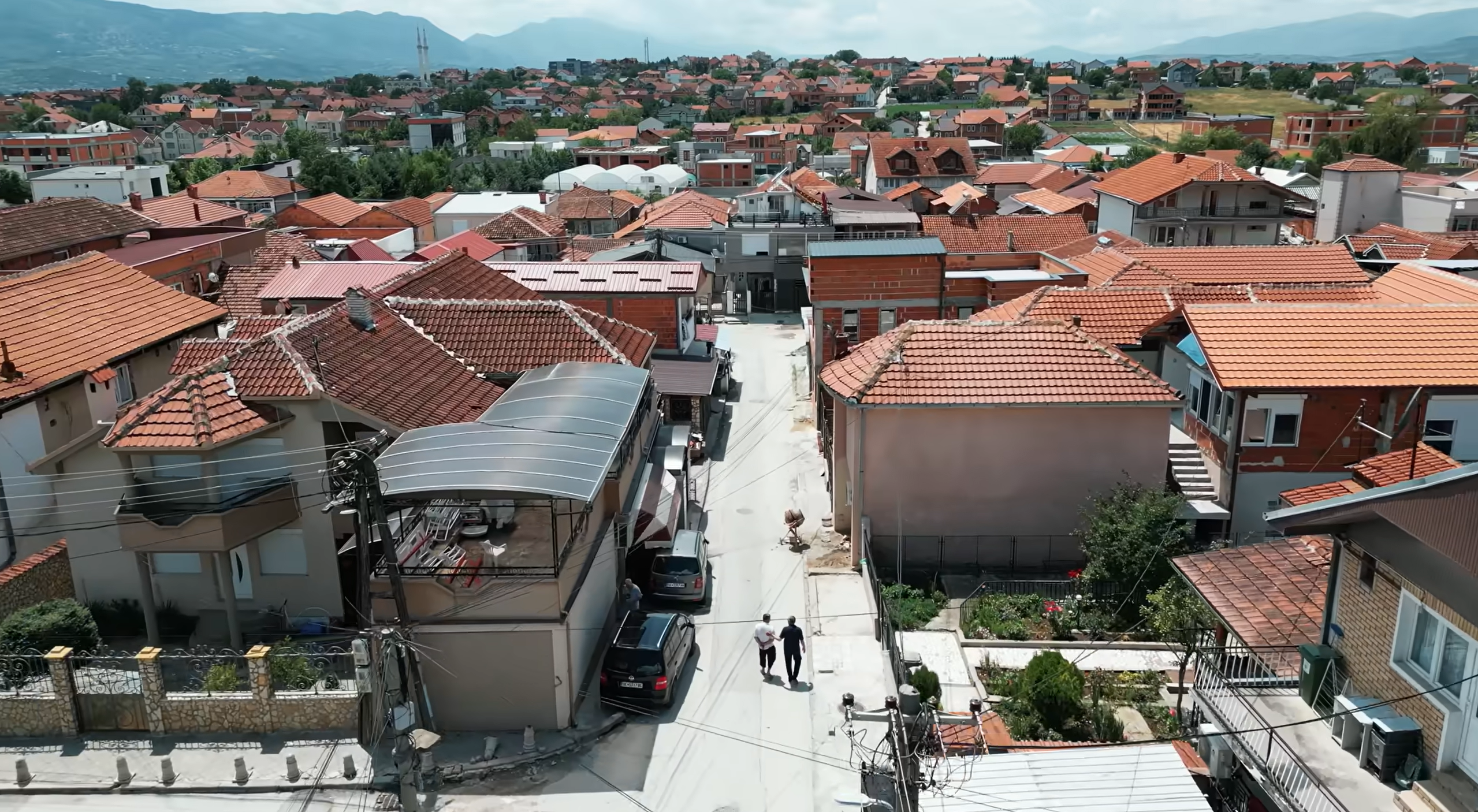
Street in Šuto Orizari

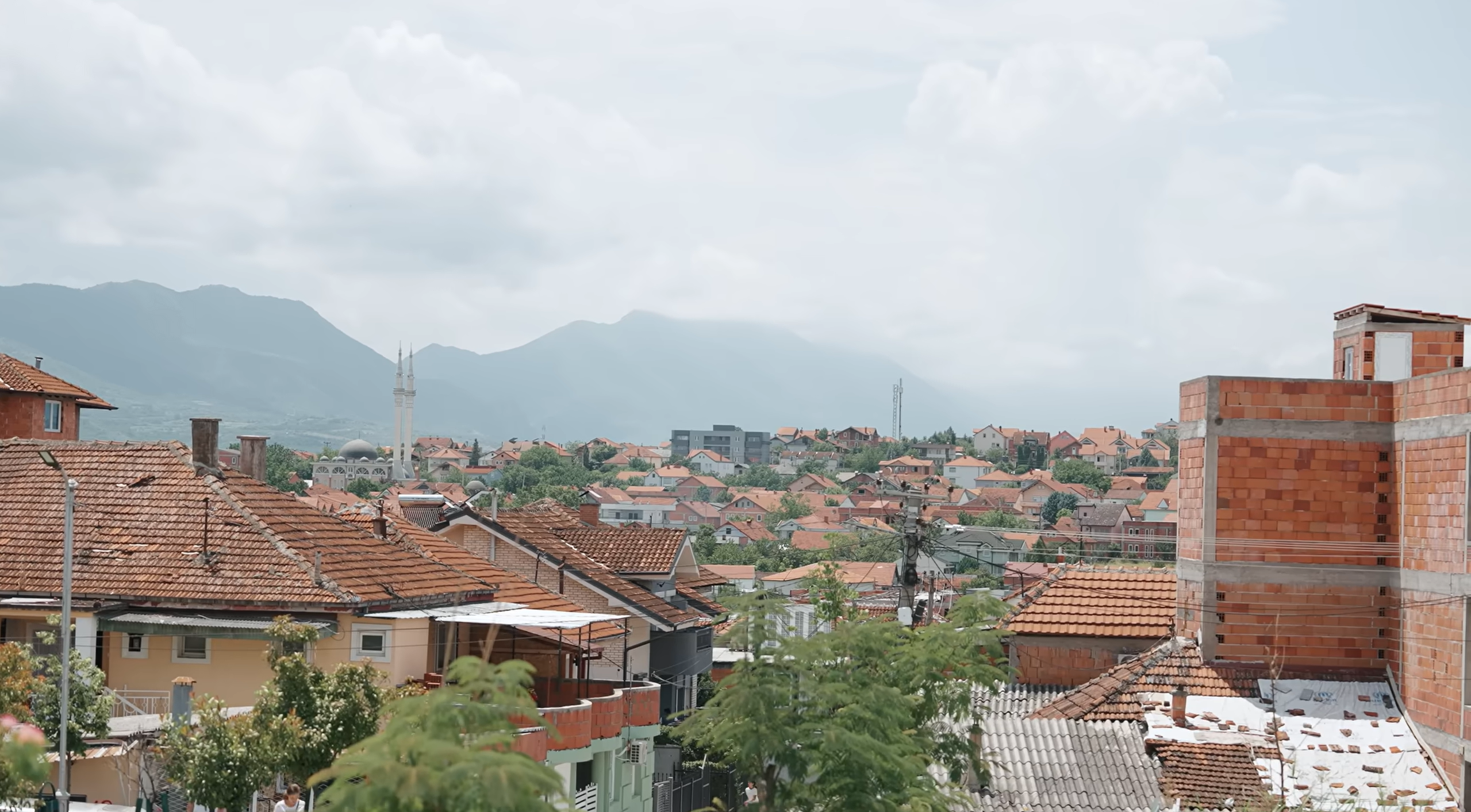
Šuto Orizari skyline

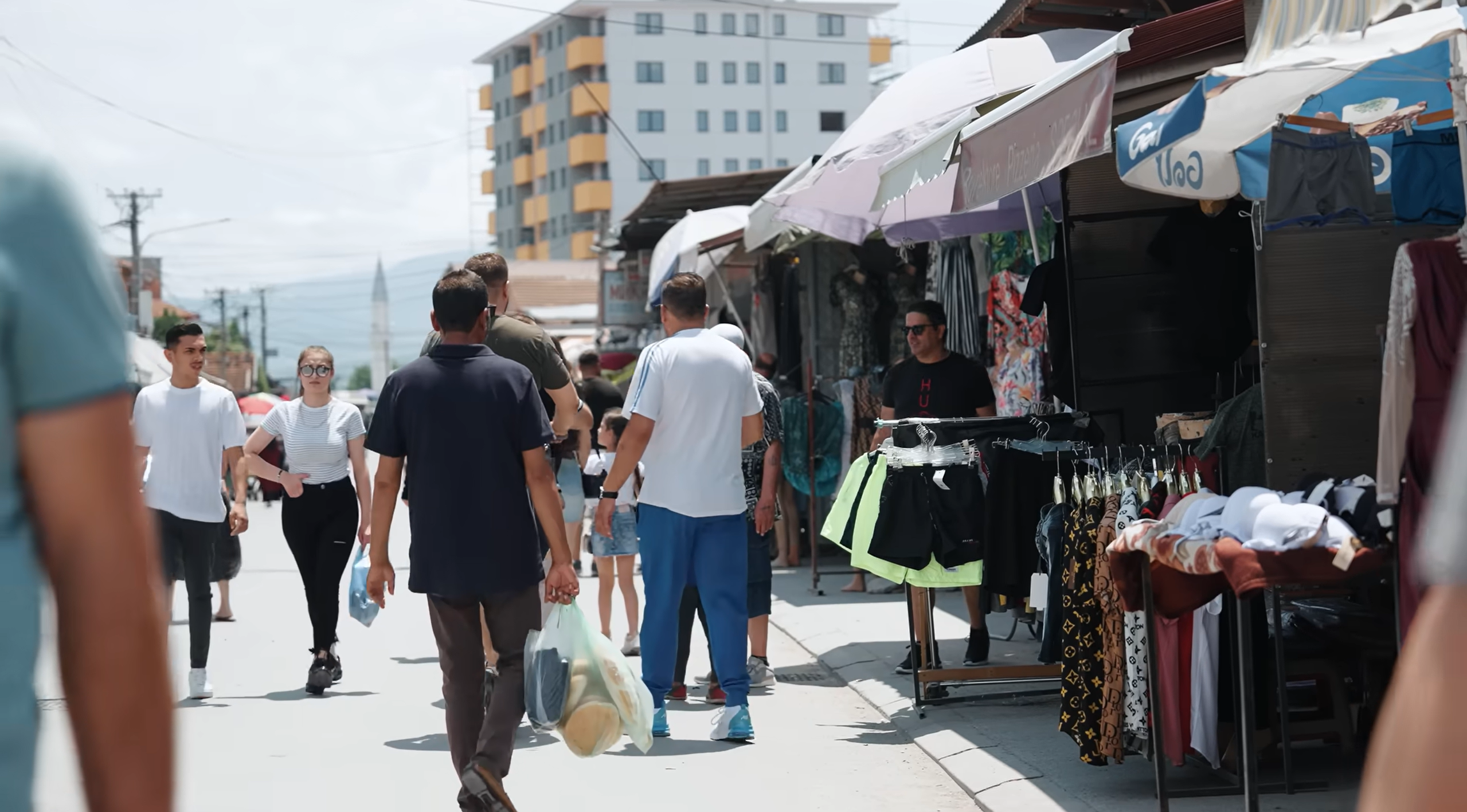
Šuto Orizari Market

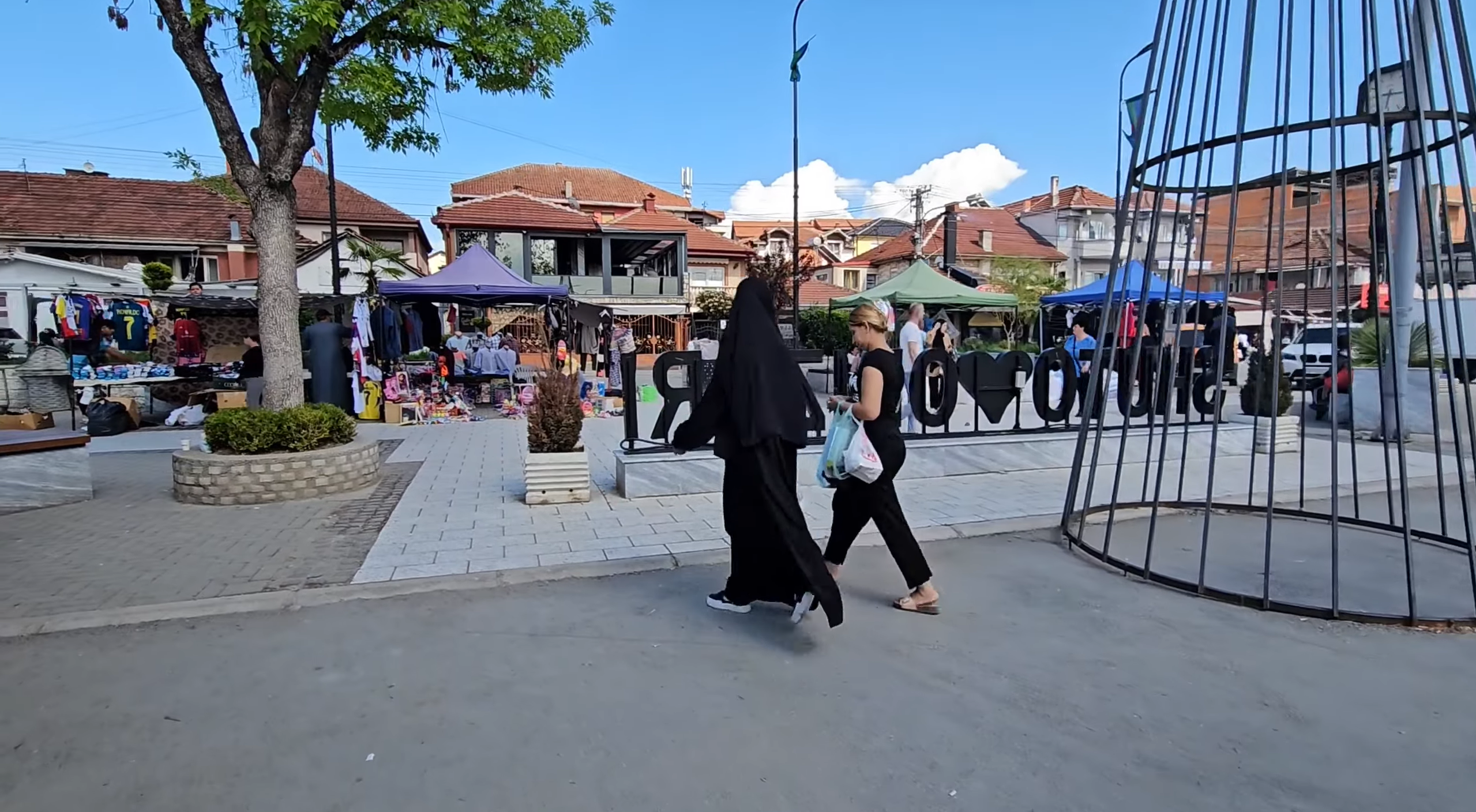
Suto Orizari market with people

== Inhabited places ==
Šuto Orizari settlement:

Year	Macedonian	Albanian	Turks	Romani	Vlachs	Serbs	Bosniaks	Others	Persons for whom data are taken from admin. sources	Total
2002	481	1,205	49	13,201	...	34	138	245	n/a	15,353
2021	451	8,824	73	11,221	...	9	99	45	4,464	25,186

Gorno Orizari village:

Year	Macedonian	Albanian	Turks	Romani	Vlachs	Serbs	Bosniaks	Others	Persons for whom data are taken from admin. sources	Total
2002	444	...	...	...	...	9	...	1	n/a	454
2021	455	4	...	46	...	13	..	1	21	540

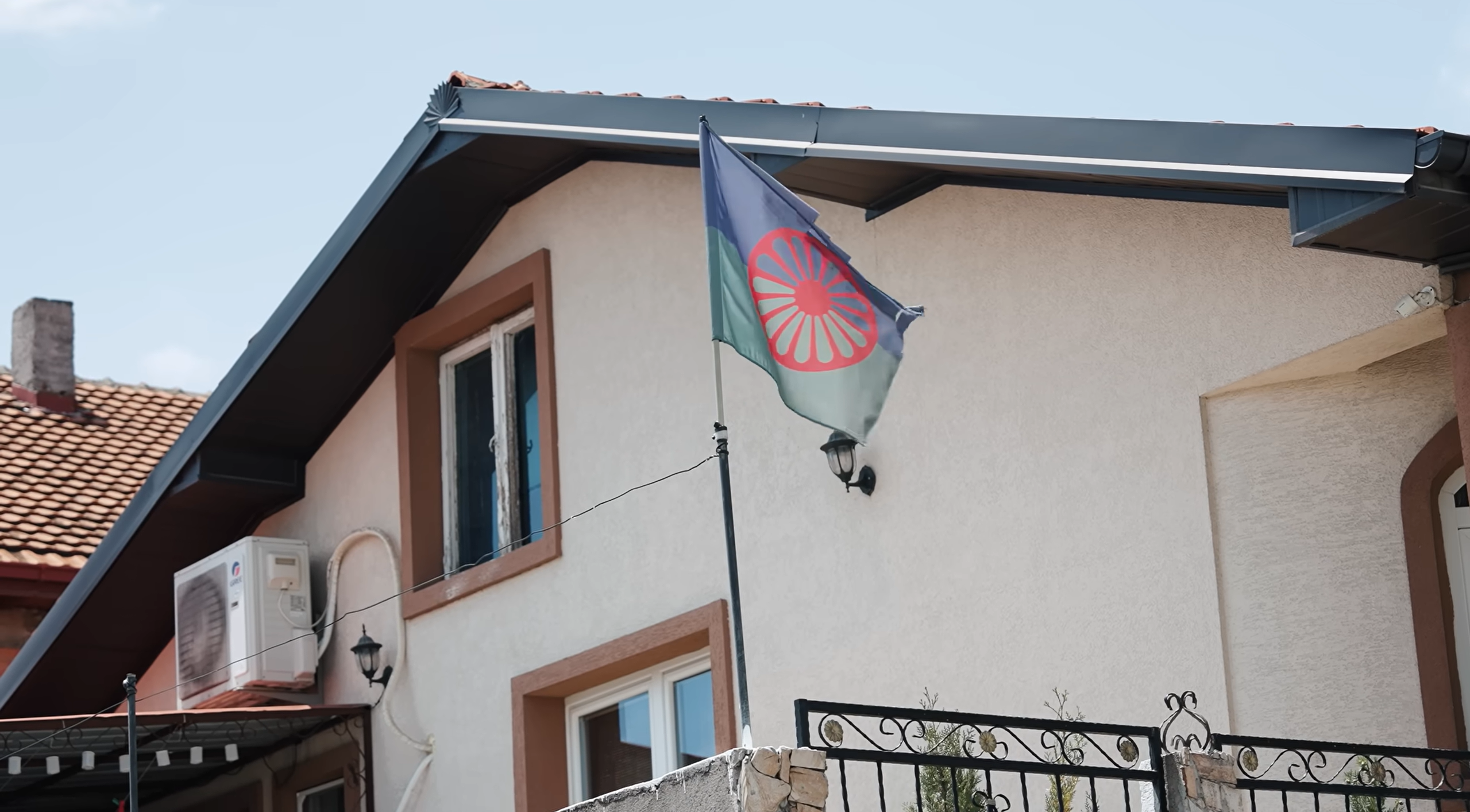
Romani flag on house in Šuto Orizari

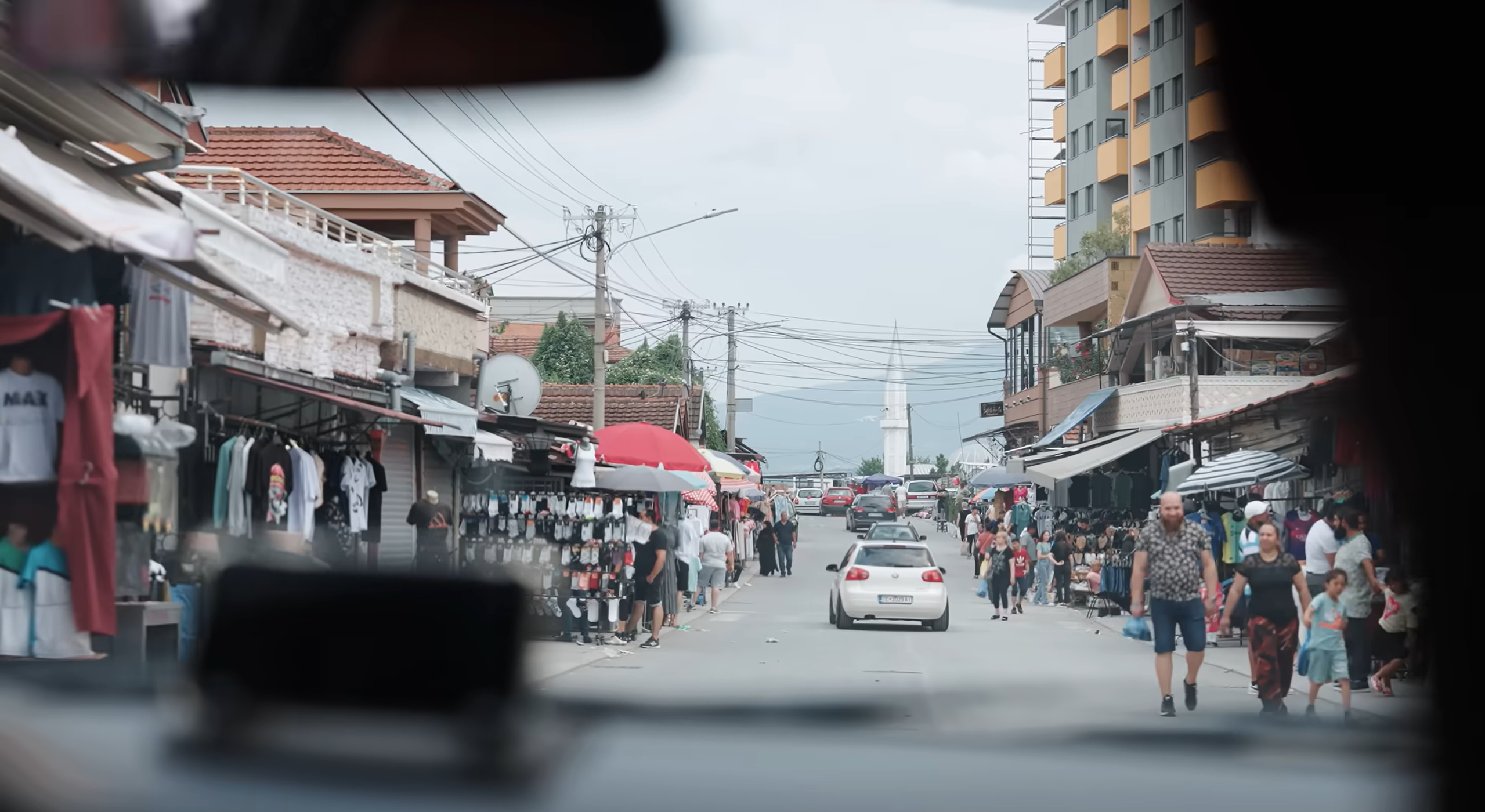
Šuto Orizari Main Street

== Politics ==
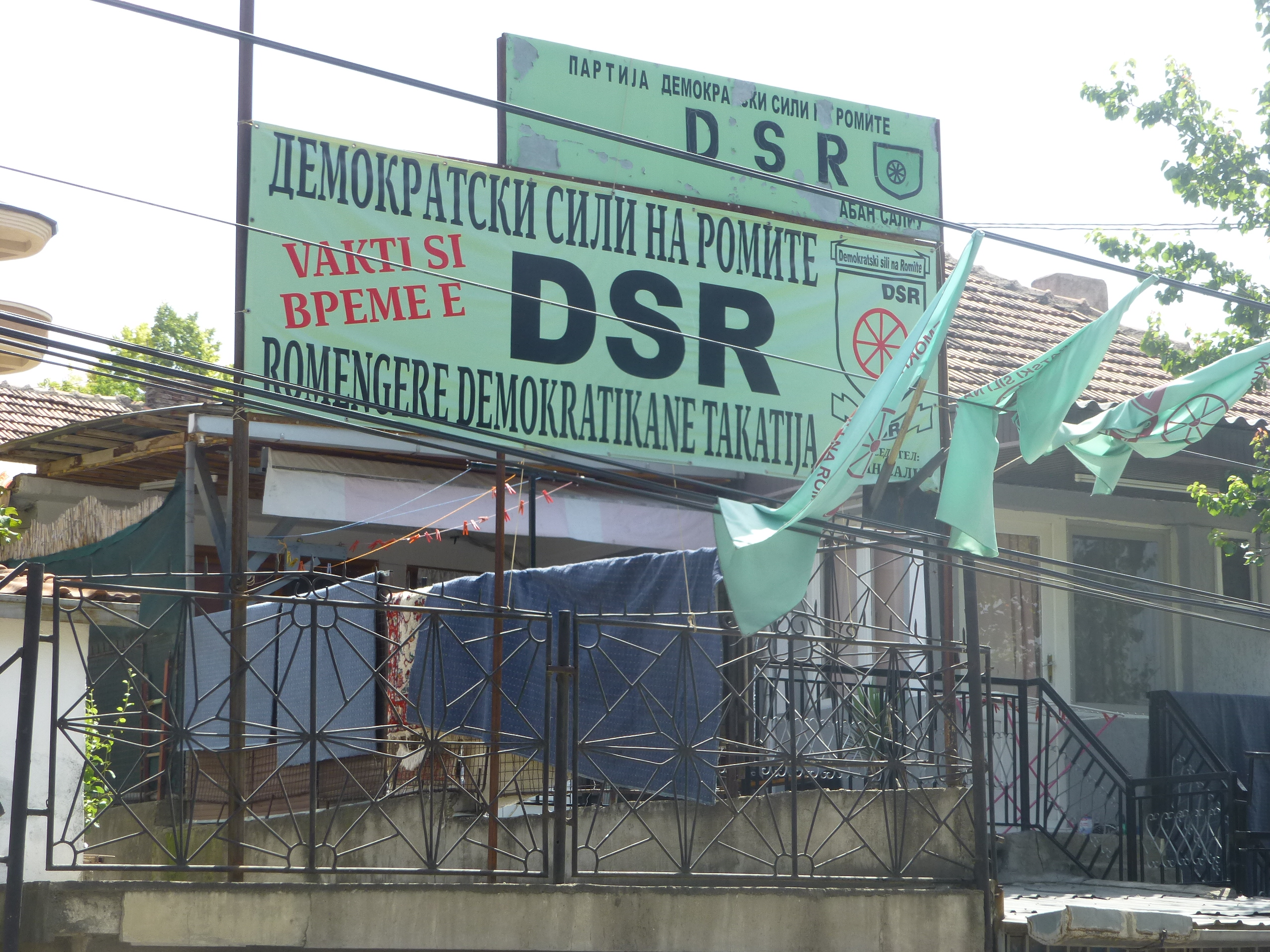
A political party office in Šuto Orizari

The municipality of Šuto Orizari was founded in 1996 following a law on local administration. The creation of a Romani municipality was a move to further emancipate and empower Romani people in the Republic of North Macedonia. At first, many of its inhabitants were skeptical of the project, as they feared the local budget would be too low to run the municipality properly. The first mayor, Nezdet Mustafa, was elected together with his council in autumn 1996 and the municipality became effective in January 1997.

As anywhere in the Republic of North Macedonia, Macedonian is the official language. As an ethnic minority forms more than 20% of the population, its language is also official in the municipality, thus both Balkan Romani and Macedonian are official languages in Šuto Orizari. Albanian is also spoken, but is not an official language. The mayor of the municipality, Kurto Dudush, is Muslim Roma.

In 2009, the Government of the Republic of North Macedonia took further measures to enlarge inclusion of Romani in the education process. The cornerstone of a government-funded secondary school for Šuto Orizari was laid on 10 February 2009, an investment worth 1.6 million euros.

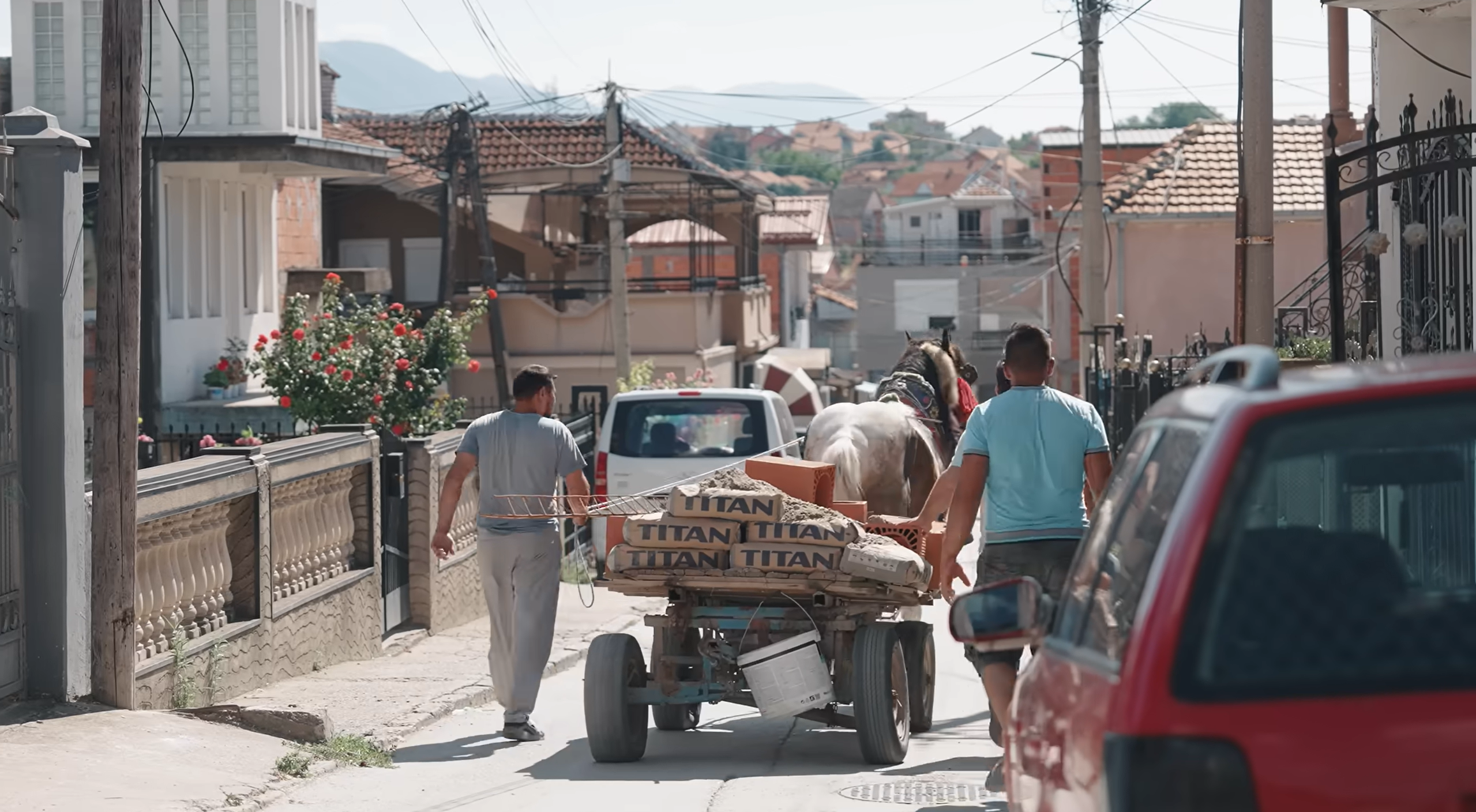
Šuto Orizari street with horse and cart

== Culture ==
As it is the largest Romani settlement in North Macedonia, Šuto Orizari is home to several cultural institutions dedicated to Muslim Roma people. There are for instance a cinema and an amateur theatre company, Theater Roma. It was also home to the Phralipe theatre company, founded in 1970 and a pioneer in Romani theatre, before it moved to Germany in 1990.

Šuto Orizari is the set of three films: Time of the Gypsies by Emir Kusturica (1988), Gypsy Magic (1997), and The Shutka Book of Records by Aleksandar Manic (2005).
