= Romani people in North Macedonia =

Romani in North Macedonia
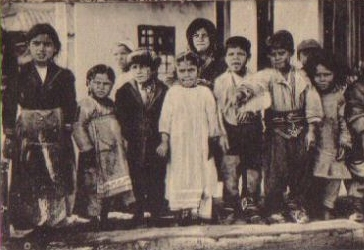
- Macedonian Romani children (around 1900)

Total population
- 46,433 (2021 census)

Languages
- Majority; Balkan Romani, Macedonian; Minority; Albanian

Religion
- Sunni Islam 75%, Christianity 25%

Romani people, known as Macedonian Roma (Macedonian: Македонски Роми, romanized: Makedonski Romi), are one of the constitutional peoples of North Macedonia.

According to the last census from 2021, there were 46,433 people counted as Romani, or 2.53% of the population. The majority are Muslim Romani people. Another 3,843 people have been counted as "Egyptians" (0.2%). Other sources claim the number to be between 80,000 and 260,000 Roma in North Macedonia or approximately 4 to 12% of the total population.

Some of the majority groups are the Arlije and Gurbeti.

The municipality of Šuto Orizari is the only municipality in the world with a Muslim Romani people majority and the only municipality where Balkan Romani is an official language alongside Macedonian. The mayor of the municipality, Kurto Dudush, is an ethnic Roma.

In 2009, the Government of the Republic of North Macedonia took measures to enlarge inclusion of Romani in the education process.

North Macedonia has been the first country in the region which had a minister of Romani ethnicity and also had many Romani people in high government positions. However, there is still much to be done concerning the education and integration of the Romani people.

== History ==
=== Origins ===
The Romani people originate from Northern India, presumably from the northwestern Indian states Rajasthan and Punjab.

The linguistic evidence has indisputably shown that roots of Romani language lie in India: the language has grammatical characteristics of Indian languages and shares with them a big part of the basic lexicon, for example, body parts or daily routines.

More exactly, Romani shares the basic lexicon with Hindi and Punjabi. It shares many phonetic features with Marwari, while its grammar is closest to Bengali.

Genetic findings in 2012 suggest the Romani originated in northwestern India and migrated as a group. According to a genetic study in 2012, the ancestors of present scheduled tribes and scheduled caste populations of northern India, traditionally referred to collectively as the Ḍoma, are the likely ancestral populations of the modern European Roma.

In February 2016, during the International Roma Conference, the Indian Minister of External Affairs stated that the people of the Roma community were children of India. The conference ended with a recommendation to the Government of India to recognize the Roma community spread across 30 countries as a part of the Indian diaspora.

=== History ===
The earliest record of Romani presence in North Macedonia dates back to the late 13th century. During the Ottoman period, some Romani prospered and were able to become middle-class, especially in urban areas. The population of the Romani declined significantly due to the effects of the Balkan Wars. In the 1930s, Skopje was known as a cultural hub for the Romani, in where their population was estimated to be 10,000 (out of a total 70,000 at the time).

During World War II, the Macedonian Romani allied with the Yugoslavi Partisans. For their support, Josip Tito considered creating an autonomous region for the Romani in the Yugoslav Macedonia. Even though the proposal went nowhere, this positive climate would lead to the Macedonian Romani enjoying a cultural renaissance throughout the Socialist era.

In 1971, the Macedonian constitution officially recognized the Romani as an ethnic group. This enabled the sanctioned use of the Romani flag as well as a growth of radio and television broadcasts in the Romani language. In the 1980s, the Romani were pressured to identify as Albanian due to the rise of Kosovar Albanian nationalism. Additionally, the Romani were negatively affected by the Yugoslavian Wars. However, the Romani continued to form many associations and groups to express and research their culture and history. In the early 1990s, an independent Romanistan (a state for the Romani people) was proposed by leaders of the Party for the Complete Emancipation of Roma.

In modern times, the Romani in North Macedonia often face discrimination, higher levels of poverty and are often treated as a "underclass" by the wider society. Compared to other Balkan Romani groups, the Macedonian Romani face less harsh treatment and marginalization but issues continue to persist for the community.

== Language ==
The Romani in North Macedonia speak three different Balkan Romani dialects: Arli (the most prominent of the three), Džambaz, and Burgudži. While 46,433 individuals declared Romani ethnicity in the 2021 census, only 31,721 declared Romani as their mother tongue.

== Religion ==
The majority are Muslim Romani people who are cultural Muslims and some practised Sufism, with a minority of Christian who belong to the Eastern Orthodox Church and a few to Evangelicalism.

== Diaspora ==
=== USA ===
Established mainly in the Bronx where they have established two mosques, the Xoraxane are an Islamic population originating in North Macedonia and surrounding areas of the Balkans, several hundred families of whom came to America beginning in the late 1960s. They maintain minimal ties with other Romani American populations, include engineers and teachers among their number, and have established soccer and other social clubs.

=== Germany ===
Most of them came in the 1960s as guest workers from Yugoslavia, as they were called Yugoslavs back then. The fact that they were Roma and Muslims - from Macedonia, Kosovo, Serbia - was something the guest workers hid for a long time. It was only with the Yugoslavian war in the 1990s, which triggered a large exodus to Western Europe, that the past returned: Muslim Roma from their hometowns suddenly appeared on the doorstep, former neighbors, relatives. Little by little they found each other in their new homeland of Germany. In Düsseldorf they built a mosque. Iman Ajdini, a young theologian from Skopje in Macedonia, preaches in Arli - Romanes, the native language of the congregation members.

== Gallery ==
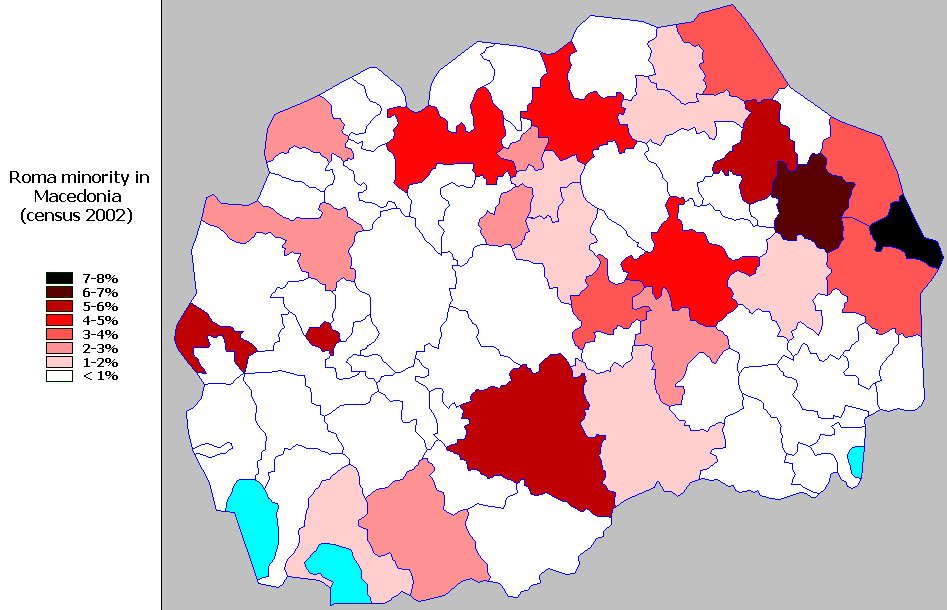
Romani minority in North Macedonia (census 2002)

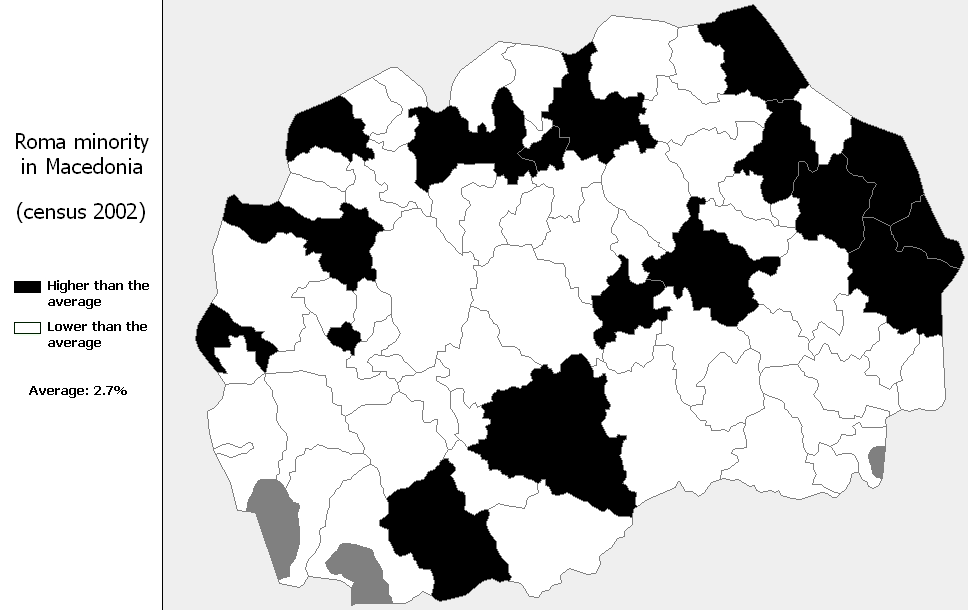
Romani minority in North Macedonia (census 2002)

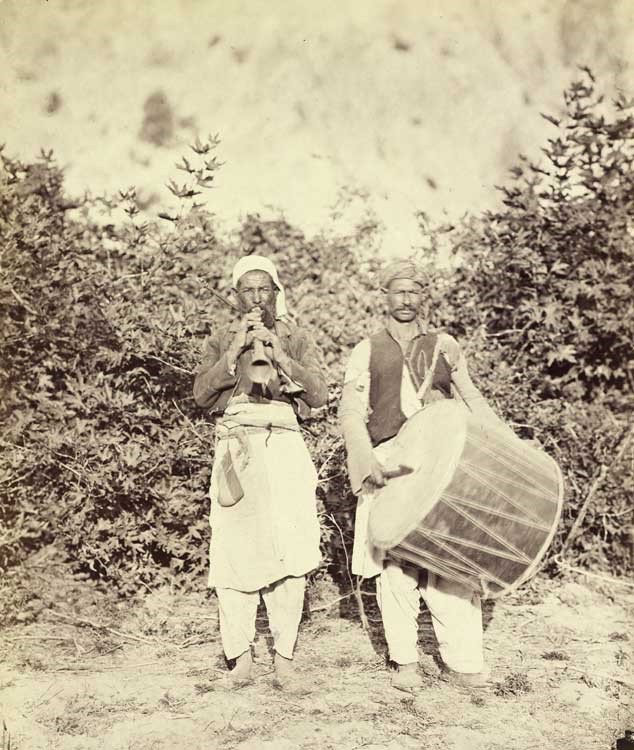
Romani musicians in Macedonia (1863)

== Notable people ==
- Emil Abaz
- Rahim Burhan
- Ferus Mustafov
- Esma Redžepova
- Muharem Serbezovski
- Dehran Asanov
