= Romani people in Germany =

Romano manusha andi Germania (Romani)

Total population
- 170,000-300,000

Regions with significant populations
- Berlin, Cologne, Düsseldorf and Frankfurt

Languages
- Romani (Sinte, Balkan); German; Turkish, Romanian, Slovak, Bulgarian

Religion
- Christianity, Islam, Romani mythology

Romani people in Germany are estimated at around 170,000–300,000, constituting around 0.2–0.4% of the German population. One-third of Germany's Romani belong to the Sinti group. Most speak German or Sinte Romani.

== History ==
The historical perspective of German collective memory regarding Romani people is divided between two completely opposite images: a dominant negative portrayal that sharply contrasts with a romanticized, mystical view that emerged in Germany during the seventeenth century. In chronicles from the fifteenth and sixteenth centuries, Roma are depicted as a nomadic group, described as dark-skinned, unkempt, and dressed in rags, aimlessly wandering across the land. These accounts suggest that Romani people survived through pickpocketing, theft, robbery, fortune-telling, witchcraft, and black magic.

=== Origins ===
The Romani people originated in South Asia, likely in the regions of present-day Punjab, Rajasthan and Sindh. Research often supports an origin in present-day North India. Genetic findings in 2012 suggest the Romani migrated as a group. According to a genetic study in 2012 about the ancestors of present scheduled tribes and scheduled caste populations of present-day northern India, traditionally referred to collectively as the Ḍoma, are the likely ancestral populations of modern European Roma. Linguistic studies have argued that roots of Romani languages lie in what is now India: the languages have grammatical characteristics of Indian languages and share with them a part of the basic lexicon, for example, body parts or daily routines. More exactly, Romani shares the basic lexicon with Hindi and Punjabi. It shares many phonetic features with Marwari, while its grammar is closest to Bengali.

In February 2016, during the International Roma Conference, the Indian Minister of External Affairs stated that the people of the Roma community were children of India. The conference ended with a recommendation to the Government of India to recognize the Roma community spread across 30 countries as a part of the Indian diaspora.

Map of Europe showing Romani demographics

=== Migration to Germany ===
There are different Christian Roma groups like the Lalleri, Kalderash, Čurara, Boyash, Wallachian Roma, Gitanos, and Muslim Roma/Xoraxane like Arlije, Gurbeti, Romanlar in Turkey. Some People of Roma ethnicity came as Gastarbeiter to Germany from countries such as Turkey, former Yugoslavia, Greece, Spain and Italy. Especially Turkish speaking Xoraxane-Roma from Bulgaria, Romania and Turkey, declared themselves as Turks only and are viewed as Turks by Germans. Since the Kosovo War in 1998-1999, Romani people in Kosovo, Ashkali and Balkan Egyptians also came to Germany.

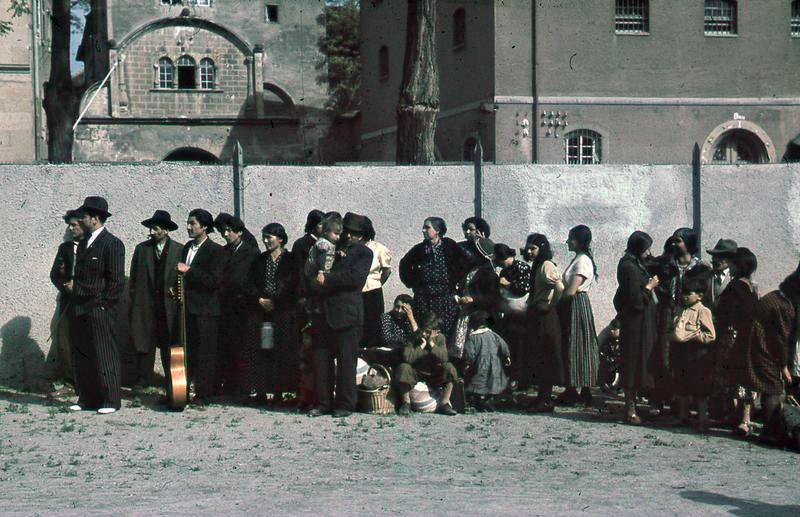
Romani civilians in Asperg, Germany are rounded up for deportation by Nazi authorities on 22 May 1940. Colorized.

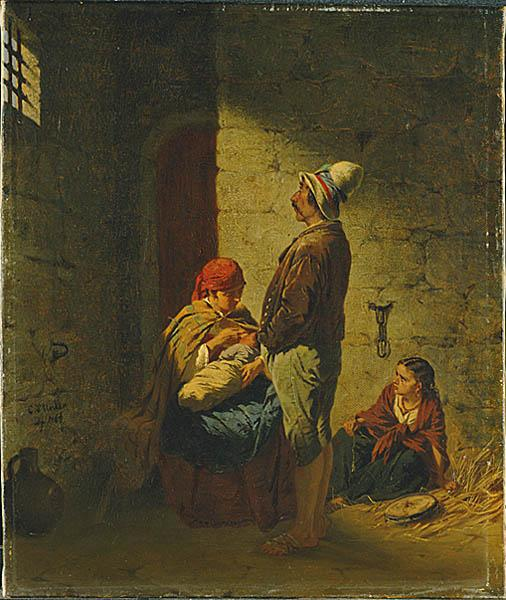
Gypsy Family in Prison, 1864 painting by Carl d´Unker, a Swedish painter living and working in Düsseldorf. An actual imprisoned family served as the models. The reason for their imprisonment remains unknown

== See also ==
- Central Council of German Sinti and Roma
- Documentation and Cultural Centre of German Sinti and Roma
- Ethnic groups in Germany
- Romani Holocaust
- The Holocaust in Germany
