= Romani people in Greece =

Ethnic group

Total population
- ≈ 110,000

Regions with significant populations
- Attica, Central Macedonia, Eastern Macedonia and Thrace, Western Greece, Thessaly, Central Greece, Crete, Epirus, Peloponnese

Languages
- Romani, Greek, Romano-Greek, Balkan Romani

Religion
- Greek Orthodox, Sunni Islam, Romani mythology

The Romani people in Greece, or Romá (Greek: Ρομάνι/Ρομά), are called Tsinganoi (Greek: Τσιγγάνοι), Athinganoi (Αθίγγανοι), or the more derogatory term Gyftoi (Greek: Γύφτοι). On 8 April 2019, the Greek government stated that the number of Romani citizens in Greece is around 110,000. Other estimates have placed the number of Romani people resident in Greece as high as 350,000 and 750,000.

== History ==
=== Origin ===
The ancestors of the Romani people originated in South Asia, likely from the regions of present-day Punjab, Rajasthan and Sindh. Linguistic evidence has shown that roots of Romani language lie in what is now India: the language has grammatical characteristics of Indo-Aryan languages and shares with them a big part of the basic lexicon, for example, body parts or daily routines. The language has been significantly influenced by contact with other languages, particularly Persian, Armenian, Byzantine Greek. It's grammar and phonology also reflect South Slavic influence.

=== Arrival in Europe ===
A number of words in the Romani language originating from early Armenian indicate that Romanies were in Armenia prior to linguistic changes of the 9th century. From Armenia, they migrated through Anatolia, before arriving in the Balkans—Europe proper—during the Byzantine period. They are believed to have been present in Constantinople by the 9th century, possibly as early as the 7th century. The shift in the self-identification of the Romani people from "Doma" to "Roma"/"Romani" is believed to have taken place during the Romanies' arrival and settlement in the Balkans during the Byzantine era. "Roma"/"Romani" is believed to have been influenced by the Medieval Greek word Romaios, meaning Eastern Roman—inhabitants of the Byzantine Empire.

The name Gypsy (Gyftos = Γύφτος) sometimes used for the Romani people was first given to them by the Greeks, who supposed them to be Egyptian in origin. Due to their nomadic nature, they are not concentrated in a specific geographical area, but are dispersed all over the country. The majority of the Romanies in Greece yet are Hellenized and Orthodox Christians who speak the Romani language in addition to Greek, or the Romano-Greek language, like the Finikas Romika. There are several other dialects spoken by the Roma In Greece, as the Agios Athanasios-Balkan Romani, the Parakalamos-Romacilikanes, or the Volos Sevlengere Roma. Mostly Muslim Roma who live in Western Thrace speak Turkish and the Rumelian Romani dialect. Sedentary Romanies from the Serres region believe their Ancestors were once taken from Egypt by the Ottomans in 1517 to work of the Land of Turkish Feudallords in Rumelia. Also in Evliya Çelebi's Seyahatname of 1668, he mentioned that, at the time, the Roma from Komotini (Gümülcine) swore their Ancestors came from Egypt. Banyan merchants came once via Indo-Roman trade relations and settled there for a while in Roman Egypt, so their Ancestors may be Doms in Egypt.

=== Migration to Turkey ===
During the Population exchange between Greece and Turkey in 1923, different Muslim Turkish Roma groups from Greece, like the Tütünčides (Tobacco traders/workers) or the Sepetčides (Basketmakers) moved to Turkey, and were called Mübadil Romanlar.

=== Settlements ===
The Roma in Greece live scattered on the whole territory of the country, mainly in the suburbs. Notable centres of Romani life in Athens are Agia Varvara which has a very successful Romani community and Ano Liosia where conditions are poorer. Roma largely maintain their own customs and traditions. Although a large number of Roma has adopted a sedentary and urban way of living, there are still settlements in some areas. The nomads at the settlements often differentiate themselves from the rest of the population. They number 200,000 according to the Greek government. According to the National Commission for Human Rights that number is closer to 250,000 and according to the Greek Helsinki Watch group to 300,000.

As a result of neglect by the state, among other factors, the Romani communities in Greece face several problems including high rates of child labour and abuse, low school attendance, police discrimination and drug trafficking. The most serious issue is the housing problem since many Roma in Greece still live in tents, on properties they do not own, making them subject to eviction. In the past decade these issues have received wider attention and some state funding.

On two occasions, the European Committee of Social Rights found Greece in violation of the European Social Charter by its policy towards Roma in the field of housing. Furthermore, between 1998-2002, 502 Albanian Roma children disappeared from the Greek Foundation for children Agia Varvara. These cases were not investigated by the Greek authorities until the European Union forced an investigation, which only led to the recovery of 4 children. The children who were sold were presumably sold to human traffickers for sexual slavery or organ harvesting, according to a report submitted by the Greek government to the European Commission.

=== Religion ===
The majority of the Romanies in Greece are Orthodox Christian like the groups Medvedara (Bear-leader), Katsiveli, Fitsiria, Mandopolini etc., while a small part of them, the Erli/Erlides (Greek: Ερλίδες), and Tourkogyftos are Muslim Roma concentrated in Western Thrace.

== Crime ==
According to data released by the Hellenic Police, individuals of Romani descent are reported to account for 53% of theft and burglary offenses documented in Greece.

== Culture ==
Music and blacksmithing represent traditional occupations within Greek Romani communities. The zurna and davul constitute widely appreciated instruments among Greek Romani musical practitioners. Numerous performers within the Greek Laïko genre possess Romani heritage.

Pies and breads form the most fundamental part of the Greek Romani diet. Legumes, vegetables, and root crops—cooked either individually or in various combinations—form the basis of their everyday cooking, much like the broader tradition of daily Greek cuisine. the Greek Roma are deeply familiar with the wild greens found in the Greek landscape—from wild chicory and dock to sow thistle, amaranth, poppy greens, *skatzikia* and more. They enjoy them boiled and dressed with oil and lemon, or sautéed with garlic and tomato. It consists of eggplants, Florina peppers, and onions. *tsoureaki zoumi* is a simple, Romani oil-based meal, characterized by an abundance of sauce.

== Notable Roma from Greece ==
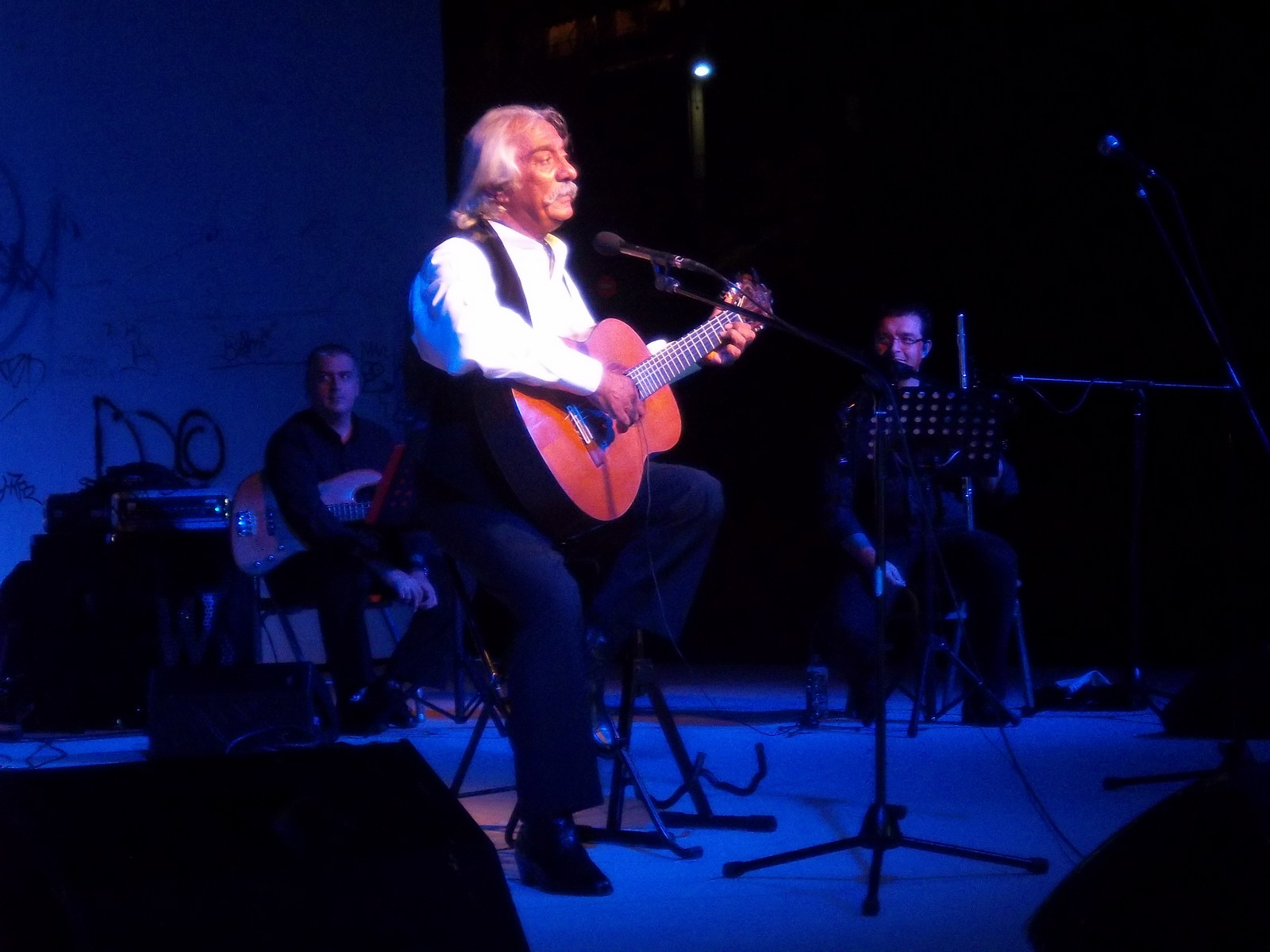
Kostas Hatzis

- Manolis Angelopoulos, singer
- Kostas Hatzis, singer and musician
- Irini Merkouri, singer
- Christos Patsatzoglou, football player (retired)
- Vassilis Saleas, clarinetist
- Eleni Vitali, singer and composer
- Zafeiris Melas, singer
- Panagiotis Paiteris, football player

== See also ==
- Minorities in Greece
- Muslim minority in Greece
- The Blond Angel Case
- Ancient Greece–Ancient India relations
