= Basketry Museum of the Roma =

Coordinates: 41.0780621°N 25.4797254°E

The Basketry Museum of the Roma (Greek: Το Μουσείο Καλαθοπλεκτικής των Ρομά, romanized: To Mouseío Kalathoplektikís ton Romá) is a folk museum in the Thrylorio/Trala/Tralangere Village of the municipality of Komotini of the Rhodope regional unit, in Western Thrace Greece. The museum collection represents examples from Greece, Bulgaria and Turkey.

== History of the museum ==
The museum was founded in 1995 and specializes in the traditional basketry of the Kalathoplektikís Christian Romani people from Greece, Roma basketmakers from Bulgaria, Sepetčides Muslim Romani people and Sevlengere Romani who are Greek Orthodox. The museum is located in Thrylorio village, which is approximately 10 km from Komotini. The craft of basketry is one of the oldest professions of the Roma, and the skill involved is well respected.

=== Exhibitions ===
One room displays the materials and tools, as well as the process of basket making. Other rooms display baskets from various regions and a basketry workroom of the Roma. The exhibits also include photographs of ancient Greek basketry as they were depicted on pottery. The interpretive texts describe these works in relation to the female deities of vegetation used in basket making, such as the archetype goddess, Gaia, Demeter, Rhea, and Hectate.The baskets represented in the museum were made from willow, hazel wood, reed, and ossier. They were used in fishing, farming, domestic use and for storing.

=== Cultures ===
The Kalathoplektikís are Orthodox Christian Romani people in Greece. These basket makers have been in this area of Greece since the 11th century. They speak Greek and Romano-Greek language. The Kalathoplektikís are Orthodox Christian Romani people in Greece. They speak Greek and Romano-Greek language. The Basketmaker Roma, in Sepečides Romani also known as Sevlengere Roma, (in Turkish known as Sepetçiler) are a Roma group, who speak Greek, Turkish, Sepečides Romanes from Saloniki, Greece and those who settled once in the Ottoman Empire Salonica vilayet, who belongend to the Southern Balkan Rumelian Romani. During the Population exchange between Greece and Turkey, at 1923, some Sepetčides Muslim Roma departed from Thessaloniki to settle in Turkey. Their descendants speak only Turkish today. Greek Sevlengere Roma speak Greek and a dialect of Sepetčides/Sevlengere Romanes. Bulgarian basketmakers who lived in parts of Thrace are also represented in the museum. The Sepedji (basket makers) in Shumen, speak a different dialect and are not related to the Roma basket makers from Greece and Turkey.
