= Romani people in Turkey =

Ethnic group

Romanlar

Total population
- 500,000–2,000,000

Regions with significant populations
- Istanbul, East Thrace, Marmara region, Aegean Region, İzmir Province

Languages
- Turkish as first language, in lesser case Rumelian Turkish, nearly extinct Sepečides Romani and Rumelian Romani

Religion
- Sunni Islam, Sufism of Qadiriyya - Tariqa

Related ethnic groups
- Other Roma, Loms, Doms

The Romani people in Turkey (Turkish: Türkiye'deki Romanlar) are a Romani subgroup in the Republic of Türkiye. The majority are Sunni Muslims, mostly of Sufi orientation. The majority speak Turkish as their first language and have adopted Turkish culture. Many have denied their Romani background over the centuries in order to become more accepted by the host population. They are primarily concentrated in western Turkey, particularly in East Thrace (European Turkey).

Their official name in Turkey has been Romanlar since 1996. They are also called Şopar ("Gypsy kid") in Rumelian Romani dialect, and Manuş ("Human") or Çingene ("Gypsy") in Turkish, while once in Ottoman Turkish they were named Cingân ("Gypsy"), Kıptî ("Copts") and Mısırlı ("Egyptians"). As Gastarbeiter some Turkish Roma came to Germany and Austria and other European countries and fully assimilated in Turkish European communities.

There are an estimated 500,000–2,000,000 Romani people in Turkey.

== History ==
There are records of the presence of Romani people from AD 800 in Thrace, known in Greek as Athinganoi. At the time of the Rome–Constantinople schism of 1054, Athinganoi settled outside the Walls of Constantinople. Later in the Ottoman times, this quarter was named Sulukule, said to be the oldest Roma settlement in Europe.

With the expansion of the Ottoman Empire, Turkish speaking Muslim Romani people settled in Rumelia (southeastern Europe) under Ottoman rule. The Ottoman Turkish Historian Evliya Çelebi explains in his Seyahatnâme, that Mehmed the Conqueror in 1453, took Muslim Roma from Balat, Didim and former Menteshe, as well as the irreligious Roma from Gümülcine, and settled them in Istanbul, but both groups did not get along well, and some of the Gümülcine groups returned. He also wrote, that the language of the Roma from Gümülcine have Banyan merchants roots. Ottoman Archives of the 18th century and 19th century talk about 4 clans of those called Türkmen Kıpti (Gypsy). The groups in these historical documents may be related to the contemporary Balkan groups who spoke Turkish only with few Romani words in their jargon and who are often Alevis of Bektashi Order, as a separate group of other Roma people in Rumelia. They once migrated from Anatolia and settled finally in the Balkans and Crimea. Uniquely to Ottoman history, the Muslim Roma people were given their own Sanjak at the Kırklareli Province, by the order of Suleiman the Magnificent at 1530. Until today the Turkish Roma see Thrace as their Homeland. The Turkish Historian Reşat Ekrem Koçu, explained that Muslim (Horahane), Eastern Orthodox (Dasikane) and Pagan Roma (Gadjikane) Groups lived in the Ottoman Empire. He also explained that the Christian Lom people who lived in Istanbul converted to Islam in the 19th century

=== Origin ===
The Romani people in Turkey are of mixed ancestry. According to their own oral tradition, (but it varies in some stories), their ancestors once came from Hindustan. The Early Romani originate from the Indian subcontinent, especially from Rohri in the Sukkur District of Sindh. The linguistic evidence has indisputably shown that the roots of the Romani language lie in Central India: The language has grammatical characteristics of Indian languages and shares with them a big part of the basic lexicon, for example, body parts or daily routines. More precisely, Romani shares the basic lexicon with Sanskrit and Prakrit. In February 2016, during the International Roma Conference, the Indian Minister of External Affairs stated that the people of the Roma community were "children of India". The conference ended with a recommendation to the Government of India to recognize the Roma community, spread across 30 countries, as a part of the Indian diaspora.

=== Genetic ===
Genetic findings in 2012 suggest the Early Romani originated in Indian subcontinent. Another genetic study shows that Turkish Roma are related to the Changar tribe from Pakistan of Punjab. While the Early Romani people traces back to the Indian subcontinent, gene flow from the Ottoman Turks spilled over and established a higher frequency of the Y-haplogroups J and E3b in Balkan Roma Groups. Greeks and South Slavs DNA also influenced the Balkans Roma people. The genetics of peoples of the Caucasus also influenced the genetics of Roma people.

=== Migration to Turkey ===
During the Population exchange between Greece and Turkey in 1923, different Muslim Roma groups from Greece such as the Sepetčides (Basketmakers) or the Tütünčides (tobacco workers) moved to Turkey, and were called Mübadil Romanlar. Some Roma who were tobacco laborers from Greece became active members in the Communist Party of Turkey (historical).

Turkish-speaking Muslim Roma migrated in waves from Bulgaria to Turkey over the years between 1878 - 1989, together with many Turks and Pomaks. Many Turkish-speaking tribes known for their pipe-and-drum bands, who were descendants of the Turcoman Gypsies went to Istanbul following the Bulgarian Declaration of Independence.

In the early 1950s, Muslim Roma from Bulgaria came to Turkey and settled in Çanakkale and its surroundings.

In the period from 1953 to 1968, Muslim Roma and Turks from Yugoslavia emigrated to Turkey.

== Demographics ==
The majority of the Romani people in Turkey live in East Thrace, Marmara region and Aegean Region. Cities with a high percentage of Romani people is Istanbul.

The number of Roma people, according to estimates as of 2010, is around 500 thousand people, their number in some provinces of Turkey (ordered by their share of the total population) has been estimated:

- Edirne – 50 300 (12,88%)
- Tekirdağ – 27 700 (3,47%)
- Eskişehir – 20 000 (2,62%)
- Kırklareli – 6 000 (2,17%)
- Muğla – 12 550 (1,54%)
- Balıkesir – 14 500 (1,26%)
- Çanakkale – 5 800 (1,18%)
- İzmir – 45 000 (1,14%)
- Bursa – 26 570 (1,02%)
- Erzurum – 7 400 (0,96%)
- Erzincan – 2 000 (0,94%)
- Kayseri – 3 000 (0,32%)
- Hatay – 1 400 (0,09%)

=== Istanbul Province ===
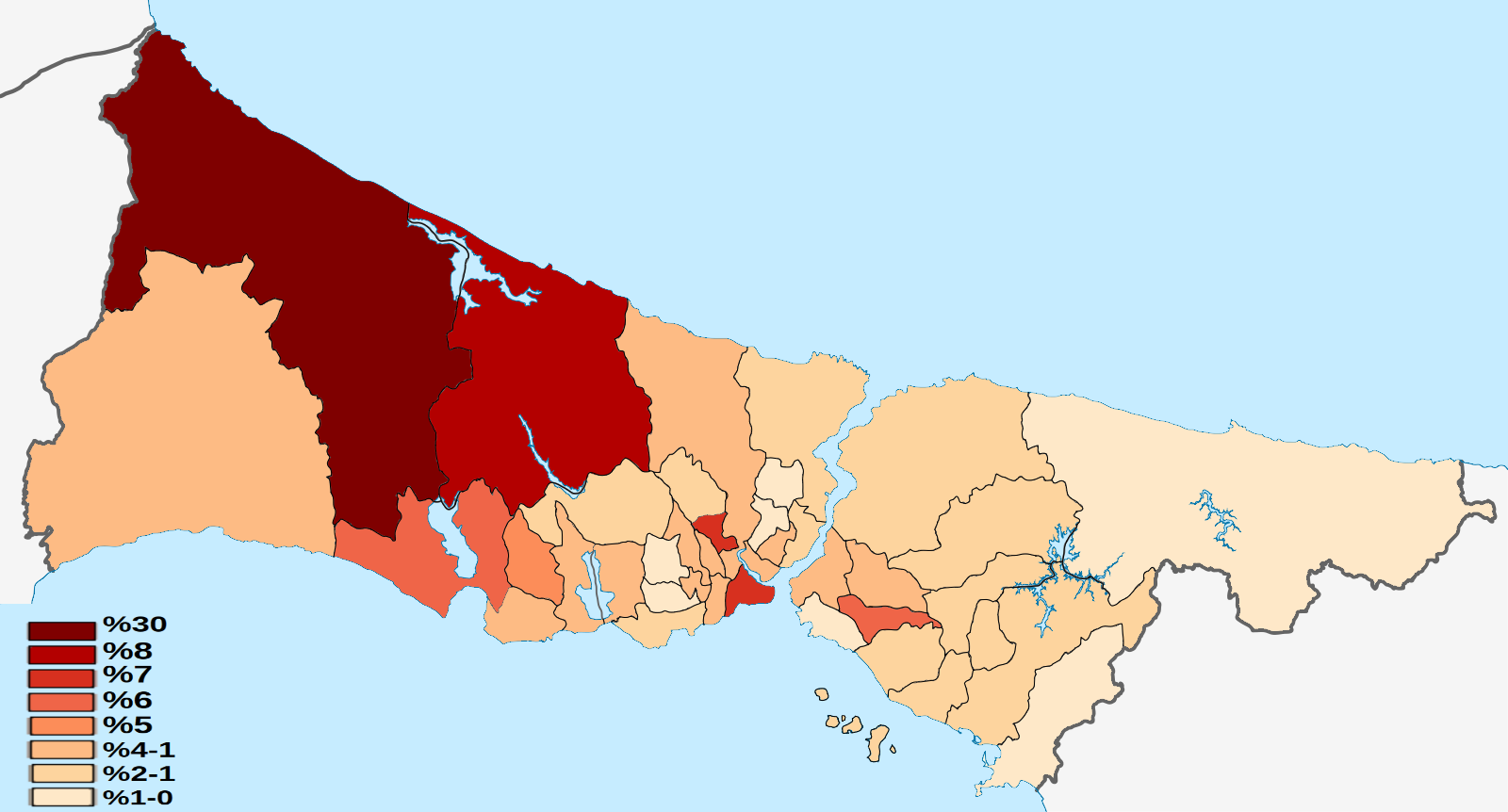
Share of Gypsies in Istanbul Province, by district.

Studies by various gypsy organizations in 2019 show that around 480,000 Gypsies live in Istanbul Province. Their share of the total population in 20 out of 39 districts where they have a higher share is as follows:

- Çatalca – 30,30%
- Arnavutköy – 8,10%
- Gaziosmanpaşa – 7,80%
- Fatih – 7,60%
- Ataşehir – 6,40%
- Büyükçekmece – 6,20%
- Esenyurt – 5,20%
- Beyoğlu – 4,50%
- Avcılar – 4,25%
- Şişli – 4,10%
- Küçükçekmece – 3,95%
- Silivri – 3,80%
- Bayrampaşa – 3,60%
- Beylikdüzü – 3,10%
- Zeytinburnu – 3,05%
- Üsküdar – 2,70%
- Esenler – 2,68%
- Ümraniye – 2,26%
- Sultangazi – 1,91%
- Kağıthane – 1,75%

== Culture ==
The Turkified Romani speak Turkish as there first language and assimilated fully in Turkish culture and are cultural Muslims, based on Sunni Islam in the Hanafi school, and practise religious male circumcision, engagements and weddings on a grand scale. Burying the foreskin after circumcision in a cemetery near or the garden of a mosque is a tradition amongst the Muslim Roma. A foreskin is looked as unclean, and the tradition of a Kirve (the godfather who pays for the celebrations) is taken by Alevism-Bektashism. The Roma bands and their special music in 9/8 beat and songs are particularly well known in Turkey. The majority deny their Romani origins and describe themselves as Turks and are proud to adhere to the motto "How happy is the one who says I am a Turk". They see themselves as Turks and have the same cultural similarities with Turks, and no similarities with Christian Roma from Europe. Belly dance, performed by women and men. In Edirne, they hold the Kakava festival every year.

Conservative Romani groups are, among others, the long-established Tekkekapılı, Kağıtçılar (Papermakers), the semi-nomadic Bandırmalı, (named after Bandırma, but their ancestors once came from Greece around 1923), who all live in Selamsız Romani-quarter in Üsküdar. The Kağıtçılar, in particular, have their own dialect that is not understood by other Roma groups in their neighborhood. Turkish-speaking Roma from Turkey distance themselves from other non-Turkish Roma groups, especially from Christian Roma, they call them Yabancı (foreigners), while Christian Roma regard them simple as Turks (term for Muslims), because they have no Romanipen.

One of the most cherished dishes in Turkish Romani cuisine is known as 'Gypsy Pickles' ('Çingene Turşusu'). This flavorful and spicy pickle is prepared by fermenting an assortment of vegetables, including cucumbers, carrots, and cabbage, along with a mixture of spices and herbs. Another favored dish among the Turkish Roma is 'Gypsy-style' Sauteed Meat (Roman Kavurma). This dish generally includes offal such as liver, heart, and kidney, which are sautéed with onions and a variety of spices. 'Gypsy Soup' (Roman Çorbası) is also a well-liked soup within the Turkish Romani community. This soup incorporates a range of ingredients, such as lentils, chickpeas, and vegetables, which are simmered together to produce a rich and flavorful broth.

== Legal status ==
In modern Turkey, Muslim Romani do not have the legal status of an ethnic minority because they are traditionally adherents of the Islamic faith, adherents of which, regardless of ethnicity or race, are considered part of the ethnic majority in Turkey. This goes as far back as the Treaty of Lausanne (1923), in which Section III "Protection of Minorities" puts an emphasis on non-Muslim minorities.

== In popular culture ==
A Turkish Romani settlement outside Istanbul appears in the 1957 James Bond novel From Russia with Love, and its 1963 film adaptation.

A group of Turkish Romani appears in the 16th century Ottoman Constantinople of the video game Assassin's Creed: Revelations.

A Turkish TV series made between 2004 and 2007 called Cennet Mahallesi is based on Istanbulite Romans.

== Sufism ==
Many Turkish Roma, are members of the Hindiler Tekkesi, a Qadiriyya-tariqa, founded in 1738 by the Indian Muslim Sheykh Seyfullah Efendi El Hindi in Selamsız.

== Groups of Turkish Romanlar ==
=== Yerli and Çerge generic term ===
The majority of the Romani people in Turkey live in Eastern Thrace, mostly in the Kırklareli Province, they are divided into two main groups, the sedentary Yerli and the semi-nomadic Çerge. There are several subgroups of both, named after their old professions which they once practiced or which they still do in part, as example: the Sepetçiler (Basketmaker's), Çiçekçi (Flower seller), Cambazı (Horse trader), Ayıcılar (Bear-leader's), Demirci (Blacksmith), Çiçekçi (Flower seller), Sünnetçi (Circumciser), Subaşı (Water carrier), Kuyumcu (Goldsmith), Kalaycı (Tinsmith), Şarkıcı (Singer), Müzisyen (Musician), Elekçiler (Sieve maker's), Bohçacı (Bundler), Arabacı (Coachman), Katırcıları (Muleteer's), etc. However, mostly all of the different Romani groups today are Working poor in a wide variety of jobs. The Yerli and the Çerge, live together in the Mahalla, but they don't like each other. The Yerli speak only Turkish as their mother tongue, while the Çerge speak Turkish and Rumelian Romani. Although both groups are Muslims, the Yerli look down on the Çerge, and consider them savage, uncivilized and keep their distance from them. Interestingly, the Yerli call themselves Romanlar, while they call the Çerge Çingeneler. The Yerli consider the Çerge to have once come from the Balkans to Eastern Thrace.

=== Sepetçi subgroup ===
Since Ottoman Empire, the Muslim basket weavers Romanlar were very respected alongside Roma musicians. Because those Romani people, who became Muslims after the conquest of Istanbul at 1453, set up the mehter band of the Ottoman military band and the best and richest basket makers of Istanbul came from Sulukule. The Basketmakers' Kiosk was also built in their honor, where the basket makers guild was based. In East Thrace, the European part of turkey, in the Kırklareli Province, they are the Sepetçi Romanlar (Basket-weaver Roma), who are still doing their old job today and The Sepetçi Association was established in the Vize district of Kırklareli. Also in In Keşan, a special cooperative was established by Sepetçi women. At Evreşe in Gelibolu they are a Group of Sepečides whose Nomad Ancestor's once came from Thessaloniki/Selanik in Greece, still weave Baskets. In other parts in Turkey, live descendants of the Sepečides, especially in İzmir, who once came from Thessaloniki/Selanik in Greece in 1923, some of them still speak Sepečides Romani but the majority speak Turkish.

=== Ayjides subgroup ===
The Ayjides or Ayıcı are former bear-leaders who held tame bears until the 1990s.

== Romani heritage ==
Through the World Romani Congress and contact with other Romani groups of different countries, the interest in their own Romani heritage and language was awakened among the Romanlar in Turkey. Only a few Romanlar in East Thrace use Sedentary Rumelian Romani dialect at Home together, also the Sepečides Romani language in İzmir are nearly lost.

== Gallery ==
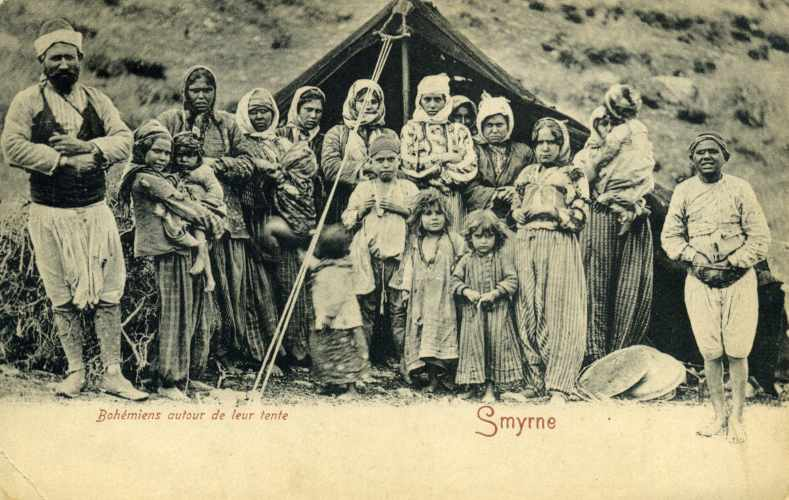
Postcard of a Muslim Romani Men with his 8 Wives and 10 Children, in front of their tent in Smyrna (today İzmir) in 1903

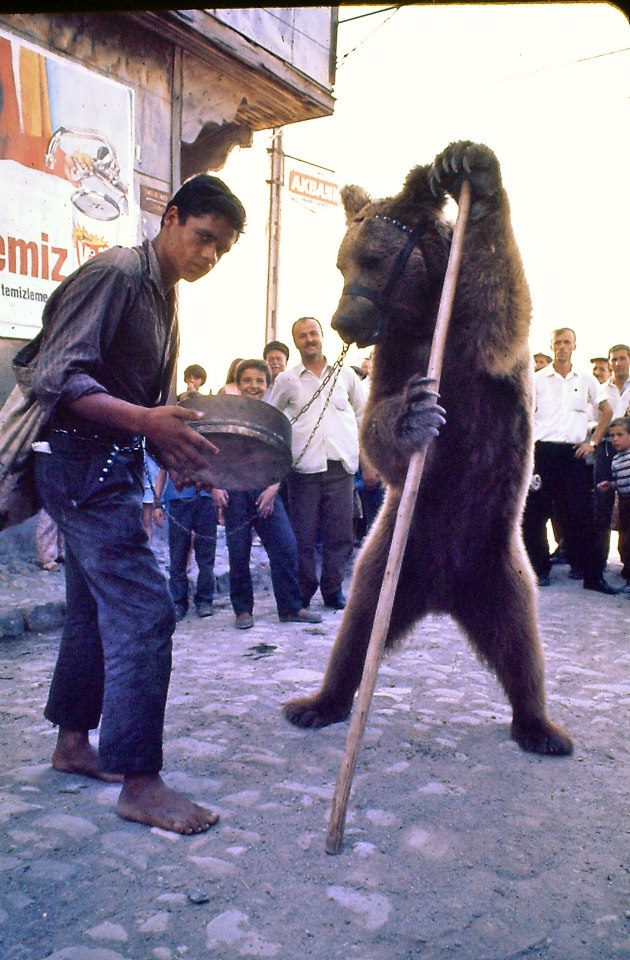
A dancing bear around 1970 in Samsun. His holder beats the frame drum Def.

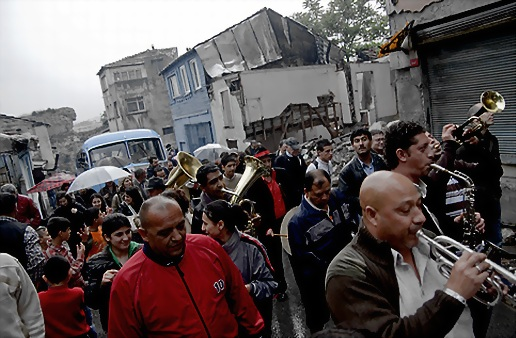
Romani in Istanbul in 2008

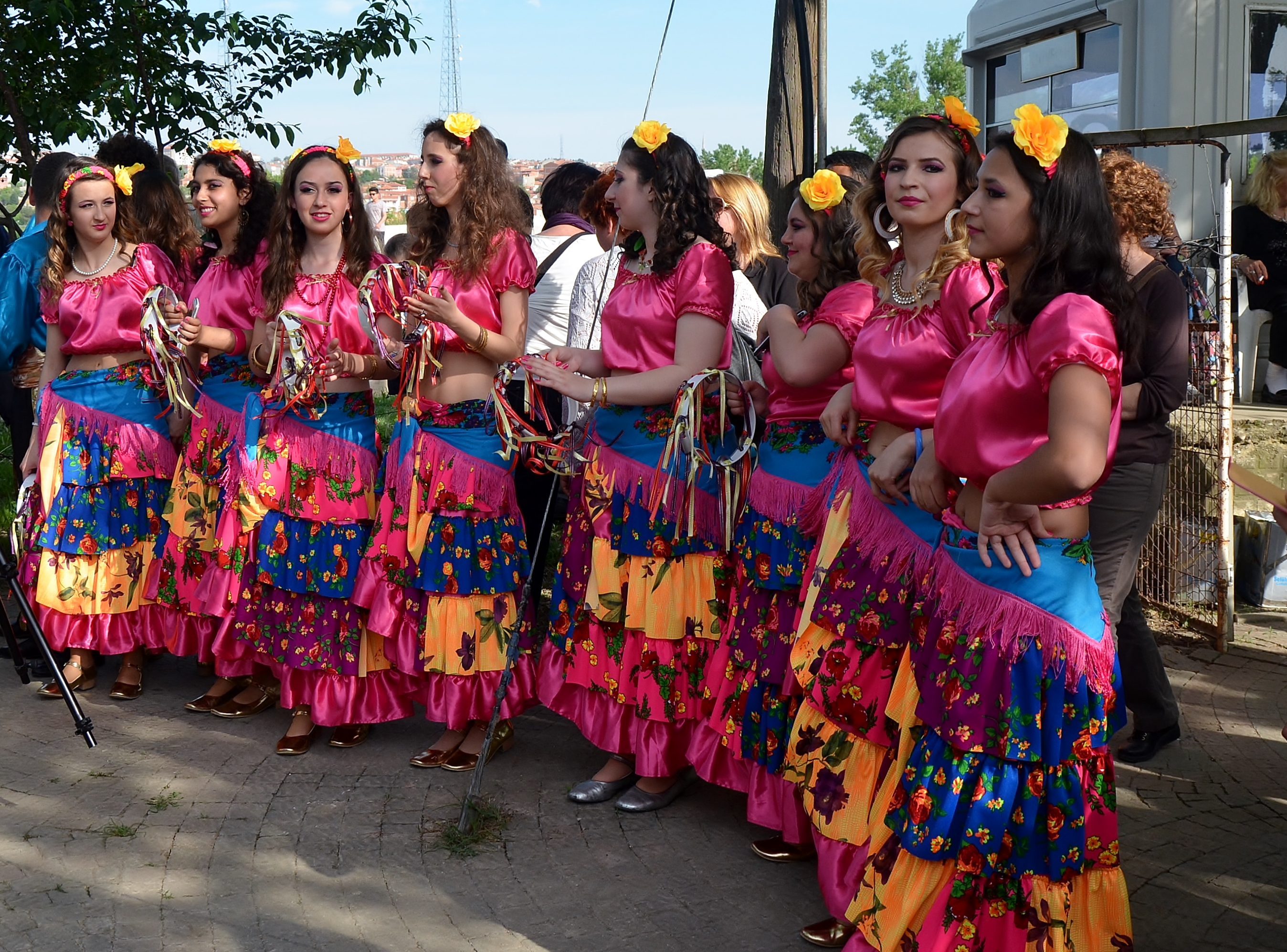
Kakava celebration at Edirne in 2015

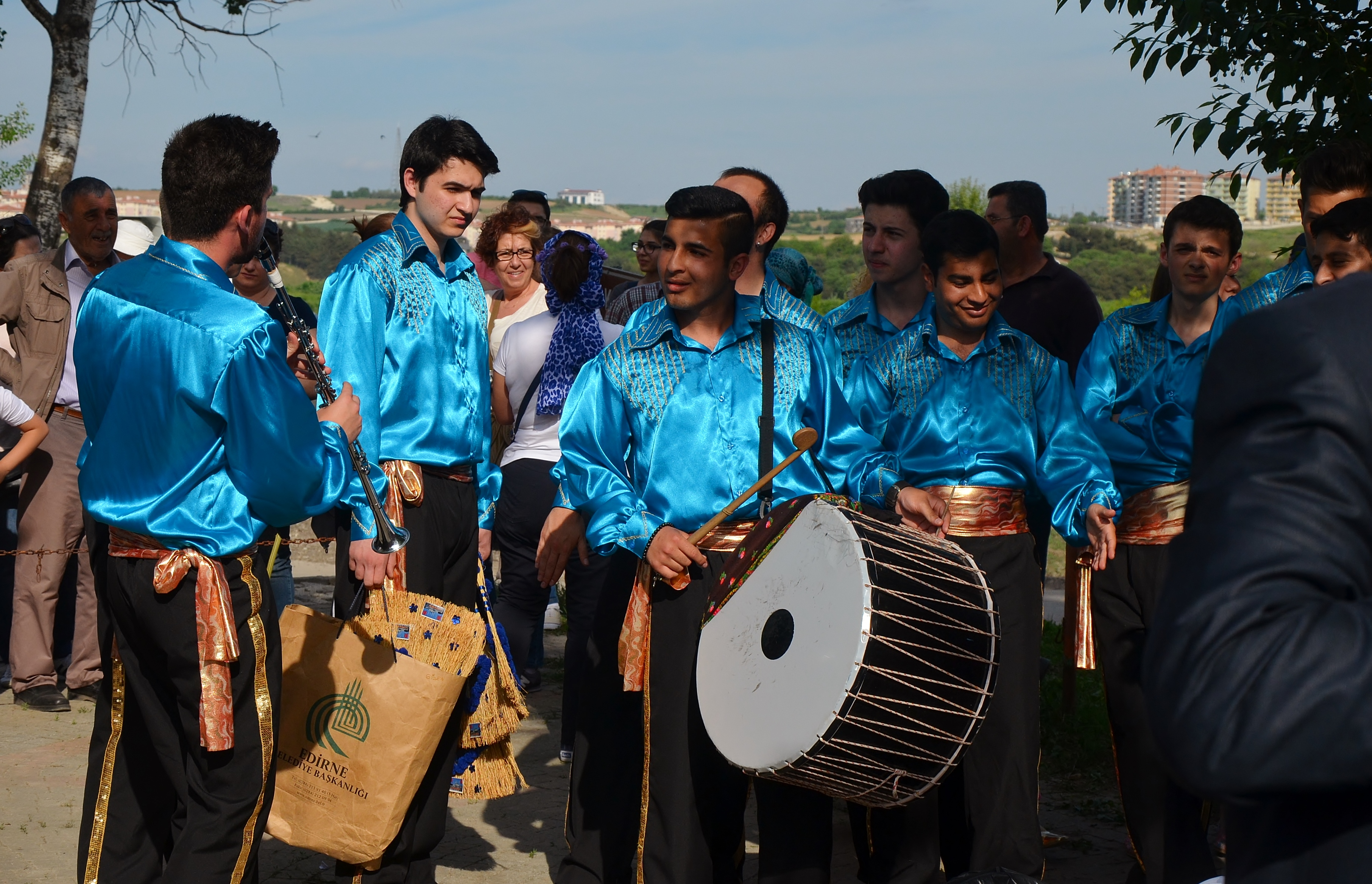
Romani men of Turkey

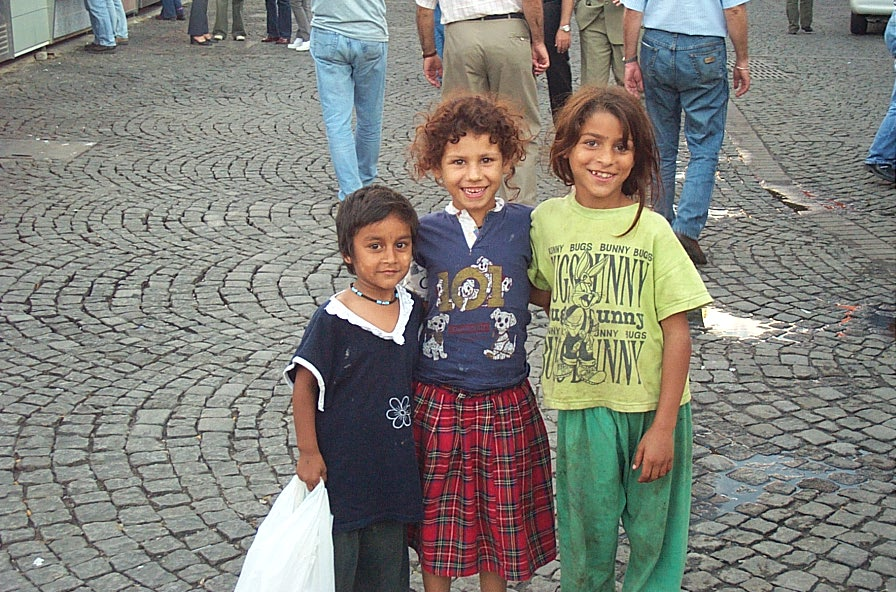
Children in Ortaköy in Istanbul, 2000

== Notable Turkish people of Romani heritage ==
- Mustafa Kandıralı (1930 – 2020), clarinetist
- Selim Sesler (1957 – 2014), clarinet virtuoso
- Kibariye (b. 1960), Arabesque-pop singer
- Ankaralı Turgut (1963 – 2024), musician
- Rafet el Roman (b. 1968), singer
- Sibel Can (b. 1970), singer and actress
- Hüsnü Şenlendirici (b. 1976), musician
- Özcan Purçu (b. 1977), politician
- Cemal Bekle (b. 1978), politician
- Didem (b. 1986), belly dancer, model and singer

== See also ==
- Minorities in Turkey
- Abdal of Turkey
- Muslim Roma
- Turkish Roma
