= ASPIDA =

ASPIDA can refer to:

- a group within the Greek Armed Forces in the early 1960s, involved in the ASPIDA scandal
- the Independent Rally of Citizens with Special Self-Identification, a Romani political party in Greece
