= Özcan Purçu =

Turkish politician

Member of the Grand National Assembly
- In office 7 June 2015 – 14 May 2023
- Constituency: İzmir (I) (June 2015, Nov 2015, 2018)

Personal details
- Born: May 6, 1977 (age 48) Söke, Aydın Province, Turkey
- Party: Republican People's Party (CHP)
- Spouse: Gülseren Göl
- Children: 2
- Education: Public administration
- Alma mater: Uludağ University
- Occupation: Politician

Özcan Purçu (born 6 May 1977) is a Turkish politician of Romani origin. He is the first ever member of the parliament of Romani heritage in Turkey, elected in 2015.

== Private life ==
Özcan Purçu was born at Söke, Aydın Province, where his parents of Romani heritage migrated in the 1950s from Çanakkale. He was one of three siblings in the family. He was born and raised in a plastic tent, which was as big as to hold two beds only, and needed to be replaced every three months because torn down. The toilet and the bathroom were outside the tent erected in a Romani neighborhood. Running water had to be supplied from the nearby mosque's fountain. He wove straw baskets to support his family financially while his mother peddled clothes and his father sold baskets.

Purçu is married to Gülseren Göl. They have two children, a son and a baby daughter.

== Education ==
With no electricity in the tent, he studied under candle light and street lamp. His parents were not literate, and his father did not want him to get educated rather than he ought to earn money contrary to Özcan's ideal. His father tried to marry off him with a young girl from the neighboring tent. As he rejected to get married, his father beat him, and burned his books and shoes. Özcan was forced to walk to the school in his mother's slippers. He completed his secondary education as the school's best pupil and with honors.

He wanted to become a kaymakam, district governor in Turkey as a public administrator, because, as he told, every Romani had to apply to the district governor's office, which he believed was the zenith of the state. He studied public administration at Uludağ University in Bursa and received an undergraduate degree. However, he could not realize his dream as a civil servant. Although successful at the exams for a career at the Military Supreme Administrative Court, he was found not suitable for the position due to his ethnicity.

== Politician career ==
After he realized that he was hindered in a state service career, he devoted himself to helping Romani citizens through non-governmental organizations (NGO), and formed the Aegean Roma Assistance Foundation.

Due to his knowledge in Romani language and English, Özcan Purçu was invited to become a representative of Turkish Romani people in the European Council's Romanis and Nomads Forum. During his first meeting in Strasbourg, he realized to his big surprise that all Romani people speak the same language wherever they come from.

In 2001, he stepped into politics as a member of the Republican People's Party (CHP). Following the start-up of an initiative for Romani people, he decided to run for a seat in the parliament at the 2011 general election. In 2009, Kemal Kılıçdaroğlu, leader of the CHP, made him an offer to join the campaign for general elections. Standing at the 11th position for his party's list of candidates in Izmir Province, he failed to get elected.

For the June 2015 general election, his rank rose to 5th in the CHP's candidate list for deputies in Izmir Province. where around 400,000 Romani people are living without being represented not even at the regional level. Following his official nomination by the party, he declared that in case of her election into the parliament, he would be representing poor and oppressed people but mainly around six million Romani people living in Turkey. He will be in charge of addressing Romani people's housing, education, and employment issues there.

At the general election on June 7, 2015, he won a seat in the parliament as a deputy of İzmir Province. He became the first ever Turkish politician of Romani heritage to enter the parliament, a historical milestone in Turkish politics. He is also known as the third Romani politician in a European country's parliament.
