= Vassilis Saleas =

Vassilis Saleas Βασίλης Σαλέας
- Born: Βασίλης Παναγιωτόπουλος; 11 December 1958 (age 67); Missolonghi, Greece
- Other name: Vassilis Saleas
- Occupation: Musician
- Years active: 1970–present
- Children: 1
- Musical career
- Origin: Greece
- Genres: Laïko; pop; folk
- Instrument: Clarinet
- Label: Minos (1976–1980)

Vasilis Saleas (Greek: Βασίλης Σαλέας) is a clarinetist from Greece with Romani descent.

A former accompanist for Dionisis Savopoulos, Saleas has worked with Vangelis since the early 1990s. His debut solo album, Orama: The Music of Vangelis, featured interpretations of Vangelis' compositions.

== Biography ==
Saleas is of Gypsy origin and he was born in Mesolongi in 1958. A year after, he moved to Athens. He was taught to play the clarinet at the age of nine having his father as his teacher and he performed his first club concert two years later. By the age of 14 he had mastered the clarinet and recorded his first disc.

== Discography ==
- Choreyte Me Ton (1980)
- I Pnoi Tou Ouranou (1992)
- Orama: Vassilis Saleas Plays Vangelis (1996)
- Litany (1997)
- Isimeria (1999)
- Fasma (2001)
- Mediterranean (2002)
- Chrysalis: Vassilis Saleas Plays Mimis Plessas (2004)
- Olon: Vassilis Saleas Meets The Great Composers [Compilation] (2007)

== See also ==
- Greek folk music
