= Turk (term for Muslims) =

Label applied to Balkan Muslims

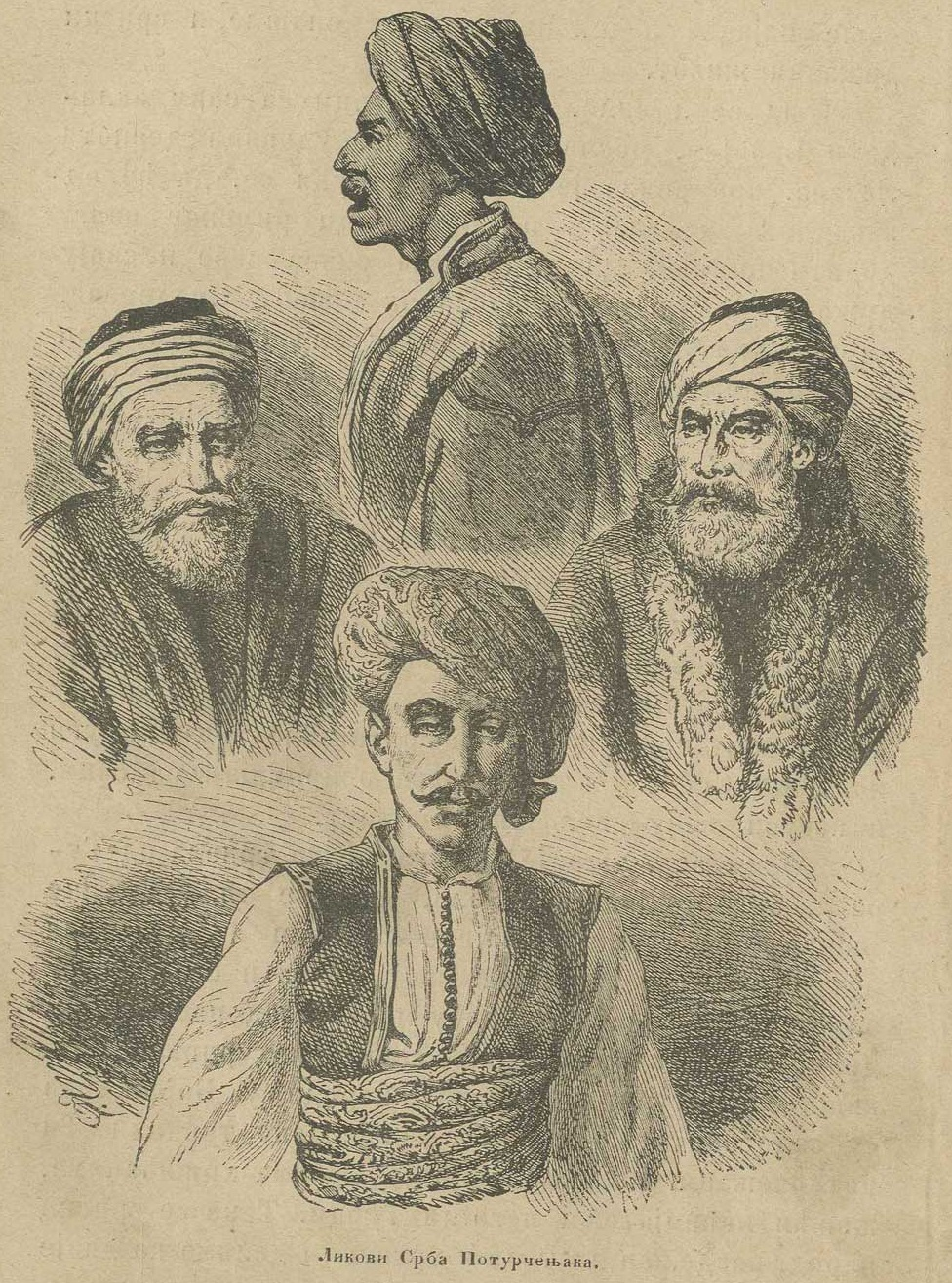
"Serb Turkified figures", 1885 illustration.

The ethnonym Turks was used as a synonym for some non-Turk Muslims in the Ottoman Empire. It was commonly used by the non-Muslim European and Balkan peoples to denote almost all Muslim people in the region, regardless of their ethnic background, stemming from the Ottoman Empire. Islam was the official state religion, with Muslims holding higher rights than non-Muslims. As such many non-Turk people converted to Islam for practical reasons during Ottoman rule and became a Turk. Apart from the ethnonym "Turks", the derivative Poturica ("Turkified") was used (maybe as a deragotary term) in South Slavic languages.

== Terminology ==
The ethnonym Turks was used in the languages of the Balkans (Greek: Τούρκοι/Tourkoi, Serbo-Croatian: Turci/Турци, Bulgarian: турци, Macedonian: турци, Albanian: Turqit) to denote the Muslim population. While the Ottoman Empire included various Muslim minorities, most of the Muslims in the Ottoman Empire, however, were indeed ethnic Turks. In the Balkans, the Muslim rayah was called "Turks" by local Muslims and non-Muslims, and this term was most commonly used for all Muslims in the Balkans, except Romani and some times Albanians. Another related term was potur (pl. poturi), in use since the 16th century, denoting conversion to Islam. In the South Slavic languages, poturiti and poturčiti means "to Turkify" and poturica "Turkified". Uskufi Bosnevi mentioned in his Ottoman-Slavic dictionary (1631/32): "The village is called selō, and the peasant pōtūr" (Köye selō, köylüye dendi pōtūr). The Bosnian Franciscan Ivan Franjo Jukić wrote "beys and other Turkish notables call [Muslim peasants] poturica and ćosa, while Catholics call them balija", referring to the Muslim rayah (commoners). For the Balkan Christians, converting to Islam meant losing one's identity and becoming a Turk, the term being a synonym of "Muslim". Ottoman official state documents from the 16th- to 19th century use the distinction Müslimān ("Muslim") and Kefer ("infidel"), while since the 18th century the term rayah was also used to denote Christians, despite its general meaning of "tax-paying lower class".

In the Ottoman Empire, Islam was the official state religion, with Muslims holding all rights, as opposed to non-Muslims who paid extra taxes, had restrictions and inferior status. In the Middle Ages, the Ottoman Turks identified as Muslim rather than Turk. The term "Turk" came to be used as a synonym for Muslims, and thereby creating two basic in-and-out groups, "Turks" and "Christians". The non-Muslim (dhimmi) ethno-religious legal groups were identified by different millets ("nations"). Ottoman Muslims became the Turkish nation and ethnicity. In modern Turkey, all Muslims, regardless of ethnicity or language, are viewed of as Turks, while non-Muslims are not, even if they speak Turkish and are Turkish citizens. A similar distinction is made within some Christian Romani communities, where Muslim Roma are called Xoraxane ("those of the Koran").

== Modern usage ==
In the modern age, the term has been used with negative connotations, such as in European works to denote "the enemy of Christendom". Today, the term is still found as a pejorative for Muslims.

In Greece and in the Greek language, the same belief was held about Greek Muslims that they had essentially "become Turks", and tourkalvanoi ("Turco-Albanians") became a common term in the 19th century for Muslim Albanians who had been a significant minority in the country.

The islamologist Michael Sells identifies Christoslavism, the "belief that Slavs are Christians by nature and that any conversion from Christianity is a betrayal of the Slavic race" in the 19th-century Mountain Wreath of Montenegrin bishop Njegoš, and connects it also to the Croat and Serb nationalist usage of "Turks" for Slavic Muslims.

In 1990, Bosnian Islamic philosopher Alija Izetbegović, the author of Islamic Declaration (1970), founded the Party of Democratic Action and was interviewed and asked about national identity in SR Bosnia and Herzegovina, saying "A dilemma of belonging on this soil never existed among Muslims. Nor during Turkish rule of these areas. Muslims did not feel as Turks" (Serbo-Croatian: Dilema pripadnosti ovom tlu nije nikada postojala kod Muslimana. Čak ni za vladavine Turske ovim krajevima. Muslimani se nisu osjećali Turcima). During the Yugoslav wars, the term was used in the Bosnian Serb assembly to construct the Bosnian Muslims as an enemy. After the takeover of Srebrenica in 1995, Bosnian Serb general Ratko Mladić said "I congratulate you on the liberation of Srebrenica, which has been important for the Serbian people since the rebellion against Dahias, when Turks from Srebrenica killed Serbs in Mačva".

== See also ==
- Giaour
- Ottoman wars in Europe
- Turkoman (ethnonym)

== Sources ==
- Cagaptay, Soner (2014). "Beyond Ottoman Benevolence". The Rise of Turkey: The Twenty-First Century's First Muslim Power. Potomac Books, Inc. pp. 70–. ISBN 978-1-61234-650-2.
- Fotić, Aleksandar (2017). "Tracing the origin of a new meaning of the term re'āyā in the eighteenth-century Ottoman Balkans". Balcanica (48). National Library of Serbia: 55–66. doi:10.2298/balc1748055f. ISSN 0350-7653.
- Ion, Josan (2014). "Becoming a Turk: Turkishness between the Empire and the Nation-State". In Biagini, Antonello; Motta, Giovanni (eds.). Empires and Nations from the Eighteenth to the Twentieth Century: Volume 1. Cambridge Scholars Publishing. pp. 57–64. ISBN 978-1-4438-6193-9.
- Mentzel, Peter (2000). "Introduction: Identity, confessionalism, and nationalism". Nationalities Papers. 28 (1): 8. doi:10.1080/00905990050002425. S2CID 145649273.
- Zemon, Rubin (2014). "From "Millet" to "Nations" and/or "Minorities"". In Biagini, Antonello; Motta, Giovanni (eds.). Empires and Nations from the Eighteenth to the Twentieth Century: Volume 1. Cambridge Scholars Publishing. pp. 141–150. ISBN 978-1-4438-6193-9.
