= Xoraxane =

Term for Turkified or Muslim Romani people

Xoraxane (also spelled as Khorakhane, Khorakhanè, Horahane, Kharokane, Xoraxai) is a Romani term used to refer to Turkified or Muslim Romani people. The origin of the term is uncertain, although linguist Yaron Matras proposes an etymological link with the medieval Turkic Kara-Khanid Khanate. Although historically and most densely concentrated within the Balkans, they are present across Europe, and in smaller numbers within the Americas.

The majority of Xoroxane in the former Yugoslavia speak Balkan Romani and South Slavic languages, while many speak only the language from the host countries. Turkish Roma, or Türk Çingeneler, speak the Turkish language, have fully adopted Turkish culture, and often identify exclusively as Turks. The Xoraxane in Bulgaria, commonly known as Turski Cigani, often speak Turkish, Romani, or Romani heavily mixed with Turkish, as their primary language. Following the fall of communism in Bulgaria in 1989, there was a surge in Xoroxane identifying as Christian in Bulgaria, followed by a significant decline between 1995 and 2007. The Albanized Xoroxane groups in Albania and Kosovo speak only the Albanian language and are called Khorakhan Shiptari.

Muslim Xoroxane are often cultural or nominal Muslims. Their religious identity is generally associated with the Ottoman period in the Balkans, or the Sultanate of Rûm in Anatolia. While traditionally affiliated with Sunni Islam of the Hanafi school of thought, today, they are often non-denominational. One of the largest religious orders of Jerrahi outside Turkey is located at the largest Arlije and Gurbeti Muslim Romani settlement in Europe, in Šuto Orizari (Shutka), North Macedonia. They have their own mosque and Romani Imam and use the Quran in the Romani language.

== Diaspora in the Americas ==
=== United States ===
The first Xoraxane came to the United States from Yugoslavia (from what is now North Macedonia) around 1960s and settled in the Bronx, where they built a mosque. They typically have minimal ties with other Romani people in America. Later, during the Balkan war in the 1990s, a group of Xoroxane came from Bosnia and Herzegovina and settled in St. Louis, Missouri.

=== Chile ===
A small group of Xoraxane came from Serbia and Bosnia and Herzegovina around the 19th century and settled in Chile. They may have identified with Eastern Orthodoxy or Islam prior to their arrival in Chile, where they, at least culturally or nominally, converted to Catholicism. Some still practice the Serbian-Orthodox tradition of celebrating the slava (patron saint) with rračía (brandy). Some still practice Qurban (Islamic ritual animal sacrifice), which they call Kurbano.
