= Hıdırellez =

Turkish name for spring festival

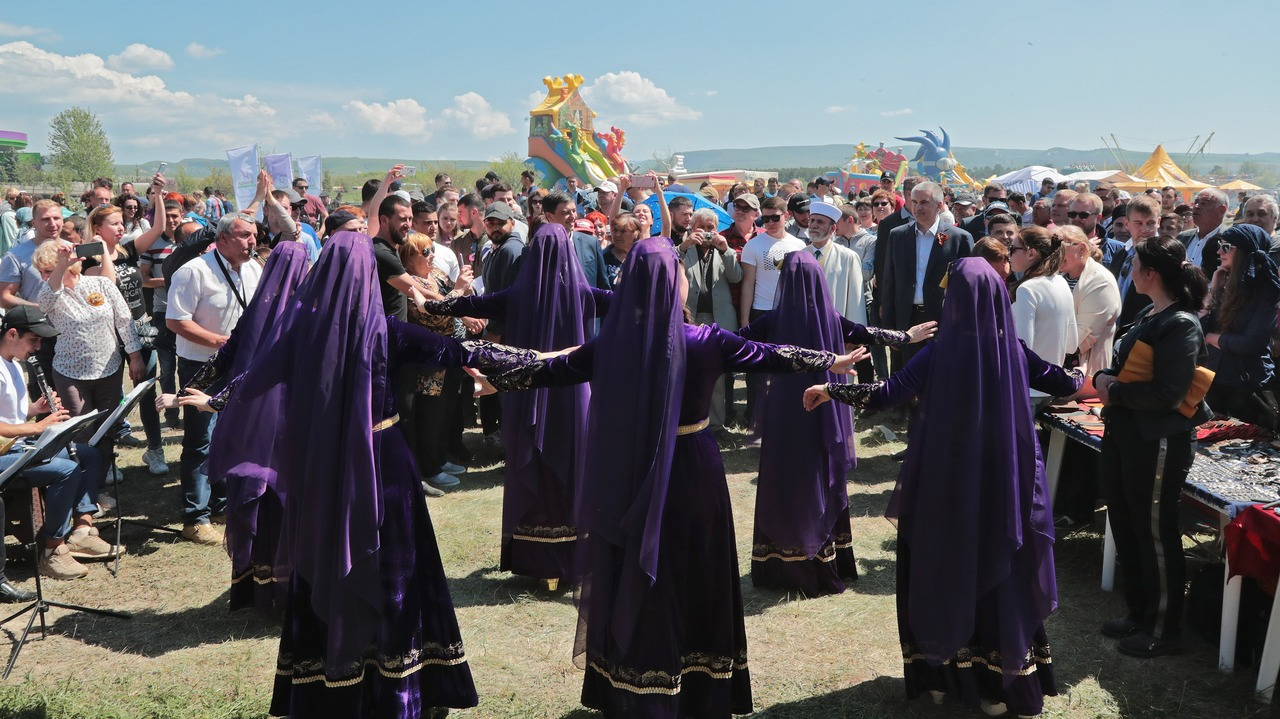
- Hıdırellez in Crimea, 2019
- Observed by: Balkans, Turkey
- Type: International
- Significance: Prophets Hızır and Ilyas
- Date: May 5–May 6
- Frequency: Annual

Spring celebration, Hıdrellez
- UNESCO Intangible Cultural Heritage
- Country: North Macedonia and Turkey
- Reference: 01284
- Region: Europe and North America

Inscription history
- Inscription: 2017 (12th session)
- List: Representative

Hıdırellez or Hıdrellez (Turkish pronunciation: [hɯd(ɯ)ɾælˈlez]; Azerbaijani: Xıdır İlyas/Nəbi; Crimean Tatar: Hıdırlez; Gagauz: Hederlez) is a folk holiday celebrated as the day on which the prophets Al-Khidr (Hızır) and Elijah (İlyas) met on Earth. Hıdırellez starts on the night of May 5 and ends on May 6 in the Gregorian calendar, and April 23 (St. George's day for the Christians) in the Julian calendar. It is observed in Turkey, Crimea, Gagauzia, Syria, Iraq, the Caucasus, and the Balkans and celebrates the arrival of spring.

Khidr (Arabic: ٱلْخَضِر, romanized: al-Khaḍir), also transcribed as al-Khadir, Khader, Khizr, al-Khidr, Khazer, Khadr, Khedher, Khizir, and Khizar, is a figure described but not mentioned by name in the Quran as a righteous servant of God possessing great wisdom or mystic knowledge. In various Islamic and non-Islamic traditions, Khidr is described as a messenger, prophet, wali, slave, or angel who guards the sea, teaches secret knowledge, and aids those in distress. As guardian angel, he prominently figures as patron of the Islamic saint Ibn Arabi. The figure of al-Khidr has been syncretized. In 2017, it was inscribed in the UNESCO Intangible Cultural Heritage Lists of North Macedonia and Turkey.

== Brief summary ==
Hıdırellez is regarded as one of the most important seasonal bayrams (festivals) in both Turkey and parts of the Middle East. Called Day of Hızır (Ruz-ı Hızır) in Turkey, Hıdırellez is celebrated as the day on which the prophets Hızır (Al-Khdir) and İlyas (Elijah) met on Earth. The words Hızır and İlyas fused to create the present term. Hıdırellez Day falls on May 6 in the Gregorian calendar and April 23 in the Julian calendar. In other countries the day has mostly been connected with pagan and Saint George cults.

== Etymology ==
The word Hıdırellez, born out as a compound form of Hızır and İlyas, they are regarded as two different persons. In respect to religious sources, there are several references on İlyas; However, there is no slight mention about Hızır. The perception of seeing Hızır and İlyas as identical arises from the fact that İlyas stands as an obscure figure within the context of Tasavvuf (Sufism) and popular piety when compared to Hızır and there are numerous legends on Hızır, whereas little is known about İlyas and furthermore, there are many great maqams of Hızır, yet there are only few maqams for İlyas. Ali the Fourth Caliph is associated with Hızır within Alevi-Bektaşi belief system.

St. George is the figure corresponding to Hızır in Christianity. Besides being associated with St. George, Hızır is also identified with İlyas Horasani, St. Theodore and St. Sergios. St. George believed by Muslims to be identical with Hızır, is also believed to be similar to some Muslim saints; St. George is identified with Torbalı Sultan and Cafer Baba in Thessaly, Karaca Ahmet Sultan in Skopje, which is a mounting evidence how St. George and Hızır have influenced St. George’s Day and Hıdrellez Day ceremonies.

== Other names ==
Other names for the celebration used in different regions of Turkey are "Hıdrellez, Hızır-ilyas, Ederlez, Tepreş, Haftamal, Eğrice", and also "Kakava" among Roma in Edirne and Kırklareli. In Azerbaijan the day is known as Xızır Nəbi bayramı, while Azerbaijani communities in Georgia simply call it Xıdr Nabe. The day is also known as "Tepreş" among Crimean Tatars who live in Northern Dobruja (Romania). Dita e Shëngjergjit (Albania), Gergyovden (Bulgaria), Djurdjevdan (Serbia) Shëngjergji, Gjurgjovden, Erdelezi, Agiu Giorgi, Hıderles (North Macedonia), Khider-Elyas (Iraq), khidr-Elyas, Mar Elyas, Mar Georgeos (Syria).

== Communities concerned ==
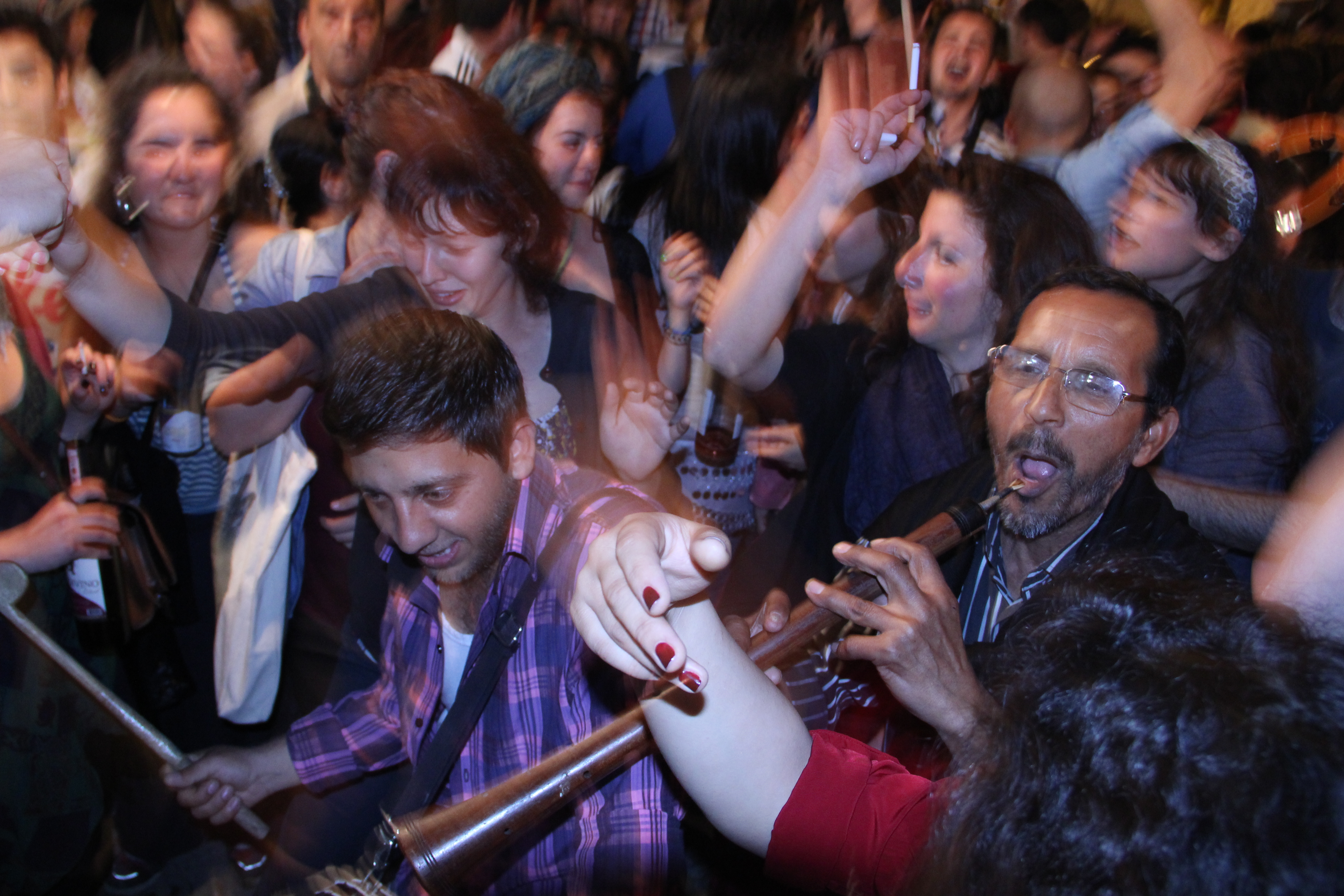
Hıdırellez celebrations

It is widely seen that various rituals celebrating the arrival of spring or summer are practiced among many Turkic tribes in Central Asia. To a certain degree, we have information about spring rituals practiced by Yakuts since ancient times. They were performing those rituals in the honor of Tengri (God of the blue sky controlling the heavenly universe). When the earth was dressed in green, they gathered under trees and sacrificed horses or oxen to honor God and then they assembled in the shape of a circle and drank kumiss (beverage of western and central Asia which is made from the fermented milk of a mare or camel -also koumiss-) together. Those celebrations took place in April. Tungusic people practiced those rituals in May and meanwhile they offered sacrifices as white mares to the earth and the sky. Mongols, Kalmyks and Buryats are known to have practiced rituals in spring and summer. Those traditions have been conserved for centuries long. It can be said that Turkish people have been quite familiar with rituals practiced in spring and summer seasons according to their belief system, cultural pattern and social life in Central Asia before immigrating to the West (Turkey and Balkans). After converting to Islam, Turks have culturally blended the aforementioned spring and summer celebrations with Hızır cult, who is widely accepted as a supernatural personality closely associated with air, plants and water. Hıdırellez doesn't have any links to Islam, rather it is a cultural practice. The immigrant Turkish peoples were introduced by seasonal celebrations which are, particularly rooted in ancient Anatolian culture, held in spring or early summer and formed under the influence of Christianity. One of those elements is the St. George’s Cult, which was widely known during the era of Christianity in Turkey. While Christianity was predominant religion in Turkey, several pagan cults of those times are attributed to the saints, yet some others are attributed to imaginary ones. Within this context, St. George cult has become influential over the formation of Hızır cult in Turkey and the Balkans. St. George ceremonies, which were celebrated on May 6–8 among Christians in Turkey, Middle East and the Balkan countries, ever since.

Hıdırellez or St. George Day is also celebrated under the name Dita Verës (Summer Day) in Albania which was originated by the pagan cult in the city of Elbasan - the so-called Zana e Çermenikës- the goddess of forest and hunting. It is celebrated on March 14 and symbolizes the end of winter and the beginning of spring and summer. At the same time, in different regions of Albania, it is celebrated among some other communities known as Dita e Shëngjergjit, St. George Day on May 6.

Hıdırellez is widely spread celebration in most Syrian territories, but mainly practiced in the rural areas. We have information about spring rituals practiced since ancient times. Those rituals are the manifestations of the celebration for the arrival of spring and summer. Further of the symbol of spring and resurrection of life that is, so called ever-green, ever-return Al-Khidr prophet. Rituals take place annually on May 6. People, Muslims and Christians, regardless of their religious affiliation, celebrate the living Alkhidr prophet that is St. George or Mar Georgeos. The cult of celebration of St. George has become influential over the formation of Eid Alkhidr in Syria as well. The two names are identical. People go to picnic to the natural places, practicing the rituals of celebration, including performing folk music, singing and dancing. In the area of Zabadani for example, people used to gather around a tree aged about 800 years as a symbol of the ever-return Alkhidr.

== Ceremonies and rituals ==
There are various theories about the origin of Hızır and Hıdırellez. Various ceremonies and rituals were performed for various gods with the arrival of spring or summer in Mesopotamia, Anatolia, Iran and other Mediterranean countries from ancient times.

One widespread belief suggests that Hızır has attained immortality by drinking the water of life. He often wanders on the earth, especially in the spring, and helps people in difficulty. People see him as a source of bounty and health, as the festival takes place in spring, the time of new life. To date, the arrival of spring or summer, figuratively meaning the rebirth of nature or the end of winter, has been celebrated with ceremonies or various rituals at every place in which mankind lives. Within the seasonal cycle, winter symbolizes death; spring symbolizes revival or regeneration of life. Thus, time for the days full of hope, health, happiness and success comes. Therefore, Hıdırellez Day is highly significant since it is believed to be the day on which Hızır and İlyas met on the earth, which is accepted as the arrival of spring/ summer.

In Turkey, it is widely believed that Hızır is the prophet who while bringing fertility to man wanders on the earth and as for the prophet İlyas, he is accepted as the water deity. In order to fulfill some of their missions, these two prophets wander around the land and the sea throughout the year and meet on May 6. This meeting stands for the fusion of the land and water.

Today, the ceremonial activities for Hıdırellez are prevalently and elaborately prepared especially in villages or towns rather than metropolises. The preparations for the celebrations are associated with the issues as cleaning the house and the garments, dress, finery and food-drink and doing shopping for the feast. The indoor of the houses and the outdoor places as gardens are supposed to be clean, because Hızır is expected to visit the houses on that day. Almost everywhere, garments and other apparels and food-beverages are common components of Hıdırellez ceremonies. All the preparations related to the ceremonies are of particular concern to the young men or women, since Hıdırellez is regarded as the most proper occasion for the youth-willing to marry in the future-to find a suitable match.

Hıdrellez ceremonies are held in the countryside near the cities, towns or villages where generally streams, lakes or other water springs exist. By great majority, there are tombs or shrines open to visits in those locations which are placed on hills. Bearing the specific features, Hıdırlıks are particularly chosen for Hıdırellez ceremonies.

As Hızır is believed to be a healer, some ritual practices as regards to health issues can be seen on Hıdırellez Day. On that day, meals cooked by lamb meat are traditionally feasted. It is believed that on Hıdırellez Day all kinds or species of the living, plants and trees revive in a new cycle of life, therefore the meat of the lambs grazing on the land which Hızır walks through is assumed as the source of health and happiness. In addition to these, some special meals besides lamb meat are cooked on that day.

The other ritual practice for seeking health and cure is the ritual of jumping over the fire which is built by old belongings or bushes. While uttering prayers and riddles, people jump over the fire at least three times. That fire is called Hıdırellez fire; hence, it is believed that all illnesses or diseases are warded off all the year long. Another ritual practice for having good health on Hıdırellez Day is to be awash or bath by water brought from some holy places.

It is believed that all the wishes and prayers come true on the eve and the very day of Hıdırellez. If one wishes to have more properties, s/he makes a small rough model of it onto the ground in the garden and Hıdırlık. Occasionally, the wishes or prayers are written on a piece of paper and thrown under the rose trees, etc.

Furthermore, within the scope of Hıdırellez ceremonies in Turkey and the countries mentioned, some practices related to seeking for good fortune and luck can be seen. One of those practices is the tradition called "mantufar, martifal etc.", which is played to have good fortune. On 5th of May, the girls or women seeking for good fortune, luck or a suitable match to marry put their rings, earrings etc. into a pot. Then, the pot is closed after pouring some water into it. Afterwards, the pot is left under a rose tree for one night and the following day, women put the pot in the middle of the crowd and take their belongings out while reciting mâni (rhyming Turkish poems).

== See also ==
- Kakava
- Đurđevdan
