= Turkish Roma =

Ethnic group

Regions with significant populations
- Bulgaria, European Turkey, North Macedonia, Greece, Kosovo, Northern Cyprus, Romania

Languages
- Turkish language

Religion
- Islam

Turkish Roma (Note: Also referred to as Turkish Gypsies, Turcoman Gypsies, Türk Çingeneler, Turski Tsigani (турски цигани), Turkogifti (τουρκο-γύφτοι), Țigani turci, Turci Cigani.) are Turkish-speaking Romani people who have adopted the Turkish identity, culture and language over the centuries. It is believed that, in many cases, they did so to elevate their social status. They are allowed to live in Turkish communities, but face discrimination. They are often cultural Muslims who adopted Sunni Islam (predominantly Hanafism) at the time of the Sultanate of Rum and the Ottoman Empire.

Their legendary leader was Mansur ibn Yakub Han, called Çingene Han. He built his Kervansaray in Malatya in 1224. Today it can still be seen as a ruin. Mansur bin Yakup Han is buried in the Ulu Mosque in Malatya.

== History ==
Hamza al-Isfahani wrote about 12,000 musicians from India who was taken by Bahram Gur to Persia, also did Ferdowsi. Evliya Çelebi told that Mehmed II take after 1453 from Balat, Muslim Roma to Istanbul, their descendants became musicians. They spoke only Turkish with very few Romani words in their jargon. They migrated from Anatolia to Marmara region and finally settled in the Balkans at the time of the Ottoman Empire.

=== Anti-Turko-Romani statement ===
The Greek Doctor A. G. Paspati made the statement in his book from 1860, that Turks married often Roma women and the Rumelian Romani dialect is nearly lost by the Muslim Turkish Roma, who speak entirely Turkish. Ernest Gilliat-Smith, explained in 1915, that this Turkish Roma in Bulgaria can not speak Romani language, and compared them with very poor Turks rather than Romani people. The French orientalist Henri Bourgeois referred to the Turkish Roma as Pseudo Roma, especially the newspaper Laço who was published in 1910 by Emin Resa.

=== Non-Turkish Roma people ===
Indeed, there are people in Edirne who are not Romani people at all but are still said to be Roma. Their story is as follows: In the Ottoman Empire, some families who saw military service as risky and did not want to send their sons as Soldiers, saw no problem to take a Roma (Coptic) identity for registration their population, because they knew that Roma were not recruited as combatants, until 1874 when equal rights with other Muslims was given for Muslim Roma. These families still continued to appear as Roma in the records. In the past, there were also classified groups of Turks as "Roma" or "Tatars" in Bulgaria.

== Settlements and migration ==
The majority of Turkish Roma live in Turkey, but also significant Turkish Roma communities live in Bulgaria, North Macedonia, Greece (Western Thrace, Northern Cyprus, in lesser case Romania (Dobruja) and Kosovo. In East Thrace -Turkey, they are called Şopar. The meaning of the name comes from the Rumelian Romani and has different meanings.

A small Turkish Roma community live in Dobruja in Romania. They are the descendants of Muslim Roma who intermingled with Turks at the time of Ottoman Empire Romanian Christian Roma Groups regard them simply as "Turks" and are distinct for them.

In Western Thrace, Greece, in cities like Alexandroupoli (Dedeağaç), Komotini (Gümülcine) and Xanthi (İskeçe) Muslim Roma called Turko-Roma, i.e. such as Sepečides or Sevljara and Kalpazaja who are Turkish speaking.

In Northern Cyprus there are Turkish speaking Roma, who are very close to them in Turkey and West Thrace in Greece.

In Kosovo lives a Turkish Roma community named Divanjoldjije. They are named after there original settlement where they once came from, the Divanyolu Street in Istanbul, and settled in Pristina at the time of the Ottoman Kosovo.

Romanlar in Turkey came to Germany and Austria and other European Countries as Gastarbeiter but they are fully assimilated within the Turks in Europe.

In North Macedonia, in the cities of Skopje, Kočani, Štip, and Veles, North Macedonia, there live Turkish Gypsies. They do not live in Roma quarters but together with the host population. Several families emigrated to Turkey in 1953–1968. They and there descendants are accepted fully as Turks.

Since Bulgaria became Member in the European Union, Turkish Roma from Bulgaria went to West Europe as Workers. Data on the self-Identification of Bulgarian Muslim Roma Youth in Berlin shows they identify as Turkish 97%, while only 3% to be Romani.

At the Greek War of Independence, Russo-Turkish War (1877–1878) and Balkan Wars (1912–1913), Muslim Roma flee together with other different Muslim Groups to Istanbul and East Thrace, as Muhacir.

At the population exchange between Greece and Turkey, Muslim Turkish Roma from Greece have also been resettled in Turkey. In Turkish, they are called Mübadil Romanlar.

According to the 1925 Convention, between Bulgaria and Turkey, Muslims allowed to leave Bulgaria. A special characteristic example of this are the Turkish Roma of the Veliko Tarnovo district, who entered in the Bulgarian registers by nationality, "Turks" emigrated to Turkey. In 1950–1951 Muslim Turkish Roma from Bulgaria came to Turkey and settled in Çanakkale and surroundings.

From 1953 -1968, Turkish Roma from Yugoslavia emigrated to Turkey.

The Xoraxaya, (X as ch in German Achtung), or Muslim Roma from Turkey and southeastern Europe, also came to the USA, where they founded mainly Turkish Roma dance (Roman Havasi) clubs, also they named Turkish Romany.

== Subgroups ==
Turkish-speaking Roma are named mostly after professions which they do or has been made by their ancestors, like Sepečides.

== Genetics ==
The following Y-Dna haplogroups were found in Turkey, while 26.5% indicates the Haplogroup M (mtDNA). The few % of Y-DNA L and H indicate Proto Romani paternal line because the other Y-DNA are all also found in Non-Roma Men. Since there was a mixture of peoples from different backgrounds in the Ottoman Empire.

- I2a (20%)
- J2a (18.4%)
- R2a (17.1%)
- O3-M122 (15.6%)
- R1b (14.9%)
- E1b (14.3%)
- R1a (12.1%)
- C-RPS4Y (8.5%)
- L-M20 (4,21%)
- H-M82 (0,57%)

== Turkish Romani cuisine ==
'Romani cuisine' in Turkey is an important proof that Turkish Roma have lived in Anatolia since ancient times, the culinary culture of the Turkish Roma has seriously affected the rich cuisine of Anatolia.

== Music and Dance ==
Their Turkish music (style) is known for its special 9/8 rhythm and Belly dance performance.

== Culture ==
In Turkey, the festival of Kakava is hold in Edirne and the belief in a savior named Baba fingo are part of the Romani culture. Turkish Roma usually marry at a young age, boys usually between 15 and 19 years old and girls between 13 and 17 years old. Polygamy is also widespread. It is not uncommon for a man to have up to 7-11 wives. The morality of the behavior deps on the social standing of the partner, not gender per se. Both women and young men are considered normal objects of desire, but outside marriage a man was supposed to act on his desires with only non-Romani woman. Boys are circumcised between the ages of 3-7, and a festival called bijav sunet is held. A so-called kirvo (godfather) is also very important. The kirvo is the person who will support the boy during the circumcision ceremony.

== Religion ==
In the Western Balkans, a unique so-called Romani Islam has developed over time. In Turkey at Üsküdar an own Romani Sufi Order was established, the so called Gulsheni Sezai order.

In Bulgaria since the 1990, through evangelical Christian missionaries, a few Turkish Roma have become evangelical Christians.

== See also ==
- Romani people in Turkey
