= Muslim Romani people =

Ethnic Romani people of Muslim religious affiliation

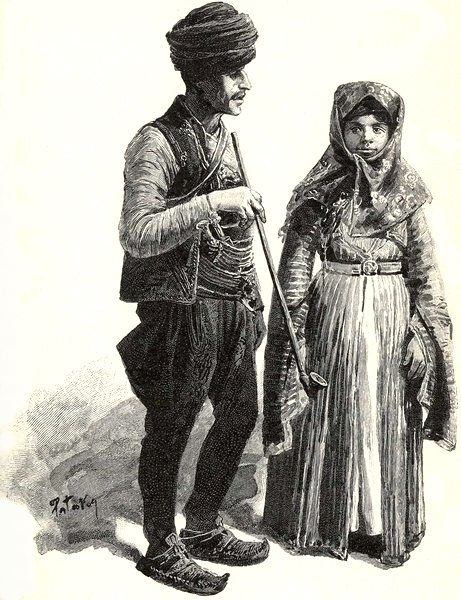
Muslim Romani in Bosnia (around 1900)

Muslim Romani people are Romani people who profess Islam. They primarily live in the Balkans, though they are dispersed across Europe. Significant minority communities can be found in Albania, Bosnia and Herzegovina, Bulgaria, Kosovo, Montenegro and North Macedonia. They are also notably present in Crimea, Croatia (where 45% of the country's Romani population is Muslim), Romania, Serbia and Slovenia.

Generally, Islam among Romani people is historically associated with their time spent within the Ottoman Empire, and, to a lesser degree, the Sultanate of Rum.

The majority of Muslim Romanies in the former Yugoslavia speak Balkan Romani and South Slavic languages, while many speak only the language from the host country's like the Albanized Muslim Roma in Albania, Kosovo, Montenegro and North Macedonia, known as Khorakhan Shiptari. They speak only the Albanian language and have fully adopted the Albanian culture. In Šuto Orizari (Shutka), North Macedonia, they have their own mosque and Romani Imam and use the Quran in the Romani language. Turkish Roma are those who fully adopted the Turkish language and culture, although a few also speak the Kurbetcha, Rumelian or Sepečides dialects of Romani. Others are thought to have adopted the Askhali and Balkan Egyptian ethnicities.

== Ottoman/Turkish influence ==
Muslim Romani people are generally Turkified.

Under Ottoman Rule, the Christian and Muslim Roma were separated, by the order of Suleiman the Magnificent. Muslim Romani men served in the Military of the Ottoman Empire, especially in the Ottoman military band. Muslim Roma were forbidden to marry Christian Roma or live together, and differences emerged between Muslim and Christian Roma.

Today, some Orthodox Christian Vlax Romani see themself as the čáče Roma (true Roma) and do not consider Muslim Roma to be part of Romani society and call them Turks. Some Muslim Roma, however, see Christian Roma as foreign and call them Dasikane (Servant, slaves). Also the phrase Amare Roma (Our Roma) and Cudza Roma (foreign Roma) is used vice versa. There is a considerable cultural gap between the two religious groups.

Although Muslim Roma paid a jizya in the first centuries of the Ottoman Empire, an exception were the Muslim Roma in Ottoman Bosnia and Herzegovina, who were exempt from taxes by the order of Selim II. After the Edict of Gülhane, all Muslim Roma became exempt from paying the taxes to the Ottoman Empire and became fully accepted Muslims. In 1874, the Ottoman Empire gave equal rights to other Muslims.

After the collapse of the Ottoman Empire, the Muslim Roma have found themselves under double discrimination in regions where Islam was a minority religion, experiencing both Antiziganism and anti-Muslim sentiment.

At the Greek War of Independence, Russo-Turkish War (1877–1878) and Balkan Wars (1912–1913), Muslim Roma flee together with other different Muslim Groups to Istanbul and East Thrace, as Muhacir.

At the Population exchange between Greece and Turkey, Muslim Turkish Roma from Greece have also been resettled in Turkey. In Turkish, they are called Mübadil Romanlar.

In 1950–1951 Muslim Turkish Roma from Bulgaria came to Turkey and settled in Çanakkale and surroundings.

From 1953 -1968, Muslim Turkish Roma and Turks from Yugoslavia emigrated to Turkey.

Turkish Roma from Turkey and also other Muslim Roma from ex-Yugoslavia, came to Western Europe as Gastarbeiter, but seen by the Host population as Turks or Yugoslavs. Muslim Roma from Bosnia and Kosovo went at the time of the Yugoslav Wars to Italy, and live especially in Florence. Xoraxane from former Yugoslavia went to USA, settled mostly in New York, and South America. Since 2007, Turkish Roma from Bulgaria went as workers to West Europe.

== Faith and status ==
While traditionally affiliated with Sunni Islam of the Hanafi school of thought, today, they are often non-denominational. One of the largest religious orders of Jerrahi outside Turkey is located at the largest Arlije and Gurbeti Muslim Roma settlement in Šuto Orizari (Shutka), North Macedonia. Romani people in Turkey are mostly Sunni. Under Ottoman rule, Romani Muslims had a lower social status than non-Romani Muslims, but above that of non-Muslims. In North Macedonia, at Shutka, the first Romani mosque was built, but at the same time, radicalization towards a strict form of Islam is increasing there by the Roma population, as is the case in Bulgaria.

== Xoroxane ==
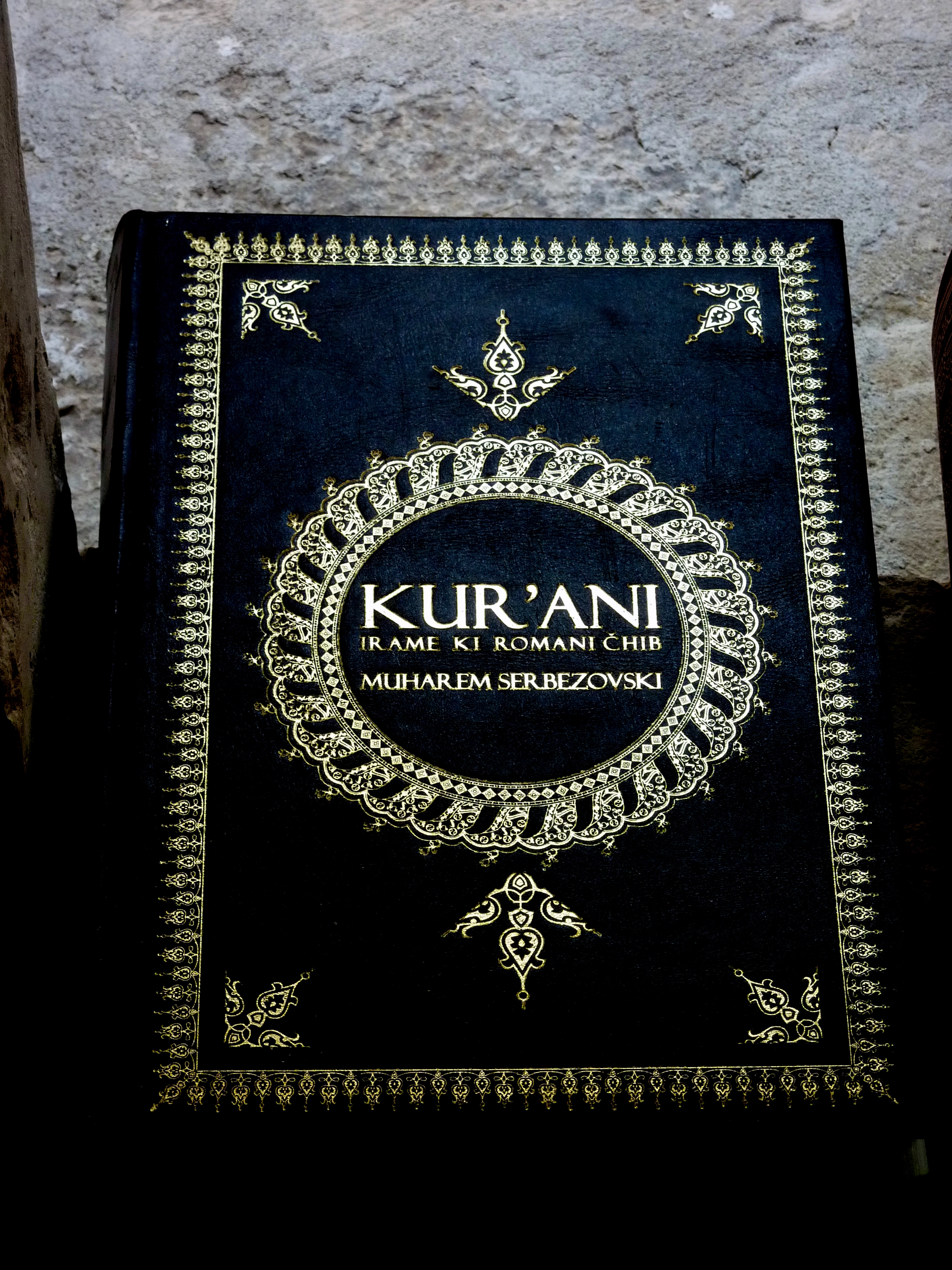
A Romani translation of the Quran

Xoraxane (also spelled as Khorakhane, Xoraxane, Kharokane, Xoraxai) is a term for Turkified or Muslim Romani people. While the term’s origin is uncertain, linguist Yaron Matras proposes an etymological link with the medieval Turkic Kara-Khanid Khanate. Muslim Xoroxane often trace their faith back to ancestors who adopted Islam during the Ottoman period in the Balkans.

== Dress ==
Muslim Romani women may wear silk Dimije also known as Turkish salvar, at weddings, circumcision ceremonies, and other festivals. Even on weekdays, quite a few older women, but also some younger women, wear the şalvar.

== Dance and music ==
Belly dance and Romano Hora (dance), Roman Havaları 8/9 tact, Zurna, Davul, Clarinet are performed. In the Ottoman Empire, especially young handsome Romani Guys were taken as Köçek-Dancers while young Romani female-dancers were named Çengi.

Muslim Roma who practice religious male circumcision, tend to hold their ceremonies (Bijav Suneti) with great pomp and festivity. The boys are often circumcised at the age of five, because the number 5 (panč) is considered a sacred symbol among some Romani people. It is a custom among some Muslim Roma that the prepuce be buried. During the ceremony, the child’s hand and feet are held by his Kirvo (godfather). A Kirvo pays the cost of the circumcision ceremony. The Tradition of a Kirve who is similar to a Sandek, is also practised in Alevism and Yazidism in Turkey.

== See also ==
- Arlije
- Gurbeti
- Sepečides Romani
- Zargari tribe
- Kakava
- Turkish Romani
