= Panagiotis Paiteris =

Greek footballer

Personal information
- Date of birth: 14 July 1997 (age 29)
- Place of birth: Larissa, Greece
- Height: 1.88 m (6 ft 2 in)
- Position: Goalkeeper

Team information
- Current team: Panthrakikos
- Number: 1

Youth career
- 2014–2016: Dotieas Agia
- 2016–2017: AEL

Senior career*
| Years | Team | Apps | (Gls) |
| 2017–2018 | Apollon Larissa | 24 | (0) |
| 2018–2019 | AEL | 0 | (0) |
| 2019 | Luftëtari | 11 | (0) |
| 2020–2021 | Asteras Vlachioti | 11 | (0) |
| 2021–2022 | Almopos Aridea | 20 | (0) |
| 2022–2023 | Trikala | | |
| 2023– | Panthrakikos | | |
- * Club domestic league appearances and goals as of 27 April 2022

Panagiotis Paiteris (Greek: Παναγιώτης Παϊτέρης; born 14 July 1997) is a Greek professional footballer who plays as a goalkeeper for Super League 2 club Panthrakikos. He is of Romani descent.
