= Islam in the Ottoman Empire =

Bursa Ulu Camii located at the first capital of the Ottoman Empire.

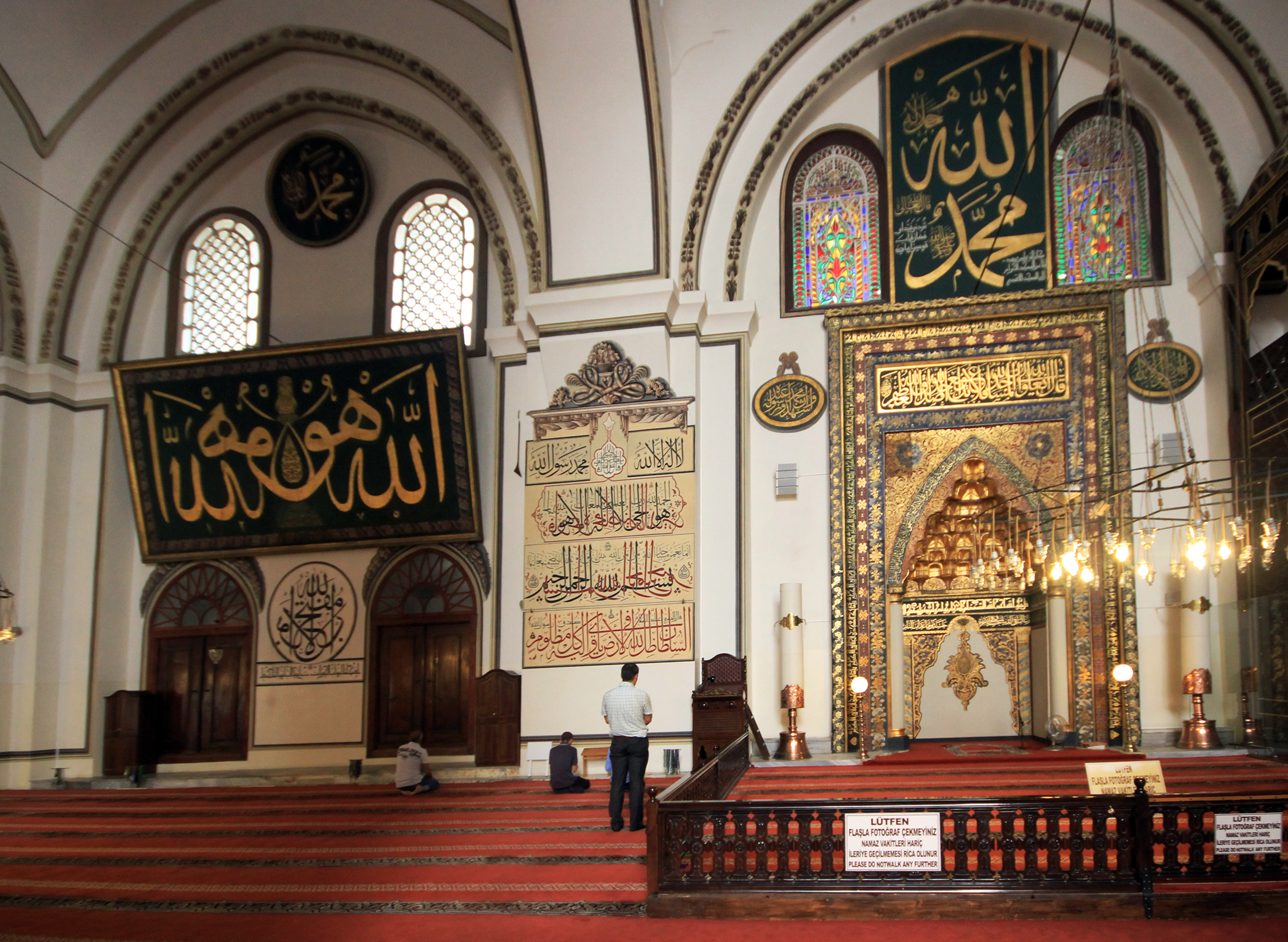
The mihrab of Bursa Ulu Camii in the above.

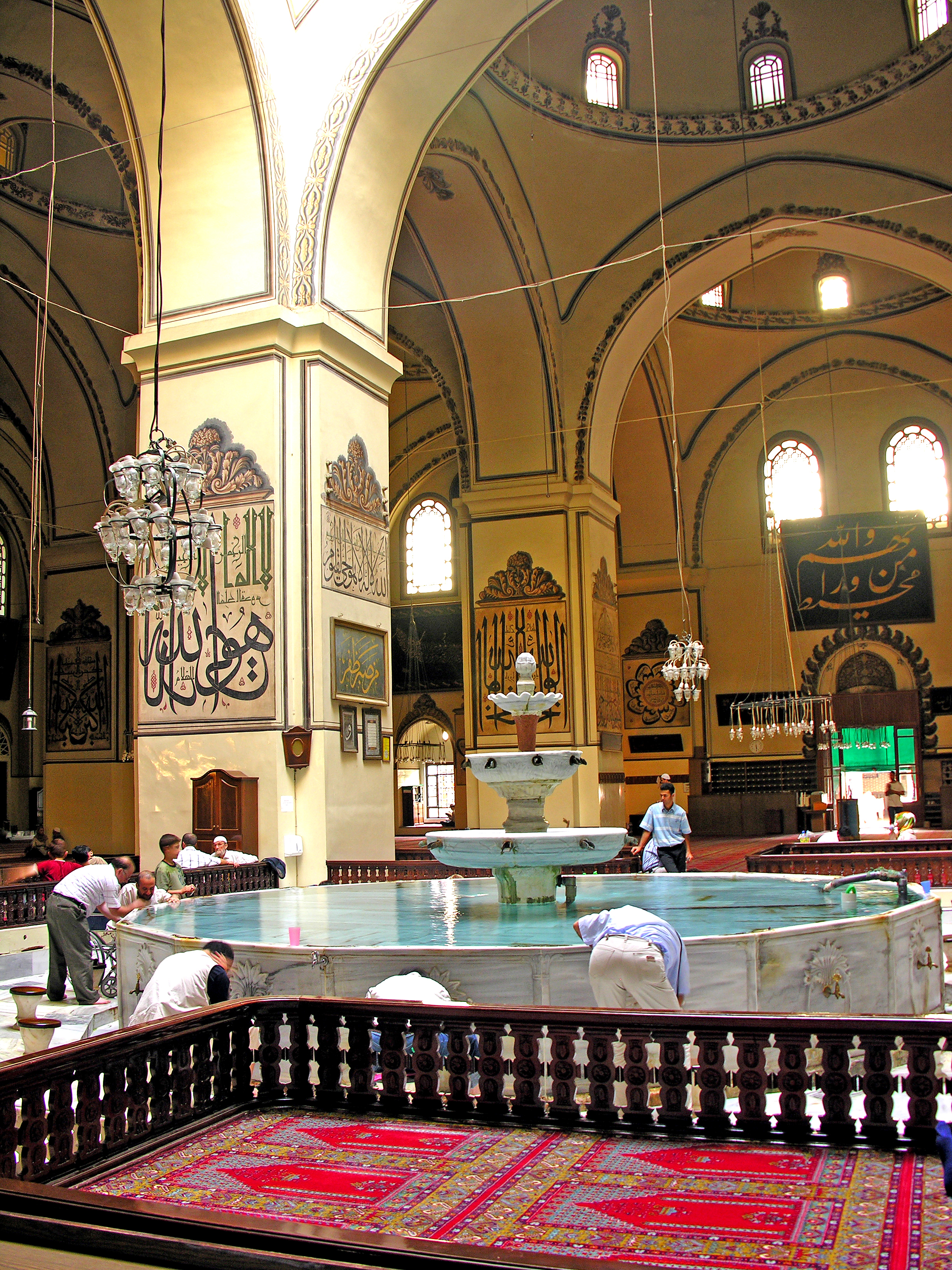
Şadırvan (Interior ablution area) in the above and its Dome in the image below.

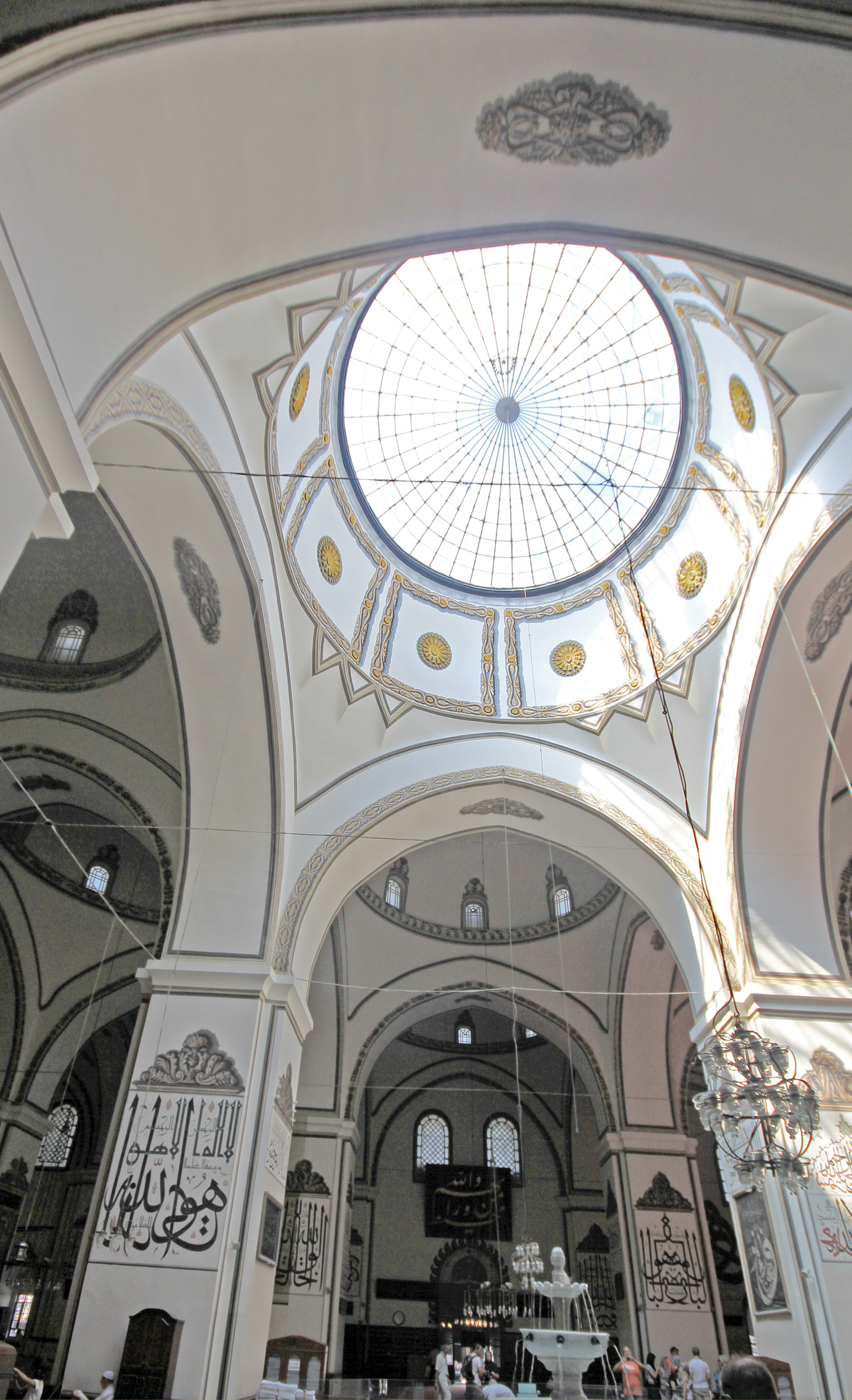
It was built by Ottoman Sultan Bayezid I, in between 1396-1400. It is located in the city center of Bursa. Ulu means in Turkish "the greatest" and it is the greatest, the biggest mosque in Bursa.

Sunni Islam was the official religion of the Ottoman Empire. The highest position in Islam, caliphate, was claimed by the sultan, after the defeat of the Mamluks which was established as the Ottoman Caliphate. The sultan was to be a devout Muslim and was given the literal authority of the caliph. Additionally, Sunni clerics had tremendous influence over government and their authority was central to the regulation of the economy. Despite all this, the sultan also had a right to the decree, enforcing a code called Kanun (law) in Turkish. Additionally, there was a supreme clerical position called the Sheykhulislam ("Sheykh of Islam" in Arabic). Minorities, particularly Christians and Jews but also some others, were mandated to pay the jizya, the poll tax as mandated by traditional Islam.

== Governance ==
Before the Tanzimat, the ruling institution, also known as the Muslim millet, was known as the Bab-ı Meşihat, the office of the Sheykhulislam. Other names used were the Bâb-ı Fetvâ, Meşîhat Dairesi or the Şeyhülislâm Kapısı (Gate of the Sheykhulislam).

== Sunni Islam ==
=== Creed and madhab ===
Since the founding of the Ottoman Empire, Ottoman law and religious life were defined by the Hanafi madhab (school of Islamic jurisprudence). With respect to creed, the Maturidi school was majorly adhered to, dominating madrassahs (Islamic Both the Maturidi and Ash'ari schools of Islamic theology used Ilm al-Kalam to understand the Quran and the hadith (sayings and actions of Mohammed and the Rashidun) so as to apply Islamic principles to fatwas (Islamic rulings)).

== Alevism ==
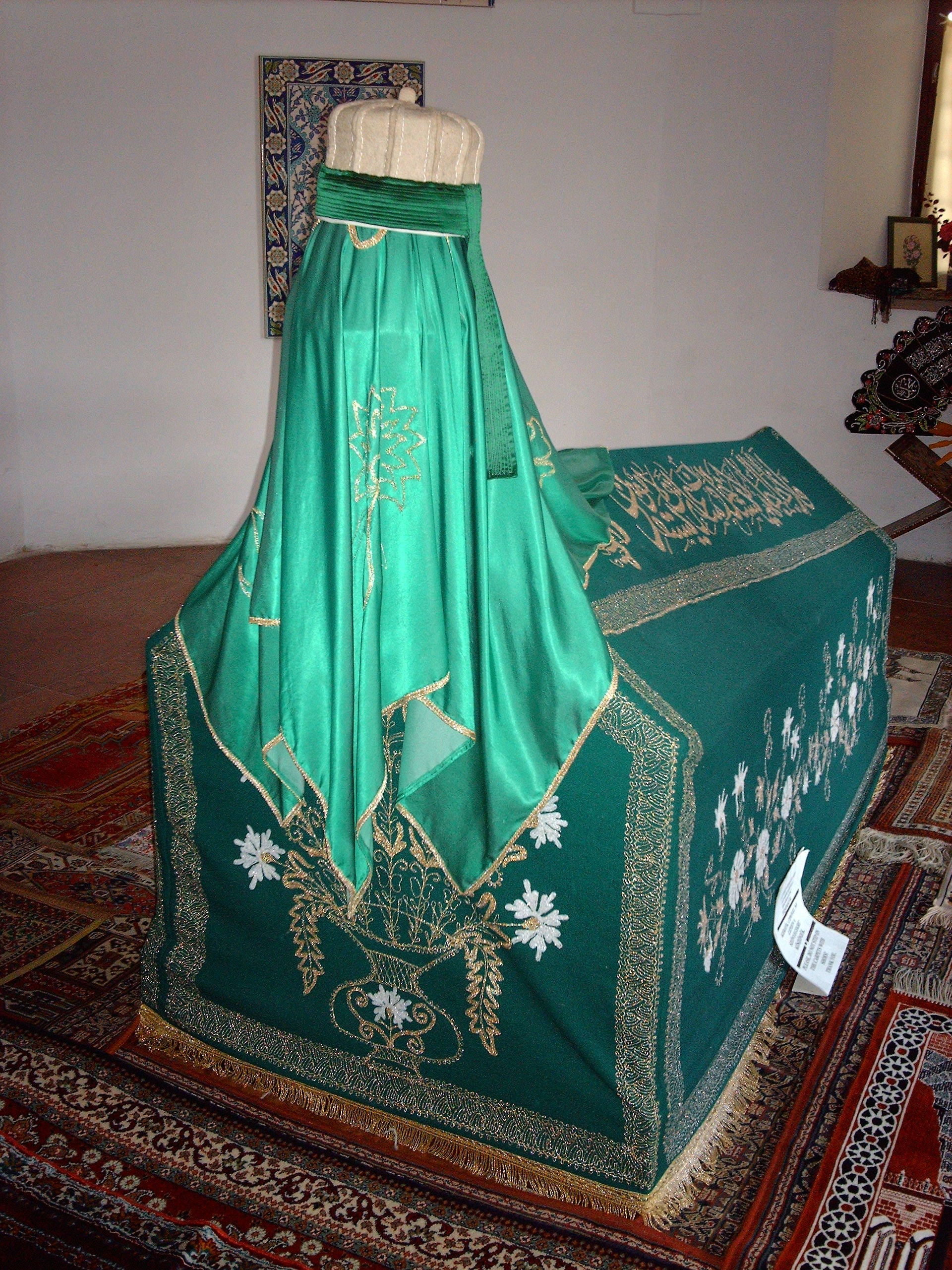
The tomb of Hurufi-Bektashi Dervish Gül Baba in Budapest, Hungary.

Because of their heterodox beliefs and practices, Alevis have been the target of historical and recent oppression. They sided with the Persian Empire against the Ottoman Empire and forty thousand Alevis were killed in 1514 by Ottomans. The Qizilbash of Anatolia found themselves on the "wrong" side of the Ottoman-Safavid border after 1555 Peace of Amasya. They become subjects of an Ottoman court that viewed them with suspicion. In that troubled period under Suleiman the Magnificent the Alevi people were persecuted and murdered.

== Footnotes ==
- Lewis, Raphaela (1971). Everyday Life in Ottoman Turkey. Dorset Press. p. 208.
