= Sevlengere =

Romani subgroup in Greece and Turkey

Languages
- Sepeči

Religion
- Islam

The Sevlengere, also known as Sevlengere Roma or Sepečides Roma (lit. 'basket-weaving Roma'), are a Romani subgroup in Greece and Turkey. Sevlengere traditionally speak Sepeči, a dialect of the Romani language, although the RomArchive claims the dialect is practically extinct. The Sepeči dialect is considered to be non-Vlax, and belongs to the Southern Balkan group of Romani dialects. The ancestors of the Sevlengere were basketweavers in Thessaloniki, and lived there as nomads during the Ottoman Empire until the population exchange between Greece and Turkey.

== Origin ==
Genetic research shows that the Romani people originated in the Indian subcontinent. Up until about 1920 the traditional profession of Sevlengere Roma was the making and selling of baskets. According to the Rombase of the University of Graz, "they all spoke Greek, some of them also Turkish, fluently." The Sevlengere Roma lived in communities in Greece (primarily in the Chalkidike peninsula) and later in Turkey.

During the population exchange between Greece and Turkey, the Christian and Greek Sepečides remained in Greece, as did the Muslims who adopted the Orthodox religion; those who remained Muslim went to Turkey. Many of the families that left Saloniki but remained in Greece settled in the Volos area and became Greek Orthodox. The others who were more inclined towards Turkish and the Muslim religion and who moved to Turkey speak only Turkish as their mother tongue. Some of the old settlements where they once lived include Tralangere (Trala, a village near Saloniki) and Kardičakere (also known as Karditsa, in northern Greece). In 1920, migrants wishing to avoid the Greco-Turkish War presented themselves as either Greeks or Turks and alternated between using two flags to identify themselves.

== Language ==
The dialect has many Greek and Turkish loanwords. The loanword verb markers in Romani "are often Greek derived markers, maintained even when contact with Greek has ceased." Linguist Petra Cech published a monograph codifying this dialect in 1996. Many of the Sepečides from Greece live in İzmir, where their descendants speak only Turkish.

== Greece ==
The Sevlengere that remained in Greece after 1923 moved south to settle in Volos. Their families primarily speak a Greek dialect with some Turkish words. They tend to call themselves Sevlengere Roma. The younger generation's first language is believed to be Romani, followed by Greek. The Sevlengere on the island of Skyros include Christian Roma who remained in Greece as well as the descendants of Muslim Roma who stayed and converted to Orthodox Christianity. Some of the Orthodox Christian Sevlengere also settled in Volax. The Sevlengere who remained in Greece at Volos took up the additional profession of carpet trade, unlike their Roma relatives in İzmir.

== Turkey ==
In Menemen, some Sevlengere still make baskets. In Anamur, Edremit, Düzce and Kozan, they also weave baskets. Some settled in East Thrace and Evreşe at Gelibolu after 1923 and still make baskets. In Istanbul, some became flower sellers or musicians. A group of Sevlengere settled in the 1950s in Söke where they still weave baskets. Some words and phrases from the old Sepeči dialect survived, but the main language of the Sevlengere in Turkey is now Turkish.

== See also ==
- Sepetciler Palace
- Basketry Museum of the Roma
