= Basketmakers' Kiosk =

Coordinates: 41°00′59″N 28°58′52″E

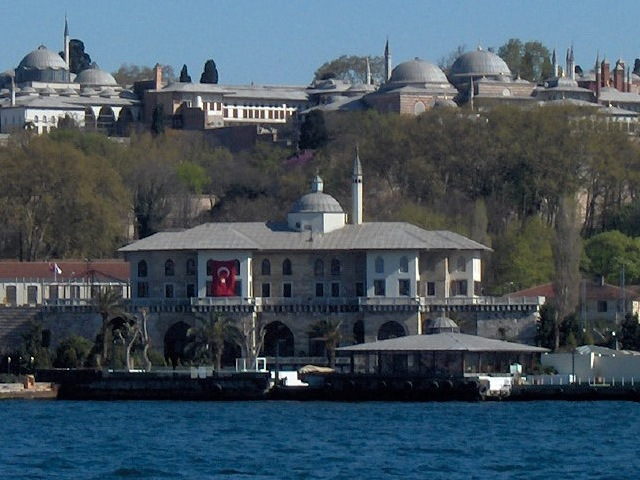
The Basketmakers' Kiosk on the shore, seen from the Bosphorus

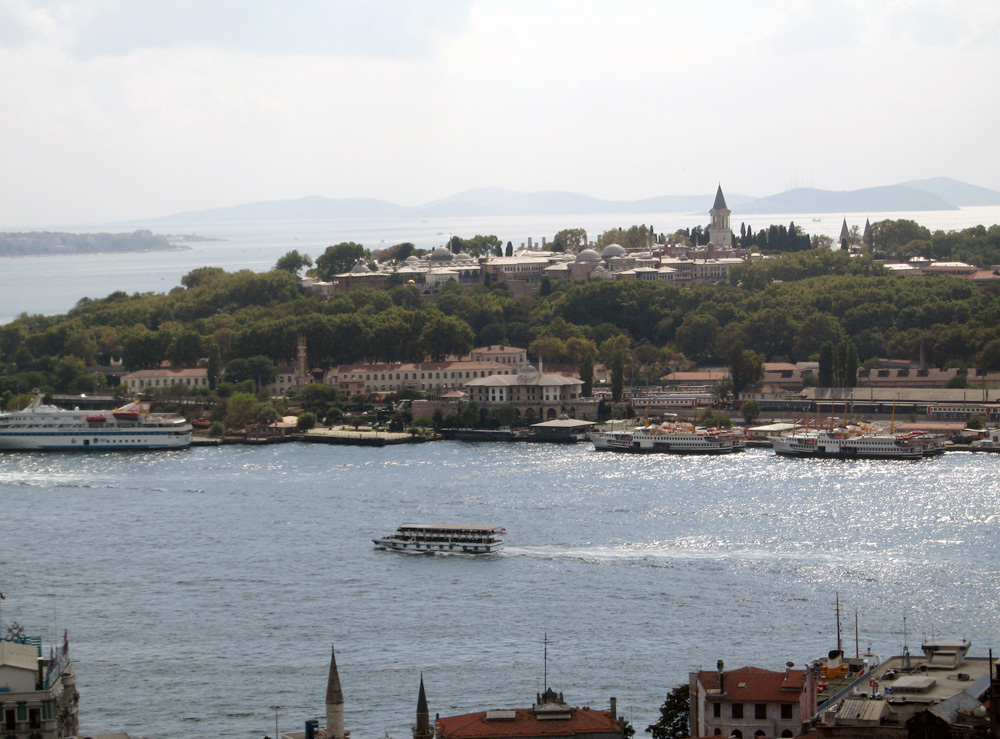
The Basketmakers' Kiosk and Topkapı Palace in the back, seen from Galata

The Basketmakers' Kiosk (Turkish: Sepetçiler Köşkü), also known as Basketmakers' Palace (Turkish: Sepetçiler Kasrı), named after the Sepetçiler Roma, is a former Ottoman pleasure palace located on the southern shore of Golden Horn's mouth at Sarayburnu in the neighborhood of Sirkeci in Istanbul, Turkey.

== History ==
The Basketmakers' Kiosk was constructed under Sultan Ibrahim in 1643 on the Byzantine-era sea walls, within the outer garden of Topkapı Palace. It is the only surviving structure from the palace's former coastal and outer-garden buildings. According to the inscription above the door arch, the kiosk was renovated in 1739 during the reign of Sultan Mahmud I. Various explanations have been given for the origin of its name. One tradition connects it with basketmaker tradesmen working in the area, while another derives it from the name Sepetçi or Sultani used for elevated palace structures at Edirne Palace.

Serving initially as the government's Foreign Press Office and International Press Center following its recent renovation in 1980, the prominent place with its indoor and open-air facilities for meetings and banquets was once managed by Swissôtel.

The imperial structure, a former part of the Topkapı Palace complex, is situated on top of the ancient Golden Horn Wall at Marmaroporta ("Marble Gate") (Turkish: Yalıköşkü Kapısı) just below Topkapı Palace. It was erected next to, yet no more existing, Yalı Köşkü, a waterfront pavilion, which was built by Selim I and served to many sultans as a place for reception of Kapudan Pashas (fleet admirals) and for salutation of the fleet before setting sail to a campaign or after returning from a campaign.

The palace on four floors with thick stone-built walls has spacious halls with high wooden doors. It has a panoramic view to the Galata Bridge, the Galata Tower, Karaköy and the Bosphorus. The building was turned into a warehouse after alterations made in the 19th century. During the Republic era, it was used as an army pharmacy and then left empty until its restoration in the late 1980s. Renovation work, carried out with reference to old pictures, enabled the restoration of the building to its original state.

Having been abandoned for a long period of time, the building was restored by the Directorate General of Old Works and Museums in 1980. After restorations, it was used as the International Press Centre of the General Directorate of Press and Information. The Eminonu Service Foundation restored the pavilion in 1998. Sepetçiler Pavilion has served in various capacities, such as a restaurant in addition to as the Directorate General of Press, and was used as the Project Office of European Capital of Culture until June 2011.

== Turkish Green Crescent Headquarters ==
Allocated to Turkish Green Crescent Society as of 2011, Sepetçiler Pavilion is now used as the General Headquarters building of the Turkish Green Crescent Society. The Green Crescent is a non-profit and non-governmental organization that empowers youth and adults with factual information about drugs so they can make informed decisions against different kind of addictions including alcohol, tobacco, drug, and gambling. The Green Crescent was established in 1920 and given the status of Public-Beneficial Society (public beneficial society status is given to the organizations that serve for public benefits) by the Turkish government in 1934.

== See also ==
- Ottoman architecture

== Literature ==
- Fanny Davis. Palace of Topkapi in Istanbul. 1970. ASIN B000NP64Z2
- Necipoğlu, Gülru (1991). Architecture, ceremonial, and power: The Topkapi Palace in the fifteenth and sixteenth centuries. Cambridge, Massachusetts: The MIT Press. pp. 336 pages. ISBN 0-262-14050-0.
