= Kakava =

Turkish Romani celebration

Kakava is a celebration event of Romani people in Turkey. Its place of origin is East Thrace in Turkey.

== Events ==
The belief that a Savior Baba Fingo would come and rescue them is immortal in the Romani folklore of the Romanlar in Turkey. It is believed he was a Commander of the Pharaoh-Troops from the Military of ancient Egypt. Although the Roma in Turkey are officially Muslims, the pre-Islamic Kakava (Cauldron Festival) has been preserved in Eastern Thrace. It is celebrated on May 5-6 in Edirne with great fanfare and attracts foreign visitors. The main meaning of the festival is the popular belief of the East-Thracian Turkish Roma in a redeemer named Baba Fingo, who once led the Roma people out of Egypt along with Moses and the Hebrews—a strong reference Sources and parallels of the Exodus and Erev Rav. Turkish Roma go down to the edge of the river Tundzha, at the night of 5–6 May that they decided as the day "Rescue Event" had happened. They put candles in the River and wash their hands, face and feet in the water, for the memory of the miraculous day. The main source of joy is the immortality of the Savior Baba Fingo. In Turkish a saying: Baba Fingo Gelecek, Bütün Dertler Bitecek (Father Fingo Will Come, All Troubles Will Be Over). For that reason, they entertain madly.

== Kakava in Turkey ==
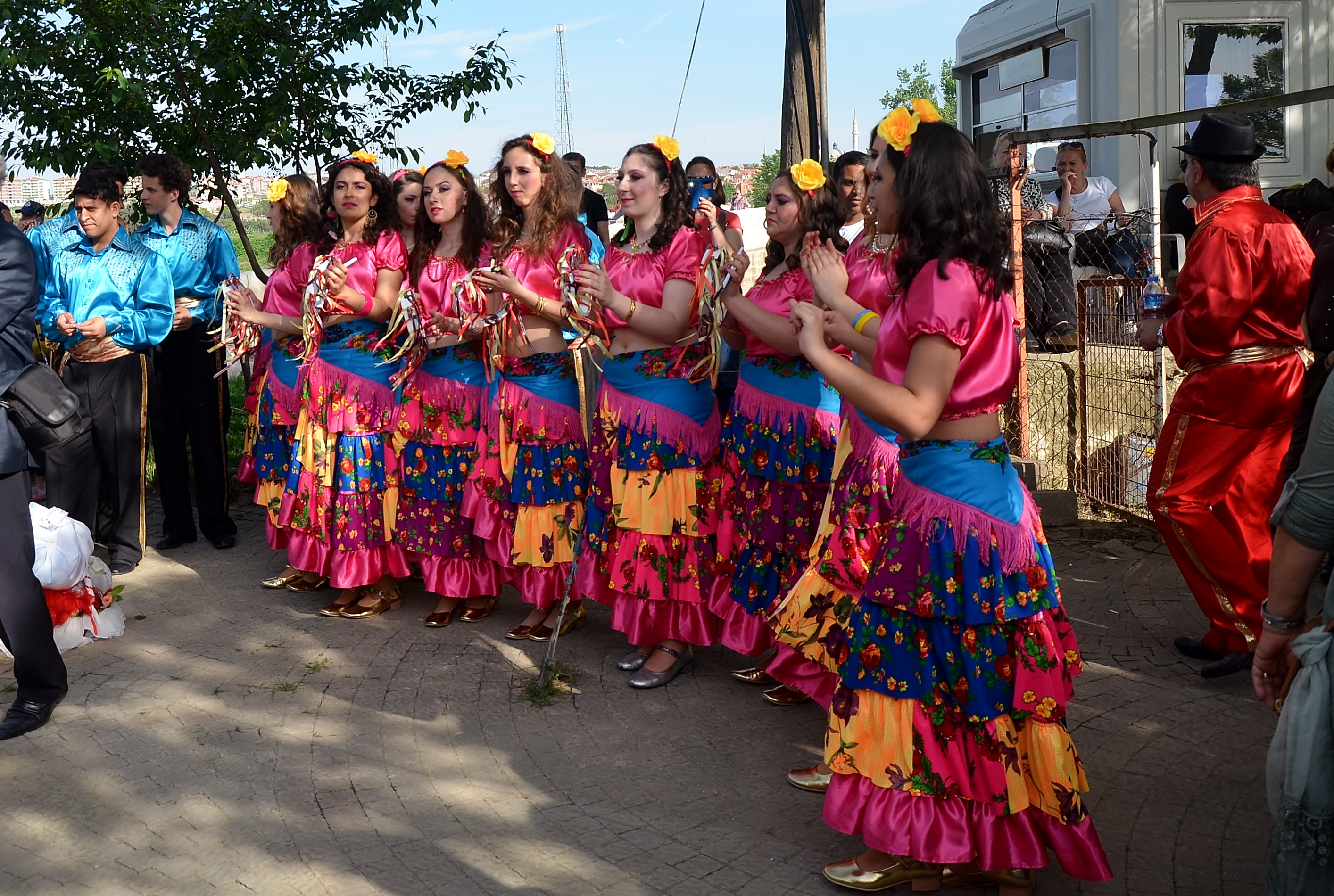
Dancing Roma women by music during Kakava 2015 in Edirne.

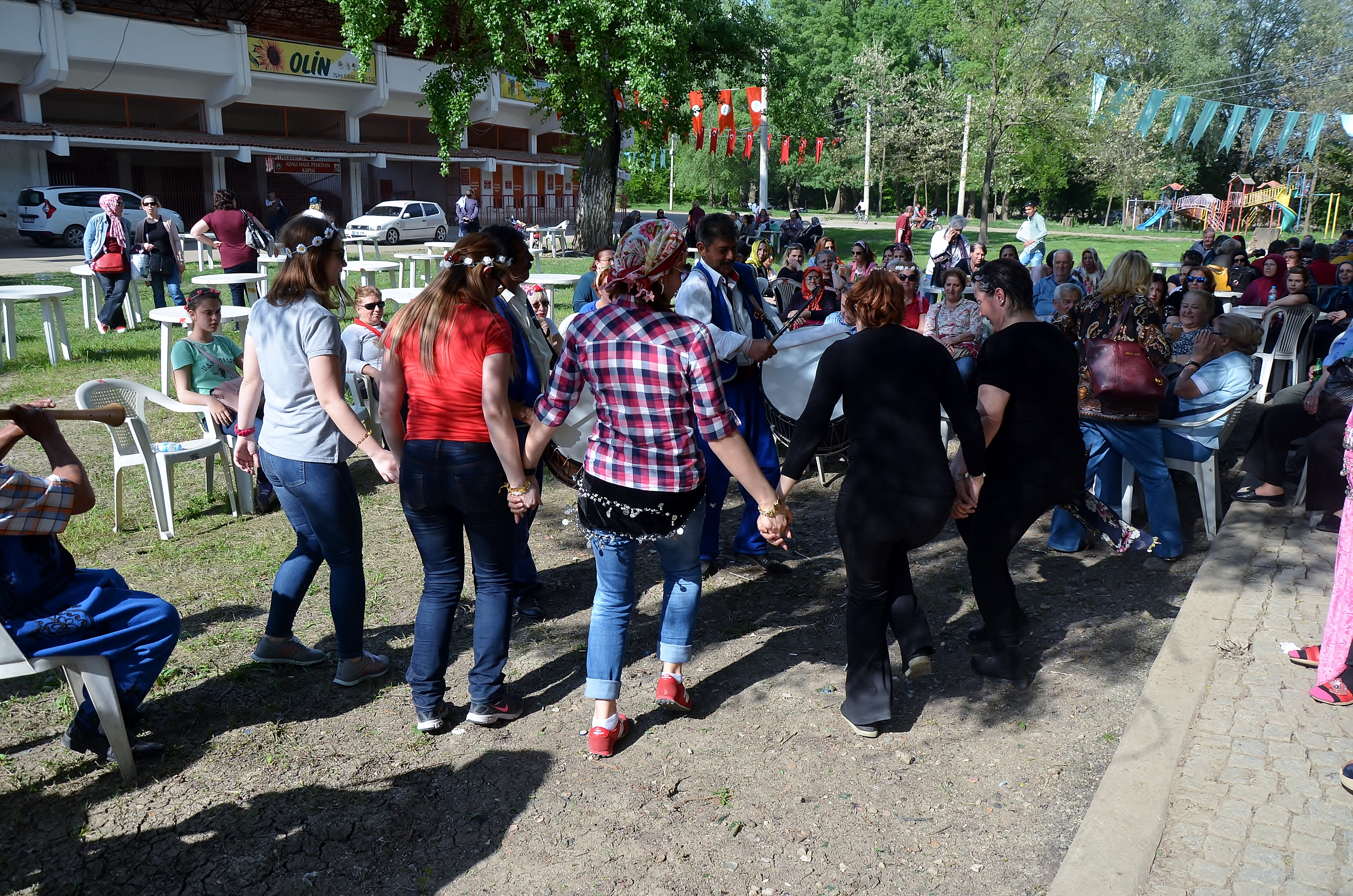
Dancing women to Roma music during Kakava 2015 in Edirne.

In Turkey's western cities of Edirne and Kırklareli, Kakava is celebrated joyfully. Kakava celebration in Edirne nowadays takes the form of an international festival, which is also supported by the governor and the mayor of Edirne. The official part of the Kakava festival takes place in Sarayiçi, the place where traditional Kırkpınar oil-wrestling tournament is held each year. After light the Bonfire and jump over it. Music playing and Belly dancing is performed. The official part ends after the distribution of rice dish pilaf to the around 5,000 attendees. The celebration continues in the dawn of the next day at the bank of Tunca River.

== See also ==
- Hıdırellez
- Đurđevdan
