= Romano-Greek =

Mixed language of Romani people in Greece

- Native to: Greece
- Native speakers: (none cited 2000); 30 use it as a secret language (2000)
- Language family: mixed Romani–Greek
- Dialects: Dortika (in Eurytania); Kaliarda (in Athens)

Language codes
- ISO 639-3: rge
- Glottolog: roma1240
- Romano-Greek is classified as Critically Endangered by the UNESCO Atlas of the World's Languages in Danger (As of 2024)

Romano-Greek (also referred to as Hellenoromani; Greek: Ελληνο-ρομανική, romanized: Elleno-romaniké) is a nearly extinct mixed language (referred to as Para-Romani in Romani linguistics), spoken by the Romani people in Greece that arose from language contact between Romani speaking people and the Greek language. The language is suspected to be a secret language spoken in Thessaly and Central Greece Administrative Unit. Typologically the language is structured on Greek with heavy lexical borrowing from Romani. Dortika is a secret language spoken mainly in Athens by traveling builders from Eurytania Prefecture. In both cases, the languages are most likely not native to their speakers.
