= Rumelian Romani =

Southern Romani dialect

- Native to: former Ottoman Rumelia
- Ethnicity: Muslim Roma
- Language family: Indo-European: Indo-Iranian; Indo-Aryan; Central Indo-Aryan; Romani; Balkan Romani; Southern Balkan Romani; Rumelian Romani

Language codes
- ISO 639-3: –
- Glottolog: pasp1238

Rumelian Romani is a dialect of Southern Balkan Romani of strong Turkish pronunciation with Turkish and Greek loanwords, once was spoken by the Turkish-Muslim Roma (Xoraxane) in Ottoman Rumelia, especially by the Sedentary Rumelian Romani people of various groups in Edirne in East Thrace First described by Evliya Çelebi's Seyahatname in 1668, of the Muslim Roma in Gümülcine, and later by William Marsden in 1785 and by Alexandros Georgios Paspatis (Paspati), a scholar of the Romani language in 1870. This Romani dialect is almost extinct in Turkey, but still spoken by Muslim Roma in Western Thrace today.
