= Arlije =

Romani people in North Macedonia

Arlije Erlides Yerli
Languages
- Balkan Romani, Macedonian, Albanian, Balkan Gagauz

Religion
- Cultural Muslims

The sedentary Arlije (Serbo-Croatian: Арлије, Macedonian: Арлии) are the main group of the Romani people in North Macedonia, and the majority live in Šuto Orizari Municipality. They are Muslim Romani. There are various subgroups of the Arlije, named after their traditional occupations, living in North Macedonia, Kosovo, Southern Serbia, and Montenegro. Beside Macedonian and Albanian, they speak the Arli dialect of Balkan Romani. The word Arlije (singular Arli) is derived from the Turkish word yerli (meaning "native" or "settled"), as does the name Erlides (Greek: Ερλίδες, of a similar group living in Greece,) and the Sofia-Erli in Bulgaria. The biggest settlement of Arlije is in Šuto Orizari in North Macedonia. In European Turkey they are called Yerli Romanlar and only speak Rumelian Turkish.

Many Arlije have moved to Austria and Germany as guest workers. Some Arli men have married Austrian and German women.

== Genetics ==
While the Early Romani people traces back to the Indian subcontinent, gene flow from the Ottoman Turks also spilled over and established a higher frequency of the Y-haplogroups J and E3b in Balkan Roma Groups. A. G. Paspati wrote in 1860 that Turkish men often married Roma women. There is also Greek-Slavic DNA in the Balkan Roma people.

== People of Arlije descent ==
- Šaban Bajramović
- Esma Redžepova
- Muharem Serbezovski
