= Balkan Romani =

Romani dialect of the Balkans

- Balkaniko Romanes
- Native to: Bulgaria, North Macedonia, Kosovo, Serbia, Greece, Albania, Bosnia and Herzegovina, Turkey, Romania, Croatia, Slovenia, Hungary, Moldova
- Ethnicity: Roma, Jerlídes (North Macedonia, southern Serbia).
- Speakers: L1: 600,000 (2013); L2: 200,000
- Language family: Indo-European: Indo-Iranian; Indo-Aryan; Romani; Balkan Romani
- Dialects: Arli, Dzambazi, East Bulgarian Romani, Greek Romani, Ironworker Romani, Rumelian, Sepečides, Tinners Romani, Ursári (Erli, Usari), Lovari, Zargari

Language codes
- ISO 639-3: rmn
- Glottolog: balk1252
- ELP: Balkan Romani

Balkan Romani or Balkaniko Romanes is a specific non-Vlax dialect of the Romani language, spoken by groups within the Balkans. The Balkan Romani language is typically an oral language.

== History ==
Most of the people who speak Balkan Romani are Roma themselves. Another meaning of the prefix rom is someone belonging to the Roma ethnicity. The Roma are ultimately of Indian origin. Speakers of the Balkan Romani language have constantly migrated throughout the years into all parts of Europe. Since these speakers have migrated to different parts of Europe, new dialects have formed. Although the Roma originated in India, they are now widespread throughout all of Europe.

== Dialects ==
Balkan dialects, also known as Balkan I, are spoken in Albania, Bulgaria, Greece, Iran, North Macedonia, Moldova, Romania, Serbia, Turkey and Ukraine. This group includes inter alia Arli Romani (Greece, North Macedonia), Sepečides Romani (Greece, Turkey), Ursari Romani (Moldavia, Romania) and Crimean Romani (Ukraine).

Zis dialects, also called Balkan II, are a distinct subdivision within the Balkan group. Bugurdži, Drindari and Kalajdži Romani are spoken in North Macedonia, Kosovo, Serbia and in northern and central Bulgaria.

Elšík uses this classification and dialect examples (geographical information from Matras):

== Geographical distribution ==
Sub-group	Dialect	Place
Southern Balkan	Prizren	Kosovo
	Arli	Greece, Albania, North Macedonia, Serbia
	Prilep	North Macedonia
	Kyrymitika	Crimea
	Sofia Erli	Sofia
	Zargari	Iran
	Sepeči	northern Greece at Volos, west Turkey at Izmir
	Rumelian	European part of today's Turkey, historically called Rumelia
Northern Balkan	Bugurdži	North Macedonia, Serbia
	Razgrad Drindari	northeastern Bulgaria
	Pazardžik Kalajdži	Bulgaria and immigrants in North Macedonia and Serbia

== Phonology ==
Balkan Romani retains the aspirated consonants /pʰ, tʰ, tʃʰ, kʰ/ of other Indic languages. These are distinctive in the majority of Romani varieties.

== Orthography ==
Balkan Romani does not have a written standard. There has been an attempt at standardization, at a 1992 conference in North Macedonia, based on the Arli dialect and using the Latin script. /x/ and /h/ are distinctive in some dialects, but not in the Arli dialect and so are not distinguished in writing. the two rhotics are also not distinguished. Schwa is rare in Arli; where it does occur, it is substituted with the vowel of Džambaz or some other dialect, e.g. vërdon → vurdon 'wagon'. Aspiration in a root is always written, e.g. jakh 'eye'. Final devoicing is not written, e.g. dad 'father'. Palatalization is not written, e.g. buti 'work' (not buči etc.), kerdo 'done' (not ćerdo etc.), pani 'water' (not pai etc.).

The proposed alphabet is as follows:

a b c č čh d dž e f g h i j k kh l m n o p ph r s š t th u v ž

== Vocabulary ==
Turkish lexical influence is a defining and extremely important part of the Romani dialect in the Balkans. Most of the words however, originate from Persian. Loans from Persian, Armenian, and Byzantine Greek make up the pre-European lexicon. Ultimately, it is hard to trace the definite origin of all the words because the words of Balkan Romani originate from many sources and the sources of those languages create a complex puzzle.

Romani (Bugurdži, Macedonia)	Romani (Arli, Macedonia)	English
Lačho [to] saba[h]i.	Lačho [o] sabalje.	Good morning.
Lačho [to] zi[e]s.	Lačho [o] dive.	Good day.
Lačhi [ti] rat.	Lačhi [i] rat.	Good night.
Sar isi to anav?	Sar si tiro anav?	What's your name?
Mo anav isi Elvis.	Mo anav si Elvis.	My name is Elvis.
Isinom lošalo kaj avdom tut!	Šukar te dikhav tut!	Pleased to meet you!
Isinan prandime?	Sijan li romnjakoro?	Are you married?
Va, me isinom prandime.	Va, me sijum romnjakoro.	Yes, I'm married.
Na, me isinom biprandime.	Na, me sijum biromnjakoro.	No, I'm unmarried.
Me isi man raklija.	Me si ma raklija.	I have a girlfriend.

Number	Romani	Literal Meaning
1	jekh	1
2	duj	2
3	trin	3
4	štar	4
5	panc	5
6	šov	6
7	eftá	7
8	oxtó	8
9	enjá	9
10	deš	10
11	dešujekh	10 + 1
12	dešuduj	10 + 2
13	dešutrín	10 + 3
14	dešuštár	10 + 4
15	dešupánc	10 + 5
16	dešušóv	10 + 6
17	dešueftá	10 + 7
18	dešuoxtó	10 + 8
19	dešuenjá	10 + 9
20	biš	20
21	biš-te-jekh	20 + 1
22	biš-te-duj	20 + 2
23	biš-te-trin	20 + 3
24	biš-te-štar	20 + 4
25	biš-te-panc	20 + 5

== Grammar ==
Turkish grammar plays a large role in Balkan Romani. The use of Turkish conjugations is widely embedded within Balkan Romani and oftentimes, it is difficult to tell the difference between the grammar of the two languages depending on geography. Balkan Romani has compartmentalized grammar originating from Turkish verbal paradigms along with some Greek influence. Much of the morphology of the language has Greek and Turkish origins, which is why the language is viewed by many professionals as a dialect continuum and thus it is hard to see where one language ends and the other begins. All Romani dialects use Greek derived nominal endings, masculine nouns and loan nouns.

=== Morphology ===
The morphology of the Balkan Romani language is again heavily influenced by both the Turkish and Greek languages. Many people view this language as a sort of melting pot because there are so many different influences on it. Turkish and Greek might be the most influential languages on Balkan Romani but other languages, such as Armenian, have also influenced it. Part of the substrate of Balkan Romani appears to be derived from medieval northern Indian languages.
