= Romani people in Cyprus =

Minority in Cyprus

Romano narodo ando Cyprus (Romani)

Total population
- 1,250 (0.16% of the population)

Regions with significant populations
- Larnaca, Morphou and Famagusta (Gurbeti), Limassol, Paphos, Nicosia

Languages
- Cypriot Turkish and Gurbetcha, Cypriot Greek and Romani language

Religion
- Islam, Greek Orthodox Church, Romani mythology

Romani people are an ethnic minority in Cyprus.

Cypriot Roma are related to Turkish Roma and Greek Roma. Between 1,000 and 1,200 Romani people live in Cyprus.

The Cypriot Muslim Roma live in the north part of Cyprus. According to the 1960 Constitution of the Republic of Cyprus, this group of people does not constitute a separate national group but it is considered to belong to the Turkish Cypriot (T/C) community and share the Turkish cultural traditions. There are no official records of the arrival of Roma-Gurbeties in Cyprus. It is believed that they arrived after the conquest of the island by the Ottomans from the Venetians in 1551. They are Muslims and they speak both Cypriot Turkish dialect and Gurbetcha (Cypriot language variation). They call themselves as Gurbet and their “language” Gurbetcha.

The Orthodox Christian Cypriot Roma live in the Southern part of Cyprus and are called Mandi. Cypriot Christian Roma speak Romani in their homes and Cypriot Greek and maintaining, except for well-known singers and musicians.

In 1960 the Gurbets were not registered as an ethnic minority but as T/Cypriots. In 1974 the Gurbets moved to the north and the Mandia came to the south. The Mandithes in fact always lived mostly in the south, in Larnaca, but some also in Limassol, Paphos and Tylliria, and in Nicosia at the present area of Ayii Omologites, then known as Mandochori. In Kythrea they built their own church, near Syrkania, dedicated to St George of the Mandia. They were known for their excellent skills of tinning.

The Council of Europe has estimated that there are approximately 1,250 Romani people living in Cyprus (0.16% of the population).

== History ==
Various groups of Romani have lived in Cyprus for over 500 years. The first Roma immigrants arrived between 1322 and 1400.

== See also ==
- Gurbeti
- Romani people in Greece
- Romani people in Turkey
