= Sijerčić =

Sijerčić is a Bosnian surname. Notable people with the surname include:

- Hedina Tahirović-Sijerčić (born 1960), Bosnian Gurbeti Romani journalist, broadcaster, writer, translator, linguistic researcher and teacher
- Sanela Sijerčić (born 1976), Bosnian folk singer
- Sinan Pasha Sijerčić (died 1806), Ottoman Bosnian general
