= Arnaoutogeitonia =

Neighborhood of Limassol, Cyprus

Coordinates: 34°40′27″N 33°02′02″E

Arnaoutigitonia (or Arnaoudkia or Arnaout) (Greek: Αρναουτογειτονιά ή Αρναουθκιά ή Αρναούτ) is a Neighbourhood, Quarter, Mahalla or Parish of the Municipality of Limassol.

== Location ==
To the west it borders with Agios Ioannis, to the north and east with Katholiki, to the southeast and south with Tzami Tzentit and to the southwest with Tsiflikoudia. Arnaoutogeitonia is located to the west of the Garyllis river.

== Population ==
It was mostly inhabited by Turkish Cypriots, until 1974, its currently inhabited by Greek Cypriot refugees and after the 2004 reopening of the crossing points with Turkish Cypriots and Gurbeti that returned.

== History ==
The district got its name from the Turkish word Arnaout, which means Albanian. The district had a significant population of Turkish-Albanians brought by the Ottomans in the 19th century to establish a colony. Either by mistake or for reasons of convenience, the Greek Cypriots called the whole district Arnaout or Arnaoudkia. The district is built around the Arnaut Mosque of Limassol. In the district there were handicrafts and workshops, cafes and sports clubs, as well as a winter cinema. In 2019 the Cyprus Republic published which areas of the mainly Turkish-Cypriot owned Arnaoutogeitonia will be used for public interests.
