= Tzami Tzentit =

District of Limassol, Cyprus

Tzami Tzentit Τζαμί Τζεντίτ (Greek) Cami Cedit (Turkish)
- Quarter
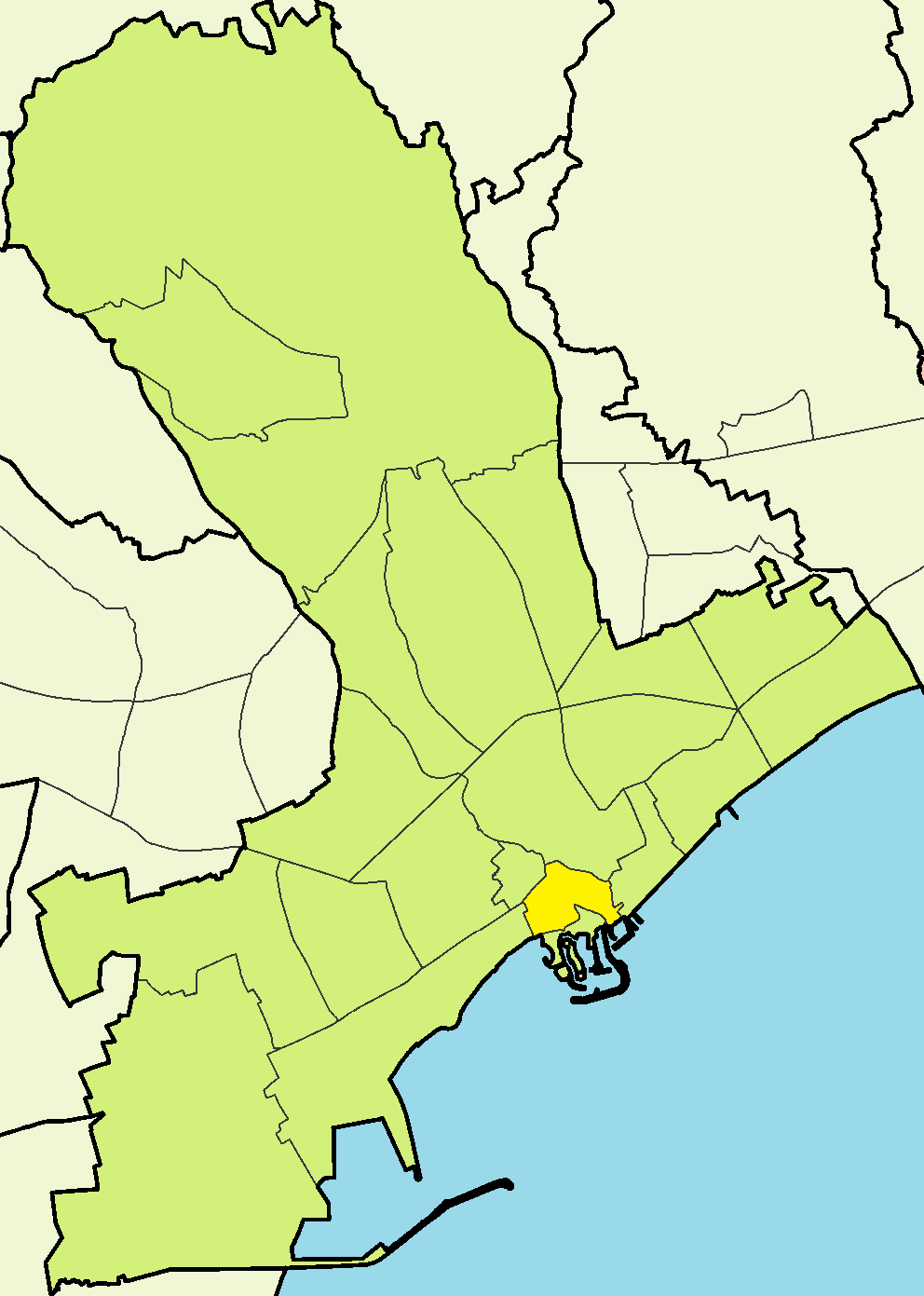
- Country: Cyprus
- District: Limassol
- Municipality: Limassol
- Postal Code: 3042
- Geographic Code: 5000-02

Tzami Tzentit (Turkish: Cami Cedit, lit. 'New Mosque', Greek: Τζαμί Τζεντίτ, romanized: Tzami Tzentit), is a district of the municipality of Limassol.

== Location ==
It borders Tsiflikoudia to the west, Arnaoutogeitonia to the northwest, Katholiki to the northeast, Ayia Napa to the east and Agios Antonios to the south. Its southeastern part is coastal. The old port of Limassol was built on this site. In its place today is a fishing port with tourist and entertainment facilities.

== History ==
The Tzami Tzentit area was the largest Turkish Cypriot district of Limassol since the beginning of Turkish rule. It was the center of the Turkish Cypriot trade, economic and educational activities in Limassol, with multiple coffee shops, warehouses, houses and a cinema. Tzami means mosque and the area got its name from the Tzami Tzentit Mosque.

== Religious and listed buildings ==
An important building in the district is the Tzentit Mosque (Friday Mosque). It is located on the banks of the river Garyllis, at the western end of Angiras street. It was built in 1835 by Hatzi Ibrahim Aga (known as Koproulou), after promising to build a temple in the area if he returned safely from the Battle of Accra in Palestine. The mosque was destroyed in 1894 due to flooding of the river. It was rebuilt in 1909. The Tzentit Mosque is also known as Cami-i Cedit (New Mosque) or Koproulou Ibrahim Mosque or Dere Camisi (Stream Mosque). The mosque used to have a madrasa.

In addition, the medieval castle of Limassol is located within the administrative boundaries of the district.

=== June 2020 ===
On 1 June 2020, Tzentit Mosque was attacked with molotov bombs and racist statements were sprayed on the walls. The incident was mentioned in the Turkish newspaper Hürriyet and discussed by all political parties in the Republic of Cyprus and by the president of Northern Cyprus. The Mayor of Limassol, Nicos Nicolaides, in the next day assured that actions will be taken so that such incidents cannot easily take place in future.

== Area Map ==
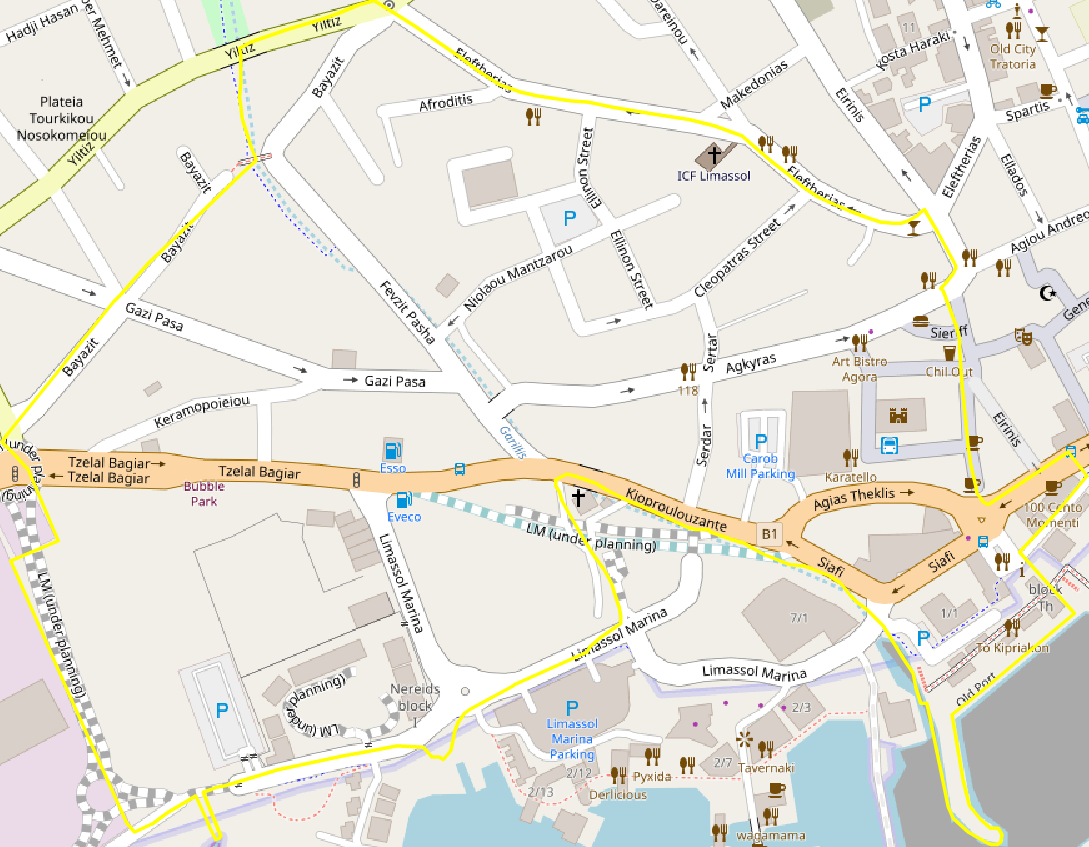
Location and area of Limassol Tzami Tzentit
