= Agios Ioannis (Limassol) =

Agios Ioannis (Greek: Άγιος Ιωάννης; Greek for Saint John) is a district of Limassol Municipality, Cyprus.

== Location ==
To the west it borders with Omonoia, to the north with Apostolos Andreas, to the east with Katholiki, to the southeast with Arnaoutogitonia and to the south with Tsiflikoudia.

== Sport teams and establishments ==
In the district of Agios Ioannis are the Indoor Stadium Nikos Solomonidis (owned by AEL Limassol) and the indoor stadium Apollon Limassol (owned by Apollon Limassol).

== Area map ==
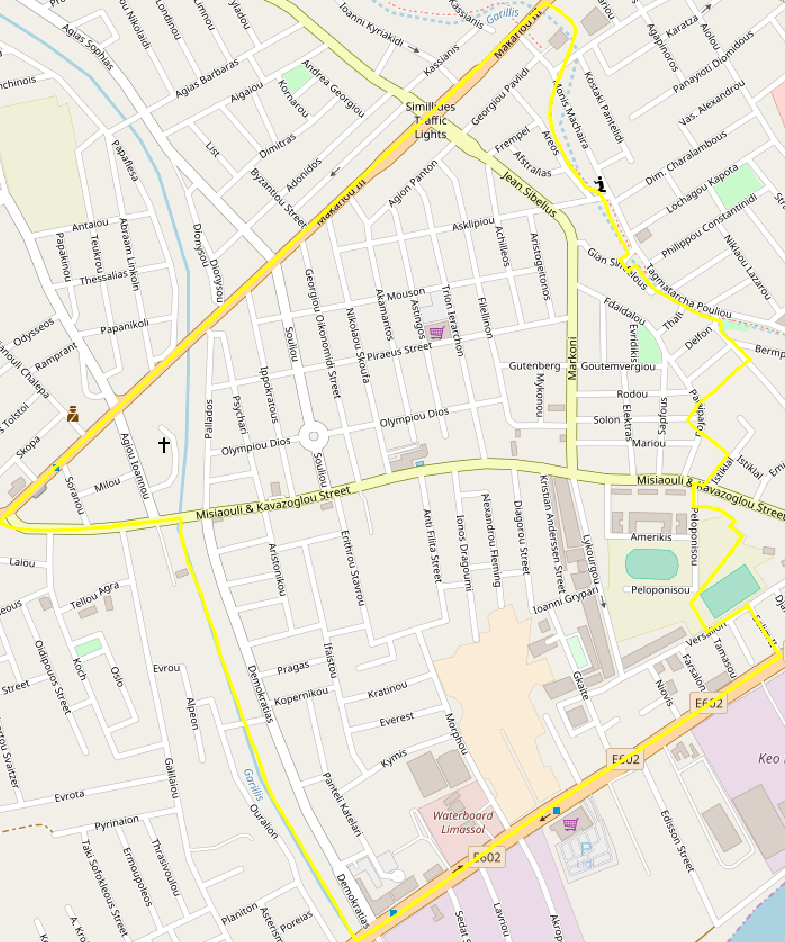
Local Map of Agios Ioannis quarter of Limassol Municipality Cyprus
