= Early Romani =

Latest common predecessor of all forms of the Romani language

- Late Proto-Romani
- Region: Byzantine Empire
- Ethnicity: Romani
- Era: 9th–14th centuries; developed into the Romani language and its varieties
- Language family: Indo-European: Indo-Iranian; Indo-Aryan; Early Romani

Language codes
- ISO 639-3: –

Early Romani, sometimes referred to as Late Proto-Romani, is the latest common predecessor of all varieties of the Romani language. It was spoken before the Romani people dispersed throughout Europe. It is not directly attested, but rather reconstructed on the basis of shared features of existing Romani varieties. Early Romani is thought to have been spoken in the Byzantine Empire from the 9th to 10th and the 13th to 14th centuries.

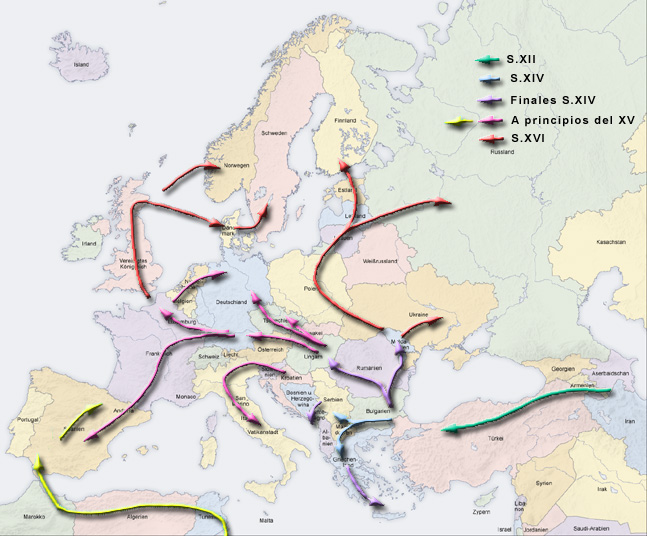
The dispersal of the Romani throughout Europe (shown in image) led to the divergence of their original language (Early Romani) into many varieties.

== Phonology ==
=== Vowels ===
The vowels were as follows:

The vowels of Early Romani
	Front	Central	Back
Close	i		u
Mid	e		o
Open		a	

=== Consonants ===
The consonants were as follows:

Early Romani consonants
	Labial		Alveolar		Post-al. /Palatal		Velar		Glottal
Nasal		m		n					
Stop	p pʰ	b	t tʰ	d			k kʰ	ɡ	
Affricate			ts	(dz)	tʃ tʃʰ	dʒ			
Fricative	f	v	s	z	ʃ	(ʒ)	x ([χ]?)		h
Approximant				l		j			
Trill				r	ɽr				

The sound conventionally designated ř had originated from Indo-Aryan retroflex stops and appears to have still been a retroflex ([ɽr]) in Early Romani, judging from a retroflex reflex preserved in at least one dialect and from the diversity of reflexes in different dialects, which include geminated apical trills [rː]. Nonetheless, Yaron Matras also considers it possible that Early Romani had already shifted the place of articulation to a uvular, i.e. had acquired the modern Kalderash pronunciation [ʁ]. On the other hand, the possibility has also been entertained that there may still have been not just one, but several retroflexes in Early Romani, including a nasal and a lateral.

Dentals may have been allophonically palatalised before /i/.

The following Latin letters are used in this article to designate sounds in ways different from the IPA symbols:

letter	c	č	čh	kh	ph	ř	š	ž
phoneme in IPA	/ts/	/tʃ/	/tʃʰ/	/kʰ/	/pʰ/	/ɽr/	/ʃ/	/ʒ/

=== Stress ===
Stress was on the final syllable in the native lexical stratum (čhavó 'boy'), except that certain suffixes were not counted as part of the word for the purposes of stress placement, so the stress was placed before them instead (čhavés-ke 'for the boy'). These were the Layer II case markers (e.g. -ke, 'for'), the vocative markers, the present/future marker -a and the remoteness marker -asi. The mediopassive suffix did not receive stress either, e.g. díkh-jol 'is seen'. The special behaviour of these suffixes was due the fact that they had originally been independent words. In addition, original compound verbs ending in -d- 'to give' had stress on the original first compound member (váz-dav 'I lift'). In the foreign lexical component, words could be stressed on any syllable in accordance with the pronunciation in the source language (fóros 'town'), but when native suffixes were added, the stems received final stress like native stems (forós-ke 'for the town').

== Notable morphonological processes ==
The consonant /s/ appears to have exhibited an optional alternation with /h/ in certain morphemes in Early Romani, a variation pattern inherited from late Middle Indo-Aryan. These must have included the 2nd singular ending -es when followed by the suffix -a (producing -eha alongside the older -esa), and, due to analogy, the 1st plural ending -as in front of -a (producing -aha alongside the older -asa), the instrumental plural case ending after vowels (-V-ha alongside older -V-sa) and the copula having variants beginning in h- alongside the older s-. Many dialects have extended this pattern to many more forms and have generalised the /h/ variants, whereas others have only retained the conservative forms with /s/ without any trace of the alternation.

The vowel /i/ was desyllabified to a semivowel /j/ before a vowel-initial suffixes: sg. buti 'work' - pl. butja.

== Grammar ==
The morphology exhibited a split between two strata - native (including both inherited words and loans from before the immigration into the Byzantine Empire) and foreign (predominantly loans from Byzantine Greek and some from Slavic; later borrowings from other languages also join this group in descendant dialects). Words of the two strata were often formed and declined somewhat differently.

=== Nominal morphology ===
Early Romani nominals had two genders, masculine and feminine, two numbers - singular and plural, and eight cases - nominative, accusative (oblique), vocative, dative, ablative, locative, instrumental and genitive. The nominal phrases also expressed definiteness by means of a definite article.

Partly like other Modern Indo-Aryan languages, the grammatical morphemes in Romani noun declension are classified into three layers - Layer I (remainders of Old Indo-Aryan inflectional endings), Layer II (a set of originally separate words turned into new postposed inflectional elements) and Layer III (adpositions). Layer I suffixes are portmanteau morphs that simultaneously express case (nominative, oblique or vocative) and number, have different variants according to the gender of the word and exhibit some unpredictable lexical variation that makes it possible to speak of declension classes. Layer II suffixes express only case and have largely the same form.

==== Layer I ====
The most common endings can be summarised as follows:

		nominative singular	nominative plural	oblique singular	oblique plural	vocative singular	vocative plural
native	masculine	-o	-e	-es	-en	-éja	-ále
native	masculine	-∅	-a	-es	-en	-a	-ále
native	feminine	-i/-∅	-a	-a	-en	-e	-ále
foreign	masculine	-Vs	-i (but -ja if V = i)	-Vs	-en	-Vna, -V	-ále
foreign	feminine	-a	-a?	-a	-en	-o?	-ále

Native feminine stems had a tendency to exhibit /j/ in front of the vowel of the suffix outside of the nominative singular: -j-a, -j-en etc. This was always the case if the nominative singular ended in -i.

The following is a complete list of Early Romani declension classes largely as reconstructed by Viktor Elšík (with terminology adapted for this article):

stratum	gender	stem type	type	nominative singular	nominative plural	oblique singular	oblique plural	vocative singular	vocative plural	example
native	masculine	zero-stem	main type	-∅	-a	-es	-en	-a	-ále	kher 'house'
native	masculine	zero-stem	-ipen/ibe(n)	-∅	-a	-as*	-en	---	---	čačipen 'truth'
native	masculine	zero-stem	zero plural (exceptional)	-∅	-∅	-es	-en	---	---	vast 'hand'
native	masculine	o-stem		-o	-e	-es	-en	-éja	-ále	šero 'head'
native	masculine	i-stem		-i	-j-a	-j-es	-j-en	---	---	pani 'water'
native	feminine	zero-stem	non-jotating	-∅	-a	-a	-en	-e	-ále	džuv 'louse'
native	feminine	zero-stem	jotating	-∅	-j-a	-j-a	-j-en	-e	-j-ále	suv 'needle'
native	feminine	i-stem		-i	-j-a	-j-a	-j-en	-ije	-j-ále	piri 'pot'
foreign	masculine	o-stem		-o(s)**	-i (-a)	-os***	-en	-ona?	-ále?	foros 'town'
foreign	masculine	u-stem		-u(s)**	-i (-a)	-us	-en	-u?	-ále?	papus 'grandfather'
foreign	masculine	i-stem		-i(s)**	-j-a	-is	-en	-i(na)?	-j-ále?	sapunis 'soap'
foreign	feminine	a-stem		-a	-es?	-a	-en	-o?	-ále?	cipa 'skin'

* - The stems formed with the suffixes -ipen and -ibe(n) dropped the -e- before endings: oblique -ipn-as, -ibn-as, nominative plural -ipn-a, -ibn-a.

** - In foreign-stratum masculine words in -o(s), -u(s), -i(s), the variants of the nominative without -s found in some dialects might be due to a late reinterpretation of the -s as an oblique ending by analogy with native stratum words. However, the forms without -s might be original in words that were of neuter gender in Greek such as kókalo 'bone', since these, too, were adapted as masculine words in Romani. Present-day dialects have either only the forms with -s or only the forms without -s, but if the latter interpretation is correct, then both rules would be the result of a later generalisation. Note, moreover, that originally neuter Greek words like kókalo also seem to have retained a Greek plural in -a: kókala 'bones'.

*** - However, the oblique form of the abstract nouns formed with the suffix -im-o ended in -im-as. They retained a Greek plural in -im-ata.

==== Layer II ====
The Layer II suffixes are added to the appropriate Layer I oblique case form. After the plural oblique Layer I suffix ending in /n/, the initial voiceless consonant of the suffixes became voiced and the sibilant turned into an affricate. The forms were as follows:

case	main form	form after /n/
dative	-ke	-ge
locative	-te	-de
ablative	-tar	-dar
instrumental	-sa	-ca
genitive	-ker-	-ger-

The genitive took the inflectional endings of adjectives and agreed with the modified noun: -ker-o, -ker-e, etc (an example of Suffixaufnahme). The genitive suffix may also have had an optional short variant -k-/-g- besides -ker-/-ger-, as seen in several modern dialects, with or without a difference in function. If there was a difference, the long form may have been more emphatic and preferred when genitives were placed after the noun or nominalised.

==== Layer III ====
Layer III words in Early Romani were prepositions (as they mostly are in contemporary dialects as well). Some inherited prepositions were andar 'out of', andre 'in(to)', angle 'in front of', astjal 'for, because of', dži 'until', karig 'towards', (ka)tar 'from', ke 'at, to', mamuj 'against', maškar 'between', pal 'behind', paš 'next to, by', perdal 'across, through', te 'at, to', tel 'under', truja(l) 'past, around', upral/opral 'from the top of', upre/opre 'above, on, over', and vaš 'for'. The pairs andre-andar, angle-anglal, ke/te-katar/tar formed locative-ablative pairs, but there were no special directive prepositions - the locative ones were used to express direction as well. Certain prepositions ending in vowels dropped them before the definite article: e.g. ke- + -o > ko.

==== Case use ====
The bare oblique case was used:

1. as an accusative (direct object) case with animate nouns (as well as with pronouns), whereas inanimate nouns used the nominative.

2. It was also used to express possession: man si kher 'I have a house'.

3. Further, it expressed the indirect object of the verb 'to give', i.e. functioned as a dative case.

The instrumental was used also as a comitative case, meaning 'together with' as well as 'by means of'.

Adjuncts to almost all prepositions required the noun to be in the locative case, at least if animate, but may have taken the nominative case if inanimate, as commonly found in modern dialects. However, bi 'without' took the genitive and vaš 'for' took the dative.

==== Adjective declension ====
Adjectives used attributively or predicatively were normally declined as follows:

	nominative singular masculine	nominative singular feminine	nominative plural	oblique singular masculine	oblique singular feminine	oblique plural	vocative	examples
native	-o	-i	-e	-e	-a	-e	-e	baro 'big'
foreign	-o	-o	-a	-on-e	-on-a	-on-e	-e	zeleno 'green'

A small group of adjectives such as šukar 'pretty' ended in a consonant and were indeclinable.

Nominalised adjectives were declined like nouns: e.g. e phures-ke 'for the old one'.

The comparative and superlative were expressed by the form constructed with the suffix -eder.

==== Pronouns ====
The personal pronouns were:

	nominative emphatic	nominative non-emphatic	oblique	possessive
1st singular	me		man	minř- (< mir-?)
2nd singular	tu		tut	tir-
3rd singular masculine	ov (av)	lo (to)	(o)les	(o)les-ker-
3rd singular feminine	oj (aj)	li (ti)	(o)la	(o)la-ker-
reflexive	---		pes	pes-ker- (or possibly pinř-)
1st plural	amen		amen-	amar-
2nd plural	tumen		tumen-	tumar-
3rd plural	ol (*al), on	le (te)	(o)len-	(o)len-ger-

The possessive forms inflected and agreed with the modified noun like adjectives: tir-o, tir-i, tir-e, etc. In the 3rd person, there were two sets of nominative forms - the emphatic and the non-emphatic pronouns, the latter being commonly used anaphorically and encliticised. The reflexive was used only in the third person.

The demonstrative pronouns had a four-term system that contrasted deictic use (for immediately present referents, expressed by the vowel a) and anaphoric use (for discussed referents, expressed by the vowel o), as well as plain use (for normal indication, expressed by the consonant d) and specific use (for emphasis and contrast with other referents, expressed by the consonant k). The inflection pattern in the nominative was somewhat unique. The forms were as follows (sources differ on whether the consonants in parentheses were present):

	nominative singular masculine	nominative singular feminine	nominative plural	oblique singular masculine	oblique singular feminine	oblique plural
proximate plain	ada-va	ada-ja	ada-la	ada-le(s)	ada-la	ada-le(n)
proximate specific	aka-va	aka-ja	aka-la	aka-le(s)	aka-la	aka-le(n)
remote plain	odo-va	odo-ja	odo-la	odo-le(s)	odo-la	odo-le(n)
remote specific	oko-va	oko-ja	oko-la	oko-le(s)	oko-la	oko-le(n)

In addition, the following more archaic and simpler demonstrative forms must have still had some limited (less emphatic) use in Early Romani, since they are preserved in various dialects and even retain the default function in Epiros Romani to this day:

	nominative singular masculine	nominative singular feminine	nominative plural	oblique singular masculine	oblique singular feminine	oblique plural
proximate	a-va	a-ja	a-la	a-les	a-la	a-len
remote	o-va	o-ja	o-la	o-les	o-la	o-len

Corresponding adverbs were adaj 'here', odoj 'there', akaj 'precisely here' and okoj 'precisely there'. A related temporal adverb was akana 'now'. 'Such' was asav-.

Interrogative pronouns were kon (obl. kas-) 'who', kaj 'where' (katar 'where from?'), kana 'when', so 'what', sav- 'which, what sort of' (declined as an adjective), sar 'how' and keti 'how much'. For 'why' the dative of so was used: sos-ke. There may also have been an interrogative kibor 'how big'. The interrogatives could also be used as relative pronouns, especially kaj, which also occurred in the sense of 'which' as well as 'where' and thus as a more or less general 'subordinator' and 'relativiser' of clauses (as well as in the sense of 'that' as a complementiser: 'I think that ...').

Indefinite pronouns could be formed in several ways. The word kaj (rarely daj) 'some, any' could be preposed to other expressions to express indefiniteness (e.g. kaj-jekh 'anyone > anybody', kaj-či 'anything'). The word či 'something, anything' could apparently be postposed to other expressions (still retaining the same meaning), as seen in kaj-či and kaj-ni-či 'anything'. So could, possibly, an indefinite particle -ni, as seen in kaj-ni 'wherever' and in kaj-ni-či. The postposed particle -moni expressed free-choice indefinite constructions such as kon-moni 'whoever', či-moni 'whatever', kajmoni 'wherever'. Finally, there may have been a preposed particle vare-, which had been borrowed from Romanian - unusually for Early Romani - and was added to interrogative pronouns: vare-so 'something'.

Totality was expressed by the particle sa 'everything, all, always', savořo 'all' and the Slavic-derived vsako 'every'.

==== Definite article ====
Early Romani had a definite article, which was also used, as in Greek, with proper nouns and to express generic reference in various constructions (e.g. content or origin, lit. 'made out of the X'). The exact forms are difficult to reconstruct due to great dialectal variation. According to Yaron Matras' account, the Early Romani forms were:

nominative singular masculine	nominative singular feminine	nominative plural	oblique singular masculine	oblique singular feminine	oblique plural
o (< *ov)	i (< *oj) or e	ol	(o)le	(o)la	(o)le

The numeral jekh 'one' could be used to express indefiniteness, but its use was not obligatory.

==== Numerals ====
The numerals from 1 to 10 were:

1	2	3	4	5	6	7	8	9	10
jekh	duj	trin	štar	pandž	šov	efta	oxto	enja	deš

The teens were formed according to the pattern 'ten-and-unit' using the conjunction -u- 'and' borrowed from an Iranian language, little used elsewhere in Early Romani: e.g. deš-u-trin for 13, except for teens containing the Greek-derived units 7, 8 and 9: thus deš-efta for 17. Thus:

11	12	13	14	15	16	17	18	19
deš-u-jekh	deš-u-duj	deš-u-trin	deš-u-štar	deš-u-pandž	deš-u-šov	deš-efta	deš-oxto	deš-enja

Of the tens, 30 and probably 40 and 50 were borrowed into Early Romani from Greek, while the others were formed with native roots, mostly with the morpheme -var meaning 'times', i.e. 'X times 10':

10	20	30	40	50	60	70	80	90	100
deš	biš	trianda	saranda	peninda	šov-var-deš	efta-var-deš	oxto-var-deš	enja-var-deš	šel

Combinations of tens between 30 and 90 and single digits were formed not with -u- but with thaj 'and' (the usual Romani conjunction with that meaning): trianda-thaj-jekh for 31, if a conjunction was used at all. The combinations with biš (20) also used -thaj- according to Peter Bakker, while Viktor Elšík and Yaron Matras consider -u- to be a possibility as well.

The native cardinal numerals, namely the ones for 1-6, 10, 20 and 100, inflected in modifier position like adjectives ending in a consonant: e.g. deš-e 'ten (oblique)'. The Greek-derived ones (7-9 and 30-50) did not.

Ordinal numerals, apart from avgo 'first', were regularly derived from the cardinals with the suffix -to: e.g. efta-to 'seven-th' and even duj-to 'second'; the word for third may have been slightly had the slightly irregular form tri-to due to Greek influence. The ordinals in -to were declined as foreign-stratum adjectives.

Multiplicatives were formed with -var 'times': trin-var 'three times'. Half was paš.

=== Verbal morphology ===
The Early Romani verb inflected in tense (including aspect) and mood and agreed with the subject (and possibly the object) in person, number and sometimes gender. The basic structure of the Early Romani verb could be summarised with the following verb chain (note that not all slots need to be occupied):

stem				inflectional suffixes	
1	2	3	4	5	6
root	loan-adaption marker	valency markers	past stem marker	person & number agreement and tense	remoteness and modality

For the stem-forming suffixes in slots 2-3, see the section on Word Formation below.

==== Stems ====
Each verb had two stems: a present (imperfective) one and a past (perfective) one.

The overwhelming majority of present stems ended in a consonant (e.g. ker- 'do') and some could consist only of a consonant (e.g. l- 'take'), while a small number ended in a vowel, which was normally /a/, e.g. xa- 'eat').

The past stems, which were originally the Old Indo Aryan past participles, were usually formed by adding one of several suffixes to the present stem. Usually, they were:

1. after vowels: -l-; e.g. xa-l- 'eat'
2. after /v/ and the voiced dental sonorants /r/, /l/ and /n/: -d-; e.g. ker-d- 'do'
3. after other consonants (e.g. /kʰ/, /tʃ/, /s/, /ʃ/): -t-; e.g. dikh-t- 'see', beš-t- 'sit'
4. in motion verbs (av- 'come', ačh- 'stay', ušt- 'stand'): -il-, e.g. av-il- 'come'
5. if the present stem was formed with the mediopassive suffix -jov-, that suffix was replaced by -il-, e.g. ker-d-jov- > ker-d-(j)-il- 'be done'
6. in foreign-stratum intransitive verbs: -il-: -is-áv-il- > -is-á-jl-
7. after roots consisting of a single consonant (including original compounds ending in -d- 'give'): variably -in- or -∅-: d-in- or d- 'give'
8. In verbs expressing psychological state ending in /a/: variably -n-, -n-il-, -n-d-il-, etc.: dara-n/nil/ndil- 'fear'.

After /m/, the original -t- may have begun to be gradually replaced by -l- already in Early Romani, as it is replaced after other consonants as well in many descendant dialects.

Irregular alternations between the past and the present stem were found in dža- : gel- 'go', kal- : klist 'raise', mer- : mul- 'die', per- : pel- 'fall', rov- : run- 'cry', sov- : sut- 'sleep'. The pair ov- : ul- 'become, be' was due to a contraction of the regular ov-il- to ul-).

The copula varied between using the stem s-/h- and the extended s/h-in- in the present tense, according to some scholars, whereas others believe that the short forms are the original ones. However, it used suppletive stems in the subjunctive and future tense: usually ov- 'become' and occasionally av- 'come'. It can be said to also have a suppletive past stem ul-, although the regularly constructed imperfect forms (see below) could be used in a past sense.

==== Person and number agreement ====
The agreement markers used with the present and with the past stem were different: ker-av '(that) I make', but kerd-j-om 'I made'. The present agreement markers were as follows:

	singular	plural
1st person	-av	-as
2nd person	-es	-en
3rd person (native stratum)	-el	-en
3rd person (foreign stratum)	-i	-en

The initial vowel of the endings was omitted after verb stems ending in a vowel: xa-s '(that) you eat'.

The past agreement markers were as follows:

	singular	plural
1st person	-j-om	-j-am
2nd person	-j-al (-j-an)	-j-an
3rd person (transitive verbs)	-j-as	-e
3rd person (intransitive verbs, masculine)	-o	-e
3rd person (intransitive verbs, feminine)	-i	-e

The past agreement markers were preceded by -/j/- (1st sing. kerd-j-om 'I made', etc.) except for the endings of the 3rd person plural and intransitive singular -e, -o, and -i (e.g. 3rd pl. kerd-e 'they made'), which are, in fact, identical to the forms of the past participle. Like a participle, the intransitive singular ending agrees with the gender of the subject (masc. gel-o 'he went', fem. gel-i 'she went'). It is also thought possible that the element -in- may have occurred optionally before 3rd plural ending -e.

Exceptionally, the copula used the past agreement markers in the present tense: s-(in-j)-om 'I am', etc., except for the third person form, which was si for both numbers.

It has been speculated whether there might have been a set of 3rd person object agreement markers of the form -os 'him', -i 'her' and -e 'them' appended to the subject agreement markers (e.g. dikht-jas-os 'she saw him') and used in cases when there was no emphasis on the object. Such a system is preserved today in a single dialect, Epiros Romani, but is also similar to the ones found in Domari and the Dardic languages. However, a plausible phonetic development leading to this is not easy to reconstruct.

==== Tenses and moods ====
The last slot in the verb chain could be either empty or occupied by the present-future indicative particle -a or the remoteness particle -asi. By combining different stems and ending sets with different particles, the following forms were produced:

	-∅	indicative -a	remoteness -asi
present stem + present endings	Subjunctive (ker-él)	Present-Future (ker-él-a)	Imperfect (ker-él-asi)
past stem + past endings	Past (kerd-jás)	---	Pluperfect (kerd-jás-asi)

The Imperative consisted of the present stem alone in the singular (ker!) and coincided with the 2nd plural subjunctive for the plural (kerén!).

The Pluperfect apparently used the 'transitive' 3rd singular ending -jas before -asi even with intransitives (gel-jás-asi).

The Subjunctive was used in clauses expressing purpose, constructions expressing wishes and the like: te keráv 'that I do' (in function where many languages use an infinitive, a feature of the Balkan Sprachbund). The Past could be used to express a completed action in the future as well: dži kaj kerdjám 'until we have done it', so its meaning has been described as perfective and aspectual rather than temporal. The 'remote' tenses Imperfect and Plurperfect could also be used to express meanings such as conditional, hypothetical or counterfactual actions: te džanélasi 'if he knew it', mangdjómasi 'I would like to ask', te džandjásasi 'if he had known it'.

==== Non-finite forms ====
The past participle of native-stratum verbs consisted of the past stem and the usual adjective endings: kerd-o 'done', bešt-o 'seated, sitting'. The meaning was passive in transitive verbs. The past participle of foreign-stratum verbs ended in -(i)men, which was originally indeclinable.

There were two gerunds, both expressing actions simultaneous with that of the main verb:

The inflected gerund consisted of the present stem, the suffix -(i)nd- and adjective endings: ker-ind-o 'doing'. It had an inherently non-perfective meaning.

The non-inflected gerund consisted of the present stem and the suffix -i and was aspectually neutral: pučh-i 'having asked'.

There was no infinitive, instead the language used the finite subjunctive introduced by the complementiser particle te (which could also mean 'if'), and the subjunctive agreed with it in person and number: darava te vakerav 'I'm afraid to talk'.

==== Other expressions of modality ====
For ability, an impersonal verb was used: an inherited word ašti and the Persian šaj 'it is possible' appear to have co-existed. The negation was našti. Another view is that ašti is a later innovation produced in several dialects by analogy from našti.

For volition, the verb kam- 'to want' was used.

For necessity, the copula s- was inflected and combined with te and the subjunctive: ol si te soven 'they have to sleep', me s(inj)om te sovav 'I have to sleep'.

There were two negating particles: an indicative one, na, and a subjunctive-imperative one, ma: na sovela 'he doesn't sleep' vs ma sov 'don't sleep!' and ma te sovel 'may he not sleep!'. The copula is likely to have acquired a suppletive negative counterpart already in Early Romani: si 'is' vs (na)naj 'is not', although the original Early Romani form may have been the regular na si (> na-hi > naj).

== Word formation ==
Word formation was mostly suffixing.

=== Nominal suffixes ===
- There were two phonetically similar native-stratum suffixes forming abstract nouns: an originally deverbal -ibe, obl. -ibnas, pl. -ibna (mar-ibe 'strike-ing', 'fight') and an originally deadjectival -ipen, obl. -ipnas, pl. -ipna (barval-ipen 'rich-ness', 'wealth'). They may have been contaminated already in Early Romani period, with both occurring optionally with or without a final -n: -ibe(n), -ipe(n); at any rate, all of these variants occur in various dialects and none preserve the etymologically expected distribution of -n. Most, but not all modern dialects have also generalised one of the suffixes in both the deverbal and the deadjectival function.
- In the foreign stratum of the morphology, there was another suffix forming abstract nouns: -imo, obl. -imas, pl. -imata, e.g. xasar-imo 'lose-ing', 'loss'. It may be expected to have originally had a complementary distribution with the native suffixes -ibe and -ipe(n) in accordance with the origin of the stem, although present-day dialects use both with stems from either the native or foreign stratum.

There were also:

- a native diminutive suffix -oř- (with thematic endings), e.g. rakl-oř-o 'little boy'. In borrowed lexicon, the Slavic diminutive suffixes -ic- and -ka and the Greek -ela were used.
- a feminising suffix -ni (řom-ni 'Romani woman')
- a suffix forming names of trees -in (ambrol-in 'pear tree')
- a suffix forming names of objects -eli, -ali (mom-eli 'candle', from mom 'wax')
- a foreign-stratum agent noun suffix -ari (butari 'worker')
- Often, instead of new nouns, Romani would use lexicalised genitive phrases of the type dil-en-g-o-ro kher 'mental institution', lit. 'mad people's house'.

=== Adjectival suffixes and prefixes ===
- Adjectives were formed with various native suffixes ending in -no and '-lo: -alo, -valo, -no, -ano, -ikano, -uno, -utno, -avno, e.g. balo 'pig (noun)' - balikano 'pig (adj.)'. Only -no could also be used with borrowed stems.
- With foreign stems, the Greek suffix -itiko was used.
- The genitive also functioned (and declined) much like an adjective: bi-them-en-go-ro 'stateless'.
- There was also a prefix bi- 'without' or not: bi-baxt-alo 'luck-less', 'unlucky', bi-lačho 'not-good', 'bad'.

=== Adverbs ===
Locative adverbs (also used to express direction) could be formed by the addition of -e with original locative meaning (andr-e 'inside') and -al with original ablative meaning (andr-al 'from the inside > inside'). They often correspond to prepositions without these suffixes, or just coincide with them (with or without adverbial suffixes); see the Layer III section. Adverbs could also be formed from adjectives by adding -es. The following locative adverbs are reconstructed:

locative	andre	angle	avri	dur	mamuj	maškare	opre/upre	pale	paše	tele
meaning	'inside'	'in front'	'outside'	'faraway'	'beyond'	'in-between'	'above'	'behind'	'nearby'	'below'
ablative ('from')	andral	anglal	avrjal	dural	mamujal	maškaral	opral/upral	palal	pašal	telal

Among the other notable adverbs are the Greek-derived pale 'again', palpale 'back' tasja 'tomorrow', komi 'still' and panda 'still' < 'always'. Further, there were the inherited particles vi and nina meaning 'also, even' (vi... vi... could also be used as both ... and ...'), the Greek-derived moni 'only', as well as atoska 'then'.

=== Verbal suffixes ===
- Verbs could be formed from non-verbs by the addition of the verbs d- 'give' and ker- 'do': e.g. kan-d- 'to give ear', i.e. 'to listen', buti-ker- 'to do work', i.e. 'to work'. The second could also be added to verb roots to produce a causative meaning: mar-ker- 'to cause to beat'.
- There was an archaic, but still somewhat productive transitive/causative marker -av- (or -ev-) that formed causative verbs from other verbs, e.g. dar-av- ('to cause to fear', i.e. 'to frighten'), and transitive verbs from nouns gilj-av- ('to do a song', i.e. 'to sing').
- A factitive suffix forming transitive verbs from adjectives was -(j)ar- (or -er-, sometimes -al- after sibilants), e.g. bar-(j)ar- 'to make big', i.e. 'to grow, raise'. It could also be added to participles, resulting in a transitivising/causative meaning with respect to the corresponding verb, e.g. formations like beš-l-ar- 'to make seated', i.e. 'cause to sit, seat, set'.
- The transitivising suffixes -ar- and -ker- could also be combined to form -a(r)-ker-, again with a factitive and causative meaning.
- An intransitive marker -jov- (past stem allomorph -(j)il-), originating from the verb ov- 'to become', was added to the past stem of verbs, which was originally a past participle - or, in a few cases, to their roots - to produce a form with mediopassive meaning (ker-d-jov- 'be made', 'make oneself', hence 'become'). The same marker was also added to adjectives to produce a form with inchoative meaning (bar-jov- 'become big', i.e. 'grow'). When the marker -jov- was followed by the 3rd-person endings beginning in /e/ (sg. -el and pl. -en), the sequence -jov-e could optionally contract into -jo-: kerd-jov-el > kerd-jo-l 'makes oneself, is made, becomes'; pl. kerd-jov-en > kerd-jo-n. Apparently this contraction did not occur with the 2nd-person endings -es and -en in Early Romani, even though some present-day dialects have extended the rule to them.
- There also appears to have been a newer, competing intransitive marker -áv-, originating from the verb av- 'to come' (but nevertheless receiving the stress). The older intransitive marker -(j)ov- (past stem allomorph (j)il-) was obligatorily added to it (forming a combination meaning literally 'to become one that has come'). As a result, the present stem of such formations came to end in -av-ov-, and the past one in -av-il- > -ajl- or -a(n)dil-. For example, a verb such as dil-áv-ov- 'to become crazy' could be formed. The same suffix appears to have been added to the foreign verb adaptation marker -(V)s- (forming -(V)s-áv-ov-, past stem -(V)s-á(v)-il-, e.g. xa-s-áv- 'be lost'), and occurrence of these past stem forms in foreign stratum verbs in many dialects is the main reason to posit this marker already for Early Romani; otherwise, it is attested mostly in Vlax dialects.
- There was also a stative construction combining the past participle with a copula: si kerdo 'is done'.
- Foreign stratum verbs, which were mostly of Greek origin in Early Romani, were characterised by the addition of special loan adaptation marking suffixes. The most common ones appear to have been -Vn-, -Vz- and -Vs-, where V stands for the vowels /i/, /a/ or /o/. The distribution in Early Romani is disputed; most attested Romani dialects use only part of these suffixes, but also exhibit some differences between present and past stems and/or between transitive and intransitive verbs. Matras reconstructs a system in which -Vs- was used in all past stems as well as in the present stems of intransitive verbs, whereas -Vn- or -Vz- (depending on the source Greek verb) were used in the present stems of transitive verbs. Furthermore, the intransitives added the intransitive marker -áv-ov- (past stem allomorph -(V)s-á-jl- or -(V)s-ánd-il-), while the transitives used the transitive markers -ker- or -ar-. Thus, the system would have been as follows:

	Present	Past
Transitives	-(V)z-, -(V)n- + -ker/ar-	-Vs- + -ker-d-/-ar-d-
Intransitives	-(V)s- + -áv-	-Vs- + -á-jl/(n)dil-

== Conjunctions ==
Among coordinating conjunctions, there were thaj 'and' and vaj 'or', but it is impossible to reconstruct with certainty the word for 'but' due to later borrowings at least in all dialects that have dispersed outside of the former Byzantine territory. The conjunction u 'and' seems to have been used especially, but not only, in some numerals (see above). Important and multi-purpose subordinating conjunctions were te 'to', 'in order to', 'if', 'that' (for non-factual clauses) and kaj, originally 'where', but also a general marker of relative clauses 'that, which', as well as 'that' (for factual clauses).

== Syntax ==
The object was generally placed after the verb (VO), unless it was moved to the front of the clause for contrastive purposes, whereas the subject could either precede or follow the verb (SV or VS), with SV expressing emphasis on the subject or its prominence and VS signalling continuity. However, in clauses introduced by the conjunction te 'to, in order to, if', the verb followed immediately after te. Pronominal objects tended to be placed immediately after the verb, before other objects or subjects. Interrogative clauses did not differ from affirmative ones in their word order. Attributes, both adjectives, genitives, numerals and demonstratives were usually placed before the nouns they modified. The language used prepositions.

As already mentioned, possession was expressed with the possessor in the accusative: man si grast 'I have a horse'. There were also constructions with external possessors in the accusative: man dukhala o šero 'my head hurts'.

If the head noun of a dependent clause was not also its subject, it had to be 'duplicated' with a resumptive pronoun within the clause: o čhavo kaj dinjom les i čhuri 'the boy to whom I gave the knife'.

A typical Balkan Sprachbund syntactic feature of Early Romani was the contrast between two complementisers meaning 'that': a factual one kaj džala 'that he goes' and a non-factual one te džal 'that he go', 'to go'.

== Lexicon ==
Approximately 1000 lexical roots can be reconstructed as having been part of the Early Romani lexicon. Most of these, about 700, were inherited from the Indo-Aryan predecessor of Romani, around 200 were loanwords from Byzantine Greek, and around 100 were loanwords that had been acquired during the migration from India to the Byzantine Empire - approximately 70 from Iranian languages and 40 from Armenian. According to a different estimate, the Iranian and Armenian loans were as many as 200-250. It is likely that Early Romani freely used Greek words when necessary, much as its descendant Romani dialects resort, when needed, to the lexis of the majority languages in the areas where they are spoken.

== Correspondences between Early Romani and selected Romani dialects ==
The following are some examples of sound correspondences showing changes that have taken place in different dialects.

Early Romani	example	Sofia Erli	Arli	Drindari	Kalderaš	East Slovak	Sinti	Ruska Roma	Welsh Romani
*ř	*ařo 'flour'	r	r	[ɽr]	[ʁ]	r	r	r	r
*ndř	*mandřo 'bread'	[ɽr] > r	r	[ɽr]	[nʁ]	r, ndr	r	r	r
*čh	*čhavo 'boy'	čh	čh	čh	ś [ɕ]	čh	č	č	č
*dž	*džan- 'know'	dž > ž	dž	ž	ź [ʑ]	dž	dž	dž, ž	dž
*ti, *di	*dives 'day'	ti, di (but: tj, dj > kj, gj)	ti, di (but: tj > kj, č)	ci, zi	ki, gi (či, dži)	ťi, ďi (či, dži)	ti, di	ti, di	ti, di
*ki, *gi	*vogi 'soul'	ki, gi	ki, gi	ci, (d)zi	ki, gi	ťi, ďi (či, dži)	ki, gi	ki, gi	ki, gi
*ni	*pani 'water'	ni	ni	j(i)	j(i)/ni	ňi	ni	ni	ni
*li	*bokoli 'cake'	li	li	j(i)	li	ľi	li	li	li
*lj	*giljav- 'to sing'	lj	lj, jl	j	lj	ľ/j	j	lj/j	j
*-st/št	*grast 'horse'	-s/š	-s/š	-s/š	-st/št	-st/št	-st/št	-st/št	-st/št
*VsV in endings	*keresa 'you do'	VsV	VhV	VsV	VsV (VhV)	VhV	VhV	VsV	VsV
3rd sing. *-as	*kerdjas 'he did'	-as	-a	-as	-a	-as/a	-as	-a	-as

The following are some notable grammatical differences between dialects in comparison with the Early Romani condition.

Early Romani	example	Sofia Erli	Arli	Drindari	Kalderaš	East Slovak	Sinti	Ruska Roma	Welsh Romani
foreign masc. nom.sg.	*for-os, *kokal-o	-Vs	-V	-Vs	-V	-Vs	-V(s)	-V	-Vs
foreign masc. nom.pl.	*for-i	-ovja	-(j)a	-uja	-uri	-a	-i	-i (-ja)	-i
def. article nom.pl.	*ol	o	o	o/u	le, əl	o	i	none	o
def. article fem.obl.	*(o)la	e	e	e	(o)la, le	(o)la	i	none	i
3rd sing. masc. pronoun	*ov	ov	ov	ov	ou	jov	jov	jov	jov
present indicative	*kerel-a	-∅	-a	-a	-∅	-∅	-a/∅	-a/∅	-a/∅
subjunctive	*kerel-∅	= pres.ind.	-∅	-∅	= pres.ind.	= pres.ind.	-∅	-∅	-∅
future	*kerel-a	ka ...	ka ...	mə ...	-a, kame...	-a	none	l- te, av- te	dža- te
1st sg. past	*kerdj-om	-om	-om	-im	-em	-om	-om/um	-om	-om
2nd sg. past	*kerdj-al (-an)	-an	-an	-(e)an	-an	-al	-al	-an	-an
2nd pl. past	*kerdj-an	-en	-en	-(e)an	-an	-an	-an	-(n)e	-an
3rd sg. past intransitive	*gel-o	-o	-o	-o	-o	= trans.	= trans.	= trans.	= trans.
infinitive	none	none	none	none	none	= 3rd sg.	= 3rd sg.	none / 2,3 sg.	none
foreign verb (pres.trans.)	*-(V)z/n-ker/ar-	-in-	-in-	-iz-	-isar/i-	-in-	-ev/∅-	-in-	-as-, -in-
negation	*na ...	na ...	na ...	na ...	či ...	na ...	... gar	na ...	na ...
comparative	* -eder	-eder > po-	po-	po-	maj-	-eder	-eder/ester	-ydyr	-eder
superlative	* -eder	-eder > naj-	naj-	naj-	maj-	jekh ... -eder	-ester	-ydyr	buteder ...

== Sources ==
- Boretzky, Norbert & Birgit Igla (2004). Kommentierter Dialektatlas des Romani. Harrassowitz.
- Matras, Yaron (2002). Romani: A Linguistic Introduction. Cambridge University Press. ISBN 0-521-02330-0.
- Matras, Yaron (2004). Romacilikanes: The Romani dialect of Parakalamos. Romani Studies, Series 5, 14: 59-109.
- Elšík, Viktor & Yaron Matras (2006). Markedness and Language Change: The Romani Sample. Berlin: Mouton de Gruyter.
- Matras, Yaron & Anton Tenser (eds). (2020). The Palgrave Handbook of Romani Language and Linguistics. Palgrave Macmillan.
