= Gurbeti =

Ethnic group in Cyprus, Turkey and the Balkans

Languages
- Kurbet, Cypriot Turkish in Cyprus and North Cyprus, Vlax Romani, Albanian, Serbian and Balkan Gagauz Turkish in the Balkans

Religion
- Mostly Islam, Minority Serbian Orthodox Church

Gurbeti (also Kurbet or Kurbat or غربتی in Persian) are an ethnic group living in Turkey, Albania, Bulgaria, Kosovo, Serbia, and the former Yugoslavia whose members are predominantly Muslims with a minority being Eastern Orthodox Christians. The Gurbeti make up approximately two thirds of the population of Roma in Mačva, many of whom work in agriculture. In Kosovo, other Romani groups viewed the Gurbeti negatively.

== Muslim Gurbeti at Cyprus ==
In the 1960 Constitution of Cyprus, they were considered as part of the Turkish Cypriot community. Once the Gurbeti lived all over Cyprus. After 1975, with the Third Vienna Agreement they migrated, along with the majority of the Turkish Cypriots to Northern Cyprus. Immigration to the United Kingdom and Turkey has also taken place. They describe themselves as Turkish in terms of ethnicity and speak Kurbet language and Cypriot Turkish. In the 17th century, some migrated to Ottoman Rumelia. In the Republic of Cyprus, most live in the area of Agios Antonios in Limassol, and in the villages of Makounta, Stavrokonnou and Polis-Chrysochou in Paphos. Persons belonging to the Roma community remain social and economically marginalised despite some government efforts.

== Gurbeti in the Balkans ==
In Vuk Stefanović Karadžić's Serbian dictionary, the word Gurbet means "Gypsy foreign workers". The word is derived from Turkish gurbet, meaning "emigrate". The first mentions of nomadic Roma attributed as Gurbeti ancestors, from Ottoman Cyprus, is from the 17th century. In 1941, most of the Yugoslav Roma settled permanently, with the exception of the Gurbeti in Montenegro.

However, other sources about the Gurbeti have said that their Ancestors once came from Moldova and Wallachia, at the end of the 1850s after Slavery in Romania and settled in the Balkan, and speak a Vlax dialect.

In other parts of the Balkans like in Bulgaria, Albania, North Macedonia, Serbia, and Greece, the Gurbet are called Pečalbarstvo.

== Anatolia ==
Ottoman sources from 16th century mentioned a Turkoman clan named "Gurbet" who lived in Dulkadiroğlu, Kahramanmaraş, though Egemen Yılgür notes that the term is used for several unrelated communities, including Ghorbati and Abdals.

== Culture ==
The Gurbeti in the Balkans share some cultural features with the Kalderaš, but also with other Xoraxane, who adopted Turkish culture since the Ottoman time. The majority of Gurbeti are Cultural Muslims while others belong to the Serbian Orthodox Church, and partly assimilated into society. They speak Kurbet language and Cypriot Turkish in Northern Cyprus, and Vlax Romani language, Albanian language, Serbian language and Rumelian Turkish at the Balkans.

== Diaspora ==
There is a Gurbeti diaspora, such as in Austria and Germany; these were recent migrants, mostly Gastarbeiter unskilled workers, and have since integrated into Austrian and German society. Some of the Gurbeti men married Austrian and German women. The Host population did not see them as Roma, only as Yugoslavian.

== Language ==
Their Kurbet is a mixed language composed of Domari vocabulary and Cypriot Turkish grammar. In Kosovo, the Gurbeti speech have either a dominant Serbian substratum, or Albanian substratum. The Džambazi (Acrobatics and Horse trading) nomadic Muslim Romani group, speak a sub-dialect of Kurbet. The origin of the Romani loan words in Croatian are most likely from Gurbeti, who settled predominantly from Bosnia and Herzegovina.

== Genetics ==
While the Early Romani people traces back to the Indian subcontinent, also Gene flow from the Ottoman Turks spilled over and established a higher frequency of the Y-haplogroups J and E3b in Balkan Roma Groups. The Greek Doctor A. G. Paspati made the statement in his Book, that Turks married often Roma Woman. Greeks and Slavs DNA also influenced the Balkan Roma people. Also, the genetics of Peoples of the Caucasus influenced the Genetic impact of Roma people.
