= Kurbet language =

Domari–Cypriot Turkish creole

Kurbetcha
- Native to: Cyprus / North Cyprus
- Ethnicity: Gurbeti
- Language family: Domari language–Cypriot Turkish creole

Language codes
- ISO 639-3: None (mis)
- Glottolog: None

Kurbetcha (or Gurbetcha) is a creole language with what appears to be predominantly Domari language vocabulary and Cypriot Turkish grammar, spoken by the Gurbeti of Cyprus and North Cyprus. The Gurbetler have traditionally also spoken Cypriot Turkish. The Gurbetler of Ottoman Cyprus are of mixed ancestry. Muslim Dom people from Ottoman Syria settled there after Siege of Famagusta. The majority settled in the north after 1974. The language is not protected by the European Charter for Regional or Minority Languages, unlike Cypriot Maronite Arabic and Armenian.

Kurbetcha has been very little studied. A dissertation on its linguistics was done by Chryso Pelekani (2018). Children are not learning the language; it has been supplanted by Turkish in the north and Greek in the south.

== Phonology ==
=== Consonants ===
Consonants
		Bilabial	Labiodental	Alveolar	Postalveolar	Palatal	Velar	Glottal
Plosive	Voiceless	p		t			k	
Plosive	Voiced	b		d			g	
Affricate	Voiceless				t͡ʃ			
Affricate	Voiced				d͡ʒ			
Fricative	Voiceless		f	s	ʃ			
Fricative	Voiced		v	z	(ʒ)		ɣ	h
Nasal		m		n			ŋ	
Tap				ɾ				
Approximant						j		
Lateral approximant				l				

=== Vowels ===
Vowels
	Front		Back	
	[-round]	[+round]	[-round]	[+round]
High	i	y	ɨ̠	u
Mid	e	ø		o
Low			ɑ	

- Pelekani uses ⟨ɨ̠⟩ because "The [+high], [-front], [-round] vowel /ɨ̠/ is mainly realised as a close central unrounded vowel [ɨ]."

== See also ==
- Languages of Cyprus
