= Agios Antonios (Limassol) =

Quarter of Limassol Municipality

Coordinates: 34.6704°N 33.0398°E

Agios Antonios (Greek: Άγιος Αντώνιος, Turkish: Ayandon) is a district of the Municipality of Limassol.

== Location ==
To the east and north by the Tzami Tzentit district. The southern and western part of the district is by the sea. Most of the Limassol Marina is located in most of the district today.

== History ==
The district of Agios Antonios was created with the beginning of the Ottoman occupation in Cyprus, in 1571. It was a Turkish district. Over time, Greek Cypriots were added to the population, who after a while formed the majority.

In 1950, the properties of the residents of the district were expropriated in order to start the construction of a new port in the area (the district was adjacent to the old port of Limassol), which did not happen.

The population was greatly reduced. In addition, during the EOKA struggle, when the excellent relations between Greek Cypriots and Turkish Cypriots were disrupted, Greek Cypriots began to leave the district due to fear. The proximity of the district to the Turkish Cypriot district of Tzami Tzentit also contributed to this fact. The withdrawal of the Greek Cypriots began in 1956. Turkish Cypriots settled in the district, although they had been compensated for the expropriations. In the 1960s all the houses that were expropriated were demolished and the district was completely abandoned.

The church of the district, the church of Agios Antonios, was built in 1870, on the site of an older church. It first covered the needs of the Christians of their district of Agios Antonios and then of the districts of Tsiflikoudia and Agios Ioannis. In addition, in the district there is the chapel of Agios Georgios the Poor.

== Area Map ==
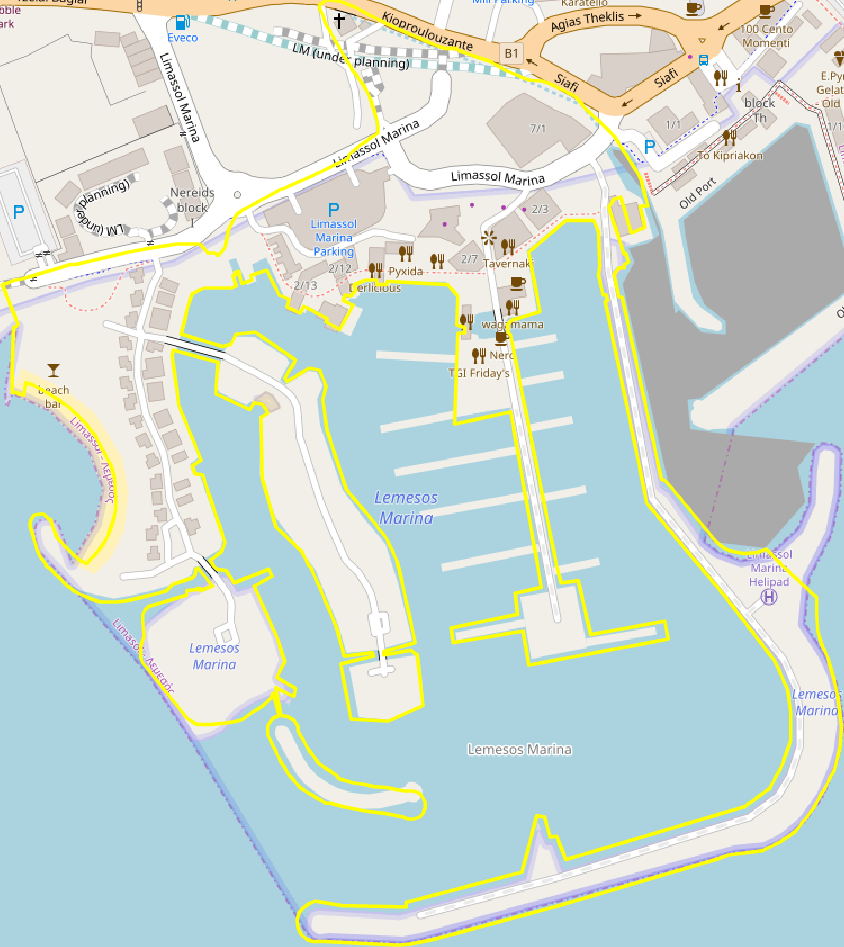
Map of area Agios Antonios in Limassol from 2018.
