= Cypriot Greek =

Modern Greek language variety spoken by Greek Cypriots

- κυπριακή ελληνική κυπριακά
- Pronunciation: [cipriaˈci elːiniˈci] [cipriaˈka]
- Native to: Cyprus; Rhodes, Greece
- Ethnicity: Greek Cypriots
- Native speakers: c. 700,000 in Cyprus (2011) (Note: This number includes speakers of all Greek varieties in Cyprus.)
- Language family: Indo-European: Hellenic; Greek; Attic–Ionic; Attic; Koine; Core; Southeastern; Cypriot Greek
- Writing system: Greek alphabet

Language codes
- ISO 639-3: –
- Glottolog: cypr1249
- Linguasphere: 56-AAA-ahg

Cypriot Greek (Greek: κυπριακή ελληνική, locally [cipriaˈci elːiniˈci] or κυπριακά [cipriaˈka]) is the variety of Modern Greek that is spoken by the majority of the Cypriot populace and Greek Cypriot diaspora. It is considered a divergent dialect as it differs from Standard Modern Greek (Note: Standard Modern Greek is the variety based on Demotic (but with elements of Katharevousa) that became the official language of Greece in 1976. See also: Greek language question.) in various aspects of its lexicon, phonetics, phonology, morphology, syntax and even pragmatics, not only for historical reasons but also because of geographical isolation, and extensive contact with typologically distinct languages.

== Classification ==
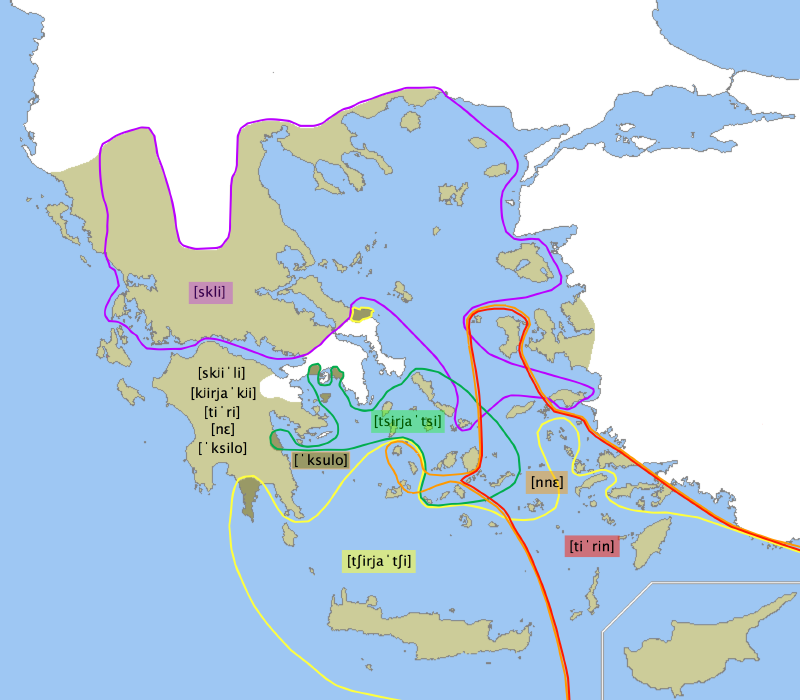
Some phonological phenomena Cypriot shares with varieties of the Aegean: word-initial gemination; word-final /n/; and palatalisation of /k/ to [t͡ʃ].

Cypriot Greek is not an evolution of ancient Arcadocypriot Greek, but derives from Byzantine Medieval Greek. It has traditionally been placed in the southeastern group of Modern Greek varieties, along with the dialects of the Dodecanese and Chios (with which it shares several phonological phenomena).

Though Cypriot Greek tends to be regarded as a dialect by its speakers, it is unintelligible to speakers of Standard Modern Greek without adequate prior exposure. Greek-speaking Cypriot society is diglossic, with vernacular Cypriot Greek (the "low" variety) and Standard Modern Greek (the "high" variety). Cypriot Greek is itself a dialect continuum with an emerging koine. Davy, Ioannou & Panayotou (1996) have argued that diglossia has given way to a "post-diglossic [dialectal] continuum [...] a quasi-continuous spread of overlapping varieties".

== History ==
Cyprus was cut off from the rest of the Greek-speaking world from the 7th to the 10th centuries AD due to Arab attacks. It was reintegrated in the Byzantine Empire in 962 to be isolated again in 1191 when it fell to the hands of the Crusaders. These periods of isolation led to the development of various linguistic characteristics distinct from Byzantine Greek.

The oldest surviving written works in Cypriot date back to the Medieval period. Some of these are: the legal code of the Kingdom of Cyprus, the Assizes of Jerusalem; the chronicles of Leontios Machairas and Georgios Boustronios; and a collection of sonnets in the manner of Francesco Petrarca. In the past hundred years, the dialect has been used in poetry (with major poets being Vasilis Michaelides and Dimitris Lipertis). It is also traditionally used in folk songs and τσιαττιστά (tsiattistá, battle poetry, a form of playing the Dozens) and the tradition of ποιητάρηες (poiitáries, bards).

Cypriot Greek had been historically used by some members of the Turkish Cypriot community, especially after the end of Ottoman control and consequent British administration of the island. In 1960, it was reported that 38% of the Turkish Cypriots were able to speak Greek along with Cypriot Turkish. Some Turkish Cypriots of Nicosia and Paphos were also speaking Cypriot Greek as their mother tongue according to early 20th century population records.

In the late 1970s, Minister of Education Chrysostomos A. Sofianos upgraded the status of Cypriot by introducing it in education. More recently, it has been used in music, e.g. in reggae by Hadji Mike and in rap by several Cypriot hip hop groups, such as Dimiourgoi Neas Antilipsis (DNA). Locally produced television shows, usually comedies or soap operas, make use of the dialect, for example with Vourate Geitonoi (βουράτε instead of τρέξτε) or Oi Takkoi (Τάκκος being a uniquely Cypriot name). The 2006 feature film Pirates of the Caribbean: Dead Man's Chest features actor Jimmy Roussounis arguing in Cypriot Greek with actor Nej Adamson speaking Cypriot Turkish about a captain's hat they find in the sea. Peter Polycarpou routinely spoke in Cypriot in his role as Chris Theodopolopoudos in the British television comedy series Birds of a Feather. In a July 2014 episode of the American TV series The Leftovers, Alex Malaos's character uses the dialect saying "Εκατάλαβα σε" ('I recognised you'). In the American mockumentary comedy horror television series What We Do in the Shadows, actress Natasia Demetriou, as the vampiric character Nadja, occasionally exclaims phrases in Cypriot.

Today, Cypriot Greek is the only other variety of Modern Greek apart from Standard Modern Greek with a significant presence of spontaneous use online, including blogs and internet forums, and there exists a variant of Greeklish that reflects its distinct phonology.

== Phonology ==
Studies of the phonology of Cypriot Greek are few and tend to examine very specific phenomena, e.g. gemination, "glide hardening". A general overview of the phonology of Cypriot Greek has ever been attempted only once, by Newton 1972, but parts of it are now contested.

=== Consonants ===
Cypriot Greek has geminate and palato-alveolar consonants, which Standard Modern Greek lacks, as well as a contrast between [ɾ] and [r], which Standard Modern Greek also lacks. The table below, adapted from Arvaniti 2010, p. 4, depicts the consonantal inventory of Cypriot Greek. Segments presumed to be non-contrastive (allophonic) are shown between parentheses.

			Labial	Dental/ Alveolar		Post- alveolar	Palatal	Velar
			Labial	plain	sibilant	Post- alveolar	Palatal	Velar
Nasal		short	m	n			(ɲ)	(ŋ)
Nasal		long	mː	nː				
Plosive/ Affricate	voiceless	short	p	t	t͡s	t͡ʃ	c	k
Plosive/ Affricate	voiceless	long	pʰː	tʰː		t͡ʃʰː	cʰː	kʰː
Plosive/ Affricate	voiced	short	(b)	(d)		(d͡ʒ)	(ɟ)	(g)
Fricative	voiceless	short	f	θ	s	ʃ		x
Fricative	voiceless	long	fː	θː	sː	ʃː		xː
Fricative	voiced	short	v	ð	z	ʒ	ʝ	ɣ
Fricative	voiced	long	vː	(ðː)	(zː)	(ʒː)	(ʝː)	(ɣː)
Approximant		short		l			(ʎ)	
Approximant		long		lː				
Vibrant		tap		ɾ				
Vibrant		trill		r				

Stops /p t c k/ and affricate /t͡ʃ/ are unaspirated and may be pronounced weakly voiced in fast speech. /pʰː tʰː cʰː kʰː/ are always heavily aspirated and they are never preceded by nasals, with the exception of some loans, e.g. /ʃamˈpʰːu/ "shampoo". /t͡ʃ/ and /t͡ʃʰː/ are laminal post-alveolars. /t͡s/ is pronounced similarly to /t͡ʃʰː/, in terms of closure duration and aspiration.

Voiced fricatives /v ð ɣ/ are often pronounced as approximants and they are regularly elided when intervocalic. /ʝ/ is similarly often realised as an approximant [j] in weak positions.

The palatal lateral approximant [ʎ] is most often realised as a singleton or geminate lateral [ʎ(ː)] or a singleton or geminate fricative [ʝ(ː)], and sometimes as a glide [j] (cf. yeísmo). The circumstances under which all the different variants surface are not very well understood, but [ʝ(ː)] appear to be favoured in stressed syllables and word-finally, and before /a e/. Pappas 2009 identifies the following phonological and non-phonological influencing factors: stress, preceding vowel, following vowel, position inside word; and sex, education, region, and time spent living in Greece (where [ʎ] is standard). Arvaniti 2010 notes that speakers of some local varieties, notably that of Larnaca, "substitute" the geminate fricative for /ʎ/, but Pappas 2009 contests this, saying that, "[ʝ(ː)] is robustly present in the three urban areas of Lefkosia, Lemesos and Larnaka as well as the rural Kokinohoria region, especially among teenaged speakers ... the innovative pronunciation [ʝ(ː)] is not a feature of any local patois, but rather a supra-local feature."

The palatal nasal [ɲ] is produced somewhat longer than other single nasals, though not as long as geminates. /z/ is similarly "rather long".

/x/ before /a/ is [h]

The alveolar trill /r/ is the geminate counterpart of the tap /ɾ/.

==== Palatalisation and glide hardening ====
In analyses that posit a phonemic (but not phonetic) glide /j/, palatals and postalveolars arise from CJV (consonant–glide–vowel) clusters, namely:

- /mjV/ → [mɲV]
- /njV/ → [ɲːV]
- /ljV/ → [ʎːV] or [ʝːV]
- /kjV/ → [t͡ʃV] or [cV]
- /xjV/ → [ʃV] or [çV]
- /ɣjV/ → [ʝV]
- /zjV/ → [ʒːV]
- /t͡sjV/ → [t͡ʃʰːV]
- /sjV/ → [ʃːV]

The glide is not assimilated, but hardens to an obstruent [c] after /p t f v θ ð/ and to [k] after /ɾ/. At any rate, velar stops and fricatives are in complementary distribution with palatals and postalveolars before front vowels /e i/; that is to say, broadly, /k kʰː/ are palatalised to either [c cʰː] or [t͡ʃ t͡ʃʰː]; /x xː/ to [ç çː] or [ʃ ʃː]; and /ɣ/ to [ʝ].

==== Geminates ====
There is considerable disagreement on how to classify Cypriot Greek geminates, though they are now generally understood to be "geminates proper" (rather than clusters of identical phonemes or "fortis" consonants). Geminates are 1.5 to 2 times longer than singletons, depending, primarily, on position and stress. Geminates occur both word-initially and word-medially. Word-initial geminates tend to be somewhat longer. Tserdanelis & Arvaniti 2001 have found that "for stops, in particular, this lengthening affects both closure duration and VOT", but Davy & Panayotou 2003 claim that stops contrast only in aspiration, and not duration. Armosti 2010 undertook a perceptual study with thirty native speakers of Cypriot Greek, and has found that both closure duration and (the duration and properties of) aspiration provide important cues in distinguishing between the two kinds of stops, but aspiration is slightly more significant.

==== Assimilatory processes ====
Word-final /n/ assimilates with succeeding consonants—other than stops and affricates—at word boundaries producing post-lexical geminates. Consequently, geminate voiced fricatives, though generally not phonemic, do occur as allophones. Below are some examples of geminates to arise from sandhi.

- /ton ˈluka/ → [to‿ˈlˑuka] τον Λούκα "Lucas" (acc.)
- /en ˈða/ → [e‿ˈðːa] εν δα "[s/he] is here"
- /pu tin ˈɾiza/ → [pu ti‿ˈriza] που την ρίζα "from the root"

In contrast, singleton stops and affricates do not undergo gemination, but become fully voiced when preceded by a nasal, with the nasal becoming homorganic. This process is not restricted to terminal nasals; singleton stops and affricates always become voiced following a nasal.

- /kaˈpnizumen ˈpuɾa/ → [kaˈpnizumem‿ˈbuɾa] καπνίζουμεν πούρα "[we] smoke cigars"
- /an ˈt͡ʃe/ → [an‿ˈd͡ʒe] αν τζ̌αι "even though"
- /tin ciɾi.aˈcin/ → [tiɲ‿ɟirĭ.aˈcin] την Κυριακήν "on Sunday"

Word-final /n/ is altogether elided before geminate stops and consonant clusters:

- /eˈpiasamen ˈfcoɾa/ → [eˈpcasame‿ˈfcoɾa] επιάσαμεν φκιόρα "[we] bought flowers"
- /ˈpa‿stin cʰːeˈlːe/ → [ˈpa‿sti‿cʰːeˈlːe] πα' στην κκελλέ "on the head"

Like with /n/, word-final /s/ assimilates to following [s] and [ʃ] producing geminates:

- /as ʃoˈnisi/ → [a‿ʃːoˈnisi] ας σ̌ονίσει "let it snow"

Lastly, word-final /s/ becomes voiced when followed by a voiced consonant belonging to the same phrase, like in Standard Greek:

- /tis ˈmaltas/ → [tiz‿ˈmaltas] της Μάλτας "of Malta"
- /aˈɣonas ˈðromu/ → [aˈɣonaz‿ˈðromu] αγώνας δρόμου "race"

=== Vowels ===
The vowels of Cypriot Greek. Adapted from Arvaniti 1999, p. 4.

	Front	Central	Back
Close	i		u
Mid	e̞		o̞
Open		ɐ	

Cypriot Greek has a five-vowel system /i, u, e, o, a/ that is nearly identical to that of Standard Modern Greek. (Note: For an acoustic comparison of the two vowel systems see Themistocleous 2017a and Themistocleous 2017b.)

Close vowels /i u/ following /t/ at the end of an utterance are regularly reduced (50% of all cases presented in study) to "fricated vowels" (40% of all cases, cf. Slavic yers), and are sometimes elided altogether (5% of all cases).

In glide-less analyses, /i/ may alternate with [k] or [c], e.g. [kluvi] "cage" → [klufca] "cages", or [kulːuɾi] "koulouri" → [kulːuɾ̥ka] "koulouria"; and, like in Standard Modern Greek, it is pronounced [ɲ] when found between /m/ and another vowel that belongs to the same syllable, e.g. [mɲa] "one" (f.).

=== Stress ===
Cypriot Greek has "dynamic" stress. Both consonants and vowels are longer in stressed than in unstressed syllables, and the effect is stronger word-initially. There is only one stress per word, and it can fall on any of the last four syllables. Stress on the fourth-last syllable in a word is rare and normally limited to certain verb forms. Because of that possibility, however, when words with antepenultimate stress are followed by an enclitic in Cypriot Greek, no extra stress is added unlike Standard Modern Greek in which stress falls only on one of the last three syllables), e.g. Cypriot Greek το ποδήλατον μου [to poˈðilato‿mːu], Standard Modern Greek το ποδήλατό μου [to poˌðilaˈto‿mu] "my bicycle".

== Grammar ==
An overview of syntactic and morphological differences between Standard Modern Greek and Cypriot Greek can be found in Hadjioannou, Tsiplakou & Kappler 2011, pp. 568–9.

Cypriot Greek is known for having a more conservative grammatical system than Standard Modern Greek. One of the most distinctive conservative features of Cypriot Greek is the preservation of older verb forms and aspectual distinctions that have been lost in the standard language. For instance, where Standard Modern Greek uses a single form έκανε for both the simple past "he did" and the past continuous "he was doing", Cypriot Greek maintains a clear morphological distinction: έκαμεν "he did" and έκαμνεν "he was doing". This mirrors Classical Ancient Greek, which similarly distinguished ἔκαμεν and ἐκάμνεν for those respective meanings. These distinctions are still actively used in spoken Cypriot today, showcasing the dialect's conservative grammatical structure.

Another example is the third person plural present tense form. Where Standard Modern Greek uses κάνουν "they do", Cypriot Greek preserves the older form κάμνουσιν, identical to the Classical Attic Greek κάμνουσιν. This ουσιν ending, now archaic or lost in most other varieties of Greek, remains productive in the Cypriot dialect, further illustrating its retention of ancient morphological patterns.

== Vocabulary ==
More loanwords are in everyday use than in Standard Modern Greek, largely because Standard Greek, now the official language of Cyprus, introduced many foreign borrowings into the island. In addition to these shared influences, Cypriot Greek also preserves a number of unique, locally developed loanwords from Old French, Italian, Occitan, and, increasingly, English. As a result, the vocabulary of Cypriot Greek is broader and more varied, drawing from both the standard and its own historical linguistic layers. Despite this lexical diversity, the dialect as a whole is more conservative than Standard Modern Greek, especially in terms of verbs, grammar and certain archaisms. For example, Cypriot Greek retains older forms such as πόθεν for “from where?”, an equivalent of the archaic English “whence.” Many everyday words also differ, such as συντυχάννω alongside μιλώ "I talk" and θωρώ in place of βλέπω "I look".

Some Arabic expressions, such as μάσ̌σ̌αλλα [ˈmaʃːalːa] "mashallah" and ίσ̌σ̌αλλα [ˈiʃːalːa] "inshallah", are sometimes used in Cypriot Greek. Ethnologue reports that the lexical similarity between Cypriot Greek and Demotic Greek is in the range of 84–93%.

== Orthography ==
There is no established orthography for Cypriot Greek. Efforts have been made to introduce diacritics to the Greek alphabet to represent palato-alveolar consonants found in Cypriot, but not in Standard Modern Greek, e.g. the combining caron ⟨ˇ⟩, by the authors of the "Syntychies" lexicographic database (Note: Archived 2021-04-13 at the Wayback Machine) at the University of Cyprus. When diacritics are not used, an epenthetic ⟨ι⟩—often accompanied by the systematic substitution of the preceding consonant letter—may be used to the same effect (as in Polish), e.g. Standard Modern Greek παντζάρι [paˈ(n)d͡zaɾi] → Cypriot Greek ππαντζιάρι [pʰːaˈnd͡ʒaɾi], Standard Modern Greek χέρι [ˈçeɾi] → Cypriot Greek σιέρι [ˈʃeɾi].

Geminates (and aspirates) are represented by two of the same letter, e.g. σήμμερα [ˈsimːeɾa] "today", though this may not be done in cases where the spelling would not coincide with Standard Modern Greek's, e.g. σήμμερα would still be spelt σήμερα. (Note: Geminates are present in Cypriot Greek and were present (and distinct) in Ancient and earlier Koine, but they are not in Standard Modern Greek. Late twentieth-century spelling reforms in Greece were not indiscriminate, i.e. some words are still spelt with two consecutive consonant letters, but are not pronounced that way. In addition, Cypriot Greek has developed geminates in words where they were not previously found.)

Despite the centuries-long existence of Greek Cypriot literature, the dialect wasn't widely written until the rise of computer-mediated communication in the 2000s. Online and in text messaging, Cypriot Greek, like Standard Modern Greek, is commonly written in the Latin script, and English spelling conventions may be adopted for shared sounds, e.g. ⟨sh⟩ for /ʃ/ (and /ʃː/).

== Some comparisons between Cypriot Greek and Standard Greek ==
Cypriot Greek demonstrates a prevalence of archaic elements. The following comparisons provide a visual representation of this phenomenon.

The tables below do not imply that they were written down the same in Attic Greek but it is simply using the modern Greek alphabet's pronunciation system applied on attic Greek for comparison purposes.

The classical attic Greek X was pronounced as an aspirated Κ similar to the English K. Θ = aspirated Τ, Γ = ΓΚ/ΓΓ and Β = ΜΠ. In classical attic Greek Η was pronounced a long Ε and not like the modern Greek I, Y

Standard	Classical Attic pronunciation
Χ [x]	kʰ
Θ [θ]	tʰ
Γ [ɣ]	ΓΚ [g]
Β [v]	ΜΠ [b]
Η [i]	ΕΕ [ɛː]

Consonant pronunciation
Standard	Cypriot	Classical Attic pronunciation
άργησα	άρκησα	άργκησα (άρgησα)
άρχισα	άρκεψα	άρkʰισα
έρχομαι	έρκομαι έρκουμαι	έρkʰομαι
ευχαριστώ	ευκαριστώ	ευkʰαριστώ
πάσχα	πάσκαν	πάσkʰαν
έρθω	έρτω	έρtʰω
βλέπω	ημπλέπω	μπλέπω (bλέπω)
είδα	άμπλεψα/έμπλεψα	έμπλεψα (έbλεψα)
αγρίζω	αγκρίζω	αγκρίζω (αgρίζω)
ποτέ	ποtʰέ	ποτέ

αγκρίζω is often confused for an English loan word but it's actually derived from the ancient αγρίζω, from άγριος.

Some vowel comparisons
Standard	Cypriot	Classical Attic pronunciation
σκληρό	σκλερό	σκλεερό (σκλɛːρό)
μην	μεν	μεεν (μɛːν)

Extra words:
Standard	Cypriot	Classical Attic
αρέσει	αρέσκει	αρέσκει
κάνω	κάμνω	κάμνω
κάνουν	κάμνουσιν	κάμνουσιν
από που	πόθεν	πόtʰεν

Verbs
Standard	Cypriot	Classical Attic	Translation
κάνω	κάμνω	κάμνω	I'm doing
έκανες	έκαμες	έκαμε	You did
έκανες	έκαμνες	έκαμνες	You were doing
έκανε	έκαμεν	έκαμεν	He did
έκανε	έκαμνεν	έκαμνεν	He was doing
κάνουν	κάμνουσιν	κάμνουσιν	They are doing
κάνουμε	κάμνουμεν	κάμνομεν	We are doing
κάνετε	κάμνετε	κάμνετε	You are doing (plural)
κάνετε	κάμετε	κάμετε	Do it (plural)
κάνατε	εκάματε	εκάματε	You did (plrural)
κάνουμε	κάμνουμεν	κάμνομεν	We are doing
το κάνεις	κάμνειστο	κάμνεις αὐτό	You are doing it
το κάνει	κάμνειτο	κάμνει αὐτό	He is doing it

== Example texts of the dialect ==
Η 9η Ιουλίου του 1821 (Written around 1884–1895)
18 «Η Ρωμιοσύνη εν φυλή συνότζαιρη του κόσμου,

κανένας δεν εβρέθηκεν για να την ι-ξηλείψη,

κανένας, γιατί σιέπει την που τα 'ψη ο Θεός μου.

Η Ρωμιοσύνη εν να χαθή, όντες ο κόσμος λείψει!

19 Σφάξε μας ούλους τζι ας γενεί το γαίμαν μας αυλάτζιν,

κάμε τον κόσμον ματζιελλειόν τζαι τους Ρωμιούς ταούλλια,

αμμά ξέρε πως ύλαντρον όντες κοπεί καβάτζιν

τριγύρου του πετάσσουνται τρακόσια παραπούλια.

Το 'νιν αντάν να τρώ' την γην, τρώει την γην θαρκέται

μα πάντα τζιείνον τρώεται τζαι τζιείνον καταλυέται.

Είσαι πολλά πικράντερος, όμως αν θεν να σφάξης,

σφάξε τους λας που πολεμούν αλλού αρματωμένοι.

Εμάς με σιέρκα όφκαιρα γιατί να μας πειράξεις,

πού 'μαστον δίχως άρματα, τζι είμαστον νεπαμέν

8 Η νύχτα πκιον αρκίνησεν περίτου ν' αναρκώνη,

εγίνην η ανατολή κροκότσιηνη περίτου,

άρτζιεψεν πκιον το Σάββατον να πικροξημερώννη

τζι ακούστηκεν του ξύλενου σημάντρου η φωνή του.

Εξέβην ο Τζιυπριανός με τζιείνον τον καμόν του,

τζι επήεν εις την εκκλησ'ιάν τζαι βάλλει τον σταυρόν του

τζι ήτουν όσον τζι εκάμασιν αρκήν της λειτουργίας,

τζι εστάθηκεν περίλυπος τζαι σγιαν να δκιαλοίστην,

τζι επήεν τζι εγονάτισεν ομπρός της Παναίας

τζαι κάτι εψουψούρισεν τζι ευτύς εκλαμουρίστην.

27 «Εγιώ, αφέντη, μανιχά άκουσα να λαλούσιν,

πως ήρτεν ένας τοπκιανός καλόηρος που πέρα

τζι έφερεν κάμποσα χαρκιά πο τζιει που πολεμούσιν

τζι έδωκεν τα τζαι χάθηκεν, δεν έμεινεν με μέραν,

τζαι τζιείνα ούλλα τα χαρκιά πως ήταν του πολέμου.

Τα άλλα ούλλα που λαλείς εν τάκουσα ποττέ μου.»

«Είντα μας περιπαίζεις, βρε, είμαστον μισταρκοί σου;

Είπες το με το στόμαν σου μεσ' σ' τόσον παναύριν,

πε το, γιατί σκοτώννω σε, κόβκω την τζιεφαλήν σου.

Φέρτε μου τον τζιελλάττην δα, ναν δαχαμαί χαζίριν!»

30 Τότες πκιον εσυντύχασιν ούλοι κάμποσην ώραν,

για τζιείνους πων να κόψουσιν τζι αννοίξαν το δεφτέριν

τζι είδασιν πόσοι εν π' αλλού τζιαι πόσοι που την Χώραν

τζιαι πόσοι για συρτοθηλειάν τζιαι πόσοι για μασιαίριν.

τζι είσιεν πεντ' έξι πούπασιν πως εν πολλοί τζι εν κρίμαν,

τζι ο Μουσελλίμης είπεν τους: «Εν ούλλοι για το μνήμαν»!

Ο ήλιος πκιον εστύλλωσεν, εγίνην μεσομέριν

τζι ακούστην εις τον μιναρέν ο χότζ'ας να φωνάζη

τζι επάψασιν την συντυσιάν τζι αφήκαν το δεφτέριν

τζι εσηκωθήκαν ούλοι τους τζι επήαν στο ναμάζι.

English translation of "Η 9η Ιουλίου του 1821"
18 Romaness is a race as old as the world,

No one has ever been found to erase it,

No one, because my God shields it from above.

Romaness will vanish only when the world ceases to exist!

19 Slaughter us all, let our blood become a stream,

Turn the world a slaughterhouse and the Romans herds of sheep

But know that when a stump is cut at the base,

Around it, three hundred new sprouts will burst forth.

== See also ==
- Languages of Cyprus
- Arcadocypriot Greek for the ancient Greek spoken on Cyprus

== Footnotes ==
Explanatory notes

Citations

== Bibliography ==
- Ammon, Ulrich, ed. (2006). Sociolinguistics/Soziolinguistik 3: An International Handbook of the Science of Language and Society/Ein Internationales Handbuch Zur Wissenschaft Von Sprache und Gesellschaft (2 ed.). Walter de Gruyter. ISBN 9783110184181.
- Armosti, Spyros (11–14 June 2009). "The perception of plosive gemination in Cypriot Greek". On-line Proceedings of the 4th International Conference of Modern Greek Dialects and Linguistic Theory. Vol. 4. Chios, Greece (published 2010). pp. 33–53. doi:10.26220/MGDLT.V4I1.2562.
- Armosti, Spyros (2011). "Fricative and sonorant super-geminates in Cypriot Greek: a perceptual study". Studies in Modern Greek Dialects and Linguistic Theory. Nicosia: Research Centre of Kykkos Monastery. pp. 97–112.
- Arvaniti, Amalia (1999). "Cypriot Greek". Journal of the International Phonetic Association. 29 (2): 173–178. doi:10.1017/S002510030000654X. S2CID 163926812.
- Arvaniti, Amalia (2006). "Erasure as a means of maintaining diglossia in Cyprus". San Diego Linguistic Papers (2).
- Arvaniti, Amalia (2010). "A (brief) review of Cypriot Phonetics and Phonology" (PDF). The Greek Language in Cyprus from Antiquity to the Present Day. University of Athens. pp. 107–124. Archived from the original (PDF) on 2016-01-23.
- Davy, Jim; Ioannou, Yannis; Panayotou, Anna (1994). "French and English loans in Cypriot diglossia". Travaux de la Maison de l'Orient méditerranéen. Chypre hier et aujourd’hui entre Orient et Occident. Vol. 25. Nicosia, Cyprus: Université de Chypre et Université Lumière Lyon 2 (published 1996). pp. 127–136.
- Davy, Jim; Panayotou, Anna (8–21 September 2003). Phonological constraint on the phonetics of Cypriot Greek: does Cypriot Greek have geminate stops? (PDF). Proceedings of 6th International Conference of Greek Linguistics. Rethymno, Greece. Archived from the original (PDF) on 4 October 2018.
- Eftychiou, Eftychia (6–10 August 2007). "Stop-vowel coarticulation in Cypriot Greek" (PDF). Proceedings of the International Congress of Phonetic Sciences XVI. Saarbrücken, Germany. pp. 517–520.
- Georgiou, Georgios (2018). "Discrimination of L2 Greek vowel contrasts: Evidence from learners with Arabic L1 background". Speech Communication. 102: 68–77. doi:10.1016/j.specom.2018.07.003. S2CID 52297330.
- Georgiou, Georgios (2019). "Bit and beat are heard as the same: Mapping the vowel perceptual patterns of Greek-English bilingual children". Language Sciences. 72: 1–12. doi:10.1016/j.langsci.2018.12.001. S2CID 150229377.
- Grohmann, Kleanthes K.; Papadopoulou, Elena; Themistocleous, Charalambos (2017). "Acquiring Clitic Placement in Bilectal Settings: Interactions between Social Factors". Frontiers in Communication. 2 (5). doi:10.3389/fcomm.2017.00005.
- Hadjioannou, Xenia; Tsiplakou, Stavroula; Kappler, Matthias (2011). "Language policy and language planning in Cyprus". Current Issues in Language Planning. 12 (4): 503–569. doi:10.1080/14664208.2011.629113. hdl:10278/29371. S2CID 143966308.
- Joseph, Brian D. (2010). "Greek, Modern". In Brown, Keith; Ogilvie, Sarah (eds.). Concise Encyclopedia of Languages of the World. Elsevier. pp. 464–467. ISBN 9780080877754.
- Joseph, Brian D.; Tserdanelis, Georgios (2003). "Modern Greek". In Roelcke, Thorsten (ed.). Variationstypologie. Ein sprachtypologisches Handbuch zu den europäischen Sprachen in Geschichte und Gegenwart / Variation Typology. A Typological Handbook of European Languages. Walter de Gruyter. pp. 823–836.
- Nevins, Andrew Ira; Chirotan, Ioana (2008). "Phonological Representations and the Variable Patterning of Glides" (PDF). Lingua. 118 (12): 1979–1997. doi:10.1016/j.lingua.2007.10.006. S2CID 59373528.
- Newton, Brian (1972). Cypriot Greek: Its phonology and inflections. The Hague: Mouton.
- Pappas, Panayiotis (11–14 June 2009). "A new sociolinguistic variable in Cypriot Greek" (PDF). On-line Proceedings of the 4th International Conference of Modern Greek Dialects and Linguistic Theory. Chios, Greece. pp. 305–314. Archived from the original (PDF) on 24 May 2013.
- Themistocleous, Charalambos; Tsiplakou, Stavroula (2013). "High Rising Terminals in Cypriot Greek: Charting 'Urban' Intonation". In Auer, Peter; Reina, Javier Caro; Kaufmann, Göz (eds.). Language Variation - European Perspectives IV: Selected papers from the Sixth International Conference on Language Variation in Europe (ICLaVE 6), Freiburg, June 2011. Amsterdam: John Benjamin's. pp. 159–172.
- Themistocleous, Charalambos; Logotheti, Angeliki (2016). "Standard Modern Greek and Cypriot Greek vowels: a sociophonetic study". In Ralli, Angela; Koutsoukos, Nikos; Bompolas, Stavros (eds.). 6th International Conference on Modern Greek Dialects and Linguistic Theory (MGDLT6), September 25-28, 2014. University of Patras. pp. 177–183.
- Themistocleous, Charalambos (2014). "Edge-Tone Effects and Prosodic Domain Effects on Final Lengthening". Linguistic Variation. 14 (1): 129–160. doi:10.1075/lv.14.1.06the.
- Themistocleous, Charalambos (2016). "Seeking an Anchorage. Stability and Variability in Tonal Alignment of Rising Prenuclear Pitch Accents in Cypriot Greek". Language and Speech. 59 (4): 433–461. doi:10.1177/0023830915614602. PMID 28008803. S2CID 24397973.
- Themistocleous, Charalambos (2016). "The bursts of stops can convey dialectal information". The Journal of the Acoustical Society of America. 140 (4): EL334–EL339. Bibcode:2016ASAJ..140L.334T. doi:10.1121/1.4964818. PMID 27794314.
- Themistocleous, Charalambos; Savva, Angelandria; Aristodemou, Andrie (2016). "Effects of stress on fricatives: Evidence from Standard Modern Greek". Interspeech 2016. pp. 1–4.
- Themistocleous, Charalambos (2017a). "Dialect classification using vowel acoustic parameters". Speech Communication. 92: 13–22. doi:10.1016/j.specom.2017.05.003.
- Themistocleous, Charalambos (2017b). "The Nature of Phonetic Gradience across a Dialect Continuum: Evidence from Modern Greek Vowels". Phonetica. 74 (3): 157–172. doi:10.1159/000450554. PMID 28268213. S2CID 7596117.
- Themistocleous, Charalambos; Katsoyannou, Marianna; Armosti, Spyros; Christodoulou, Kyriaci (7–11 August 2012). Cypriot Greek Lexicography: A Reverse Dictionary of Cypriot Greek (PDF). 15th European Association for Lexicography (EURALEX) Conference. Oslo, Norway. Archived from the original (PDF) on 6 August 2016.
- Themistocleous, Christiana (2010). "Writing in a non-standard Greek variety: Romanized Cypriot Greek in online chat". Writing Systems Research. 2. 2 (2): 155–168. doi:10.1093/wsr/wsq008.
- Tserdanelis, Giorgos; Arvaniti, Amalia (2001). "The acoustic characteristics of geminate consonants in Cypriot Greek" (PDF). Proceedings of the 4th International Conference on Greek Linguistics. Thessaloniki, Greece: University Studio Press. pp. 29–36. Archived from the original (PDF) on 2010-06-16.
- Tsiplakou, Stravoula (21–24 August 2012). Charting Nicosian: properties and perceptions of an emergent urban dialect variety. Sociolinguistics Symposium 19. Berlin, Germany.
