= Languages of Cyprus =

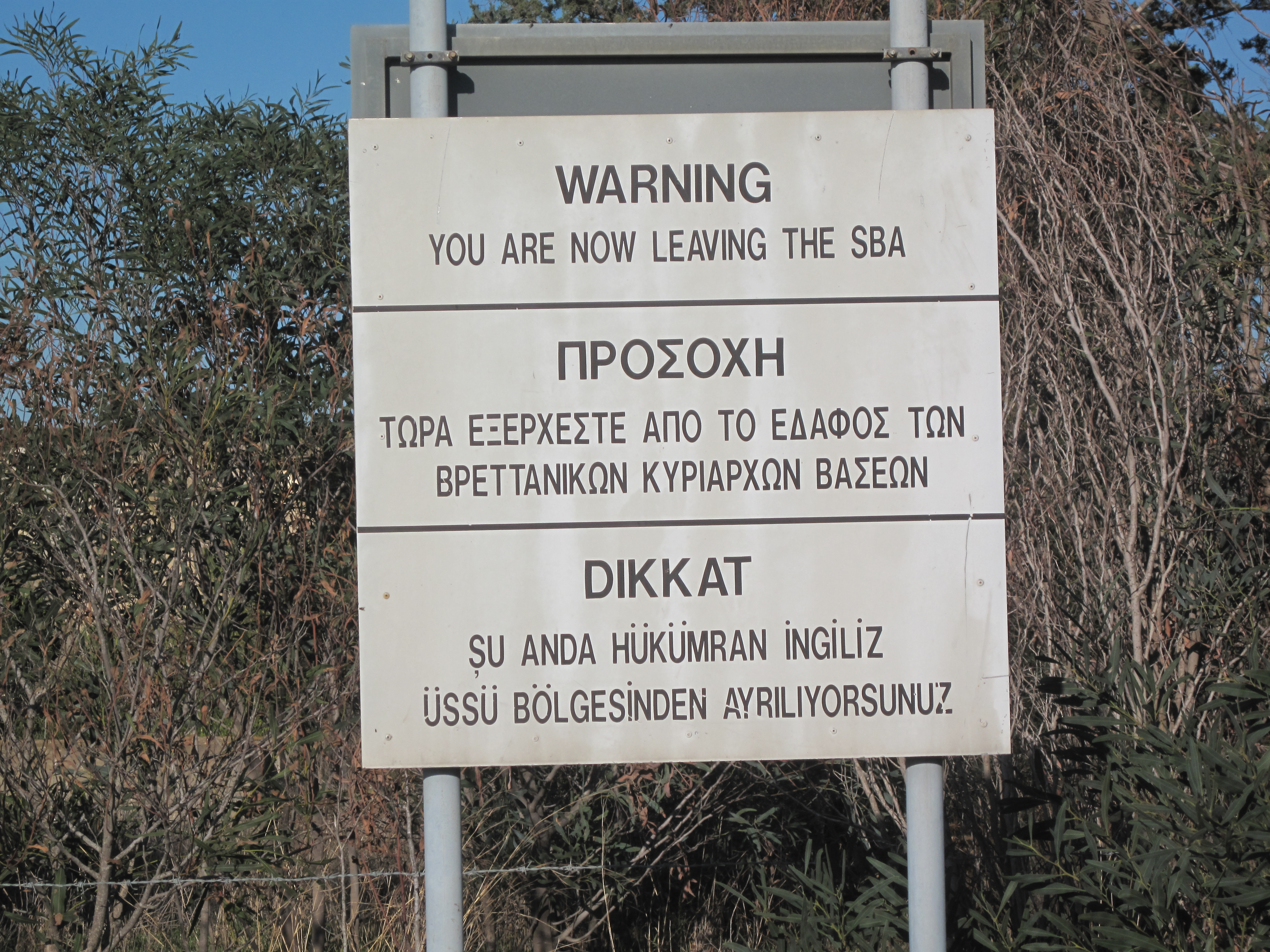
- Sign in the Sovereign Base Areas of Akrotiri and Dhekelia in English, Greek, and Turkish.
- Official: Greek; Turkish
- Vernacular: Cypriot Greek; Cypriot Turkish
- Minority: Armenian (recognised); Cypriot Arabic (recognised); Kurbetcha (unrecognised)
- Foreign: English (73%); French (7%); German (5%)
- Signed: Greek Sign Language (south); Turkish Sign Language (north); Cypriot Sign Language
- Keyboard layout: Greek keyboard

The official languages of the Republic of Cyprus are Greek and Turkish. The everyday spoken language (vernacular) of Greek Cypriots is Cypriot Greek, and that of Turkish Cypriots is Cypriot Turkish. For official purposes, the standard languages (Standard Modern Greek and Standard Turkish) are used.

According to the European Charter for Regional or Minority Languages of the Council of Europe, Armenian was recognised as a minority language of Cyprus as of 1 December 2002.

Three "religious groups" are recognised by the constitution; two have their own language: Armenian (the language of Armenian Cypriots) and Cypriot Arabic (the language of Maronite Cypriots). Sometimes Kurbetcha, the language of the Kurbet, the Cypriot Roma, is included alongside the other two in literature, but it is not officially recognised in any capacity.

The 2011 census of the Republic recorded 679,883 native speakers of Greek, 34,814 of English, 24,270 of Romanian, 20,984 of Russian and 18,388 of Bulgarian of a total of 840,407. Following the 1974 Turkish invasion, Cyprus was effectively divided into two linguistically near-homogeneous areas: the Turkish-speaking north and the Greek-speaking south; only 1,405 speakers of Turkish reside in territory controlled by the Republic.

The languages of Cyprus have historically exerted influence on one another; Cypriot Greek and Cypriot Turkish borrowed heavily from each other, and Cypriot Greek has helped shape Cypriot Arabic's phonology.

== Cypriot Greek ==
Languages spoken in territory under control of the Republic of Cyprus (2011)
| Language |
| Greek (official) | 80.9% |
| English | 4.1% |
| Romanian | 2.9% |
| Russian | 2.5% |
| Bulgarian | 2.2% |
| Arabic | 1.2% |
| Filipino | 1.1% |
| Turkish (official) | 0.2% |
| Other | 4.3% |
| Unspecified | 0.6% |

Greek was originally brought to Cyprus by Greek settlers in the 12th–11th century BCE. The earliest known Cypriot Greek inscription dates to c. 1000 BC. The contemporary Cypriot Greek (CG)—the mother tongue of Greek Cypriots—evolved from later Byzantine Koine, under the influence of the languages of the many colonisers of the island. CG differs markedly from Standard Modern Greek (SMG), particularly in its phonology, morphology and vocabulary, and CG may be difficult for speakers of other varieties of Greek to understand or may even be unintelligible to some. CG has a literary tradition that flourished before the Ottoman conquest of 1571.

SMG has been the language of instruction in Greek Cypriot education since the late 19th century (then Katharevousa) and is the language used in Greek-language media in the country (though in a recognisably Cypriot form). Indeed, Greek Cypriot society is diglossic, with SMG the high (taught) and CG the low variety (naturally acquired), itself a dialect continuum that has been long undergoing levelling and koinénisation. SMG exerts a continuing influence on CG, and CG speakers code-mix and code-switch between the two varieties in formal settings. Greek Cypriots' tendency to "downplay the differences between the two varieties" has been thought to help preserve diglossia in circumstances that would have otherwise led to the demise of the low variety (CG).

Many Turkish Cypriots have traditionally (prior to 1974) been fluent in CG, meaning CG served as the "vernacular lingua franca" of the island. Some Turkish Cypriots were uni-lingual in Greek.

== Cypriot Turkish ==
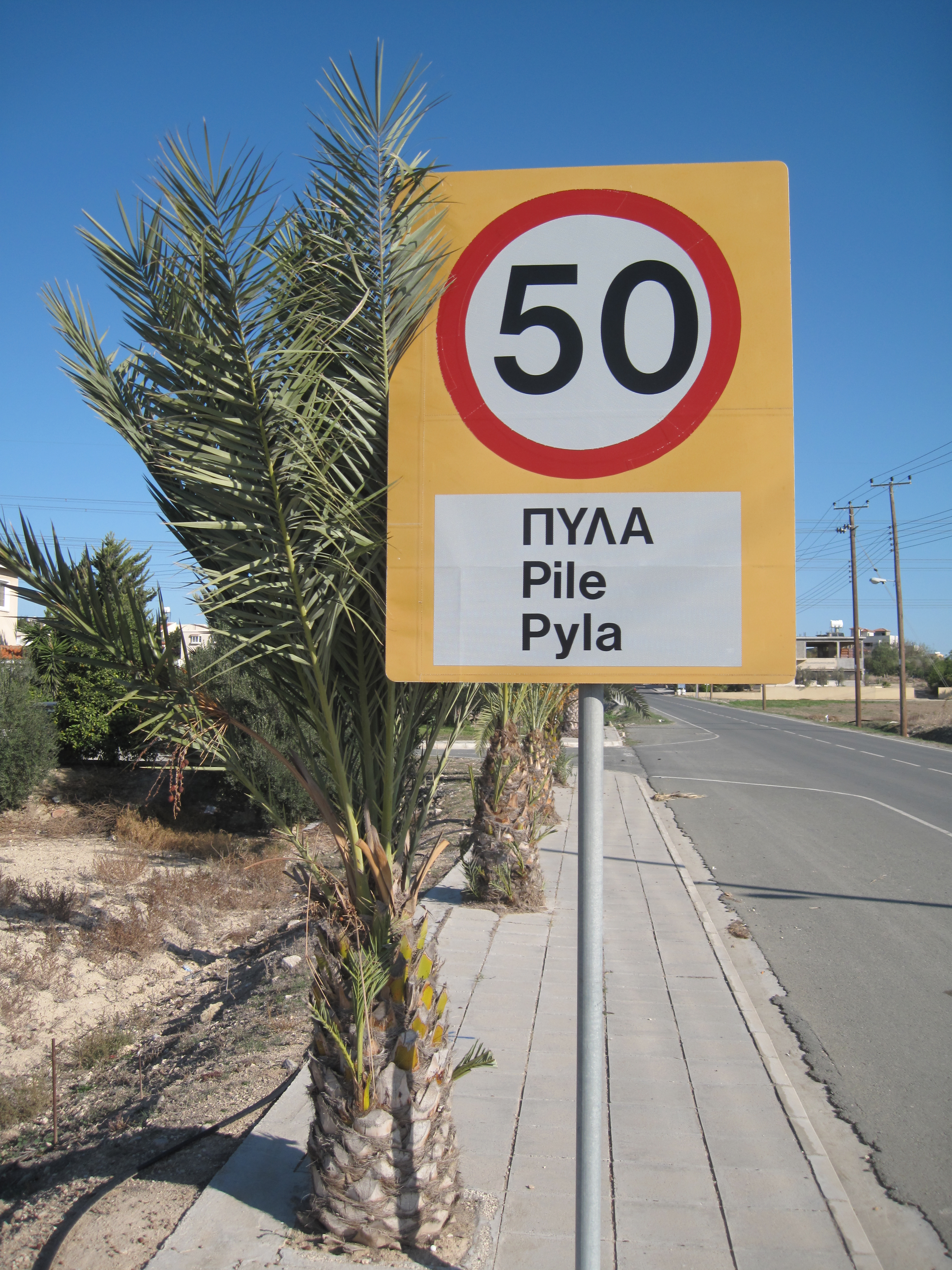
Road sign outside Pyla, Cyprus, in Greek (in capital letters, top), Turkish (middle) and English (bottom)

Emanating from Anatolia and evolved for four centuries, Cypriot Turkish is the vernacular spoken by Cypriots with Ottoman ancestry, as well as by Cypriots who converted to Islam during Ottoman rule.

Cypriot Turkish consists of a blend of Ottoman Turkish and the Yörük dialect that is spoken in the Taurus Mountains of southern Turkey. In addition it has absorbed influences from Greek, Italian and English. Cypriot Turkish is mutually intelligible with Standard Turkish.

== Minority languages ==
Two minority languages are covered by the European Charter for Regional or Minority Languages in Cyprus, Armenian and Cypriot Arabic.

=== Armenian ===
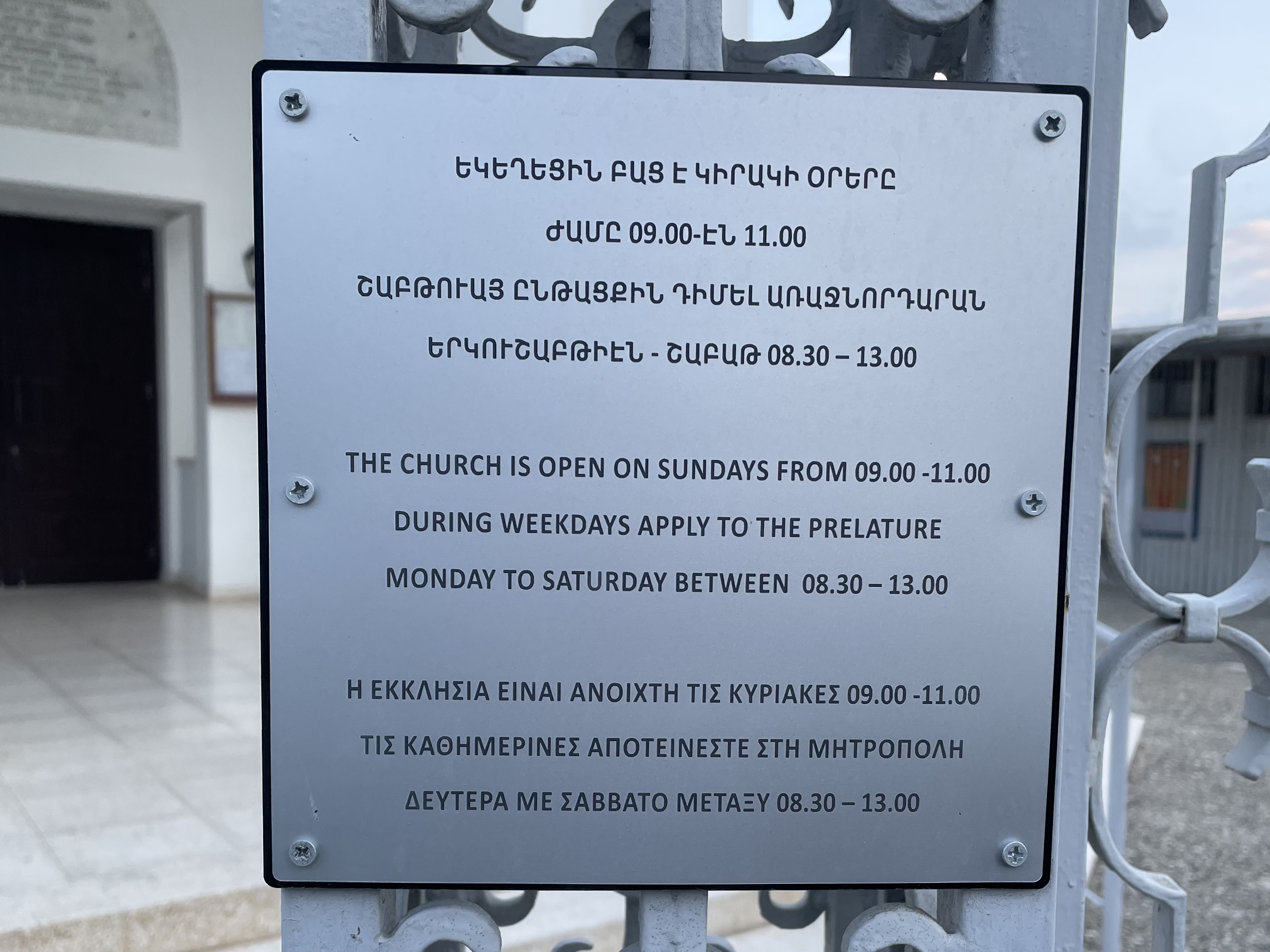
Sign in Armenian, English and Greek at the Holy Mother of God Cathedral, Nicosia

Armenians have inhabited Cyprus since the sixth century AD, but about 9,000 more arrived from Turkey in the early 20th century to escape the Armenian genocide. Of those, most moved on to other countries. Today, Western Armenian is taught in Armenian schools (Nareg) and is the first language of about 3,000 people of Armenian descent in the Republic. Armenian Cypriots are often bilingual in Greek and Armenian. In 2014, it was reported that there are 668 Armenian first-language speakers in Republic of Cyprus-controlled areas (of a total 1,831 Armenian Cypriots).

=== Cypriot Arabic ===
It is not entirely clear when Arabic first made its way to Cyprus, but Arabic speakers are known to have emigrated from the Levant in the late 12th century AD. Today, Cypriot Arabic (CA) is moribund with efforts being made to revitalise it. It is spoken by an estimated 900 Cypriot Maronites, all over the age of 30. Kormakitis was a long-time stronghold of the language, but most Maronites relocated to the south and spread after 1974, fuelling its—now very likely—death. CA speakers are bilingual in Greek and CA, and CA, having long existed cut off from other varieties of Arabic, has been heavily influenced by Cypriot Greek, with respect to its syntax, vocabulary and, particularly, phonology: it has lost all emphatic consonants and stop voicing opposition. CA has traits in common with some north Syrian and Mesopotamian dialects and sedentary vernaculars spoken on the Levantine coast. Cypriot Arabic has not so far been codified, though there are plans to do so. In 2014, it was reported that, in the 2011 census, of all 3,656 Maronite Cypriots in Republic of Cyprus-controlled areas "none declared [Cypriot Arabic] to be their first language".

=== Kurbetcha ===
There is an unknown number of Roma, speakers of Kurbetcha (or Gurbetcha), a creole with vocabulary that is predominantly Romani and Cypriot Turkish grammar, residing in Northern Cyprus. Kurbetcha is not protected by the Charter and has been little studied.

= Foreign languages =
Proficiency in English is high (higher than in many other European countries), and Cypriots that receive education in English might code-switch between their native language and English. English features on road signs, public notices, and in advertisements, etc. English was the sole official language during British colonial rule and lingua franca (until 1960) and continued to be used (de facto) in courts of law until 1989 and in legislature until 1963. A reported 80.4% of residents of Cyprus perceive to have command of the English language as L2, 10.8% of French, 4.6% of German, 2.8% of Russian, and 2.0% of Spanish. On average, Cypriots speak 1.2 foreign languages. According to the Eurobarometer, 73% of people of Cyprus can speak English, 12% can speak French and 5% can speak German.

Foreign language lessons become compulsory at the age of 9 (2008).

== Extinct languages ==
=== The Cypro-Minoan syllabary and earlier languages ===
It is reckoned written language first made its appearance in Cyprus in the 16th century BCE with the yet-to-be-deciphered Cypro-Minoan syllabary, an offshoot of Linear A "with some additional elements of hieroglyphic affiliation" that was the basis for the later Cypriot syllabary. The Cypro-Minoan syllabary may have been used to write more than one language.

=== Arcadocypriot and transitional Greek ===
The ancient Arcadocypriot dialect of Greek was spoken by the Mycenaean Greeks to first settle in Cyprus in the 12th or 11th century BCE. It was eventually succeeded by Koine Greek in the fourth century BCE and later Byzantine Koine evolved into Cypriot Greek.

=== Eteocypriot ===
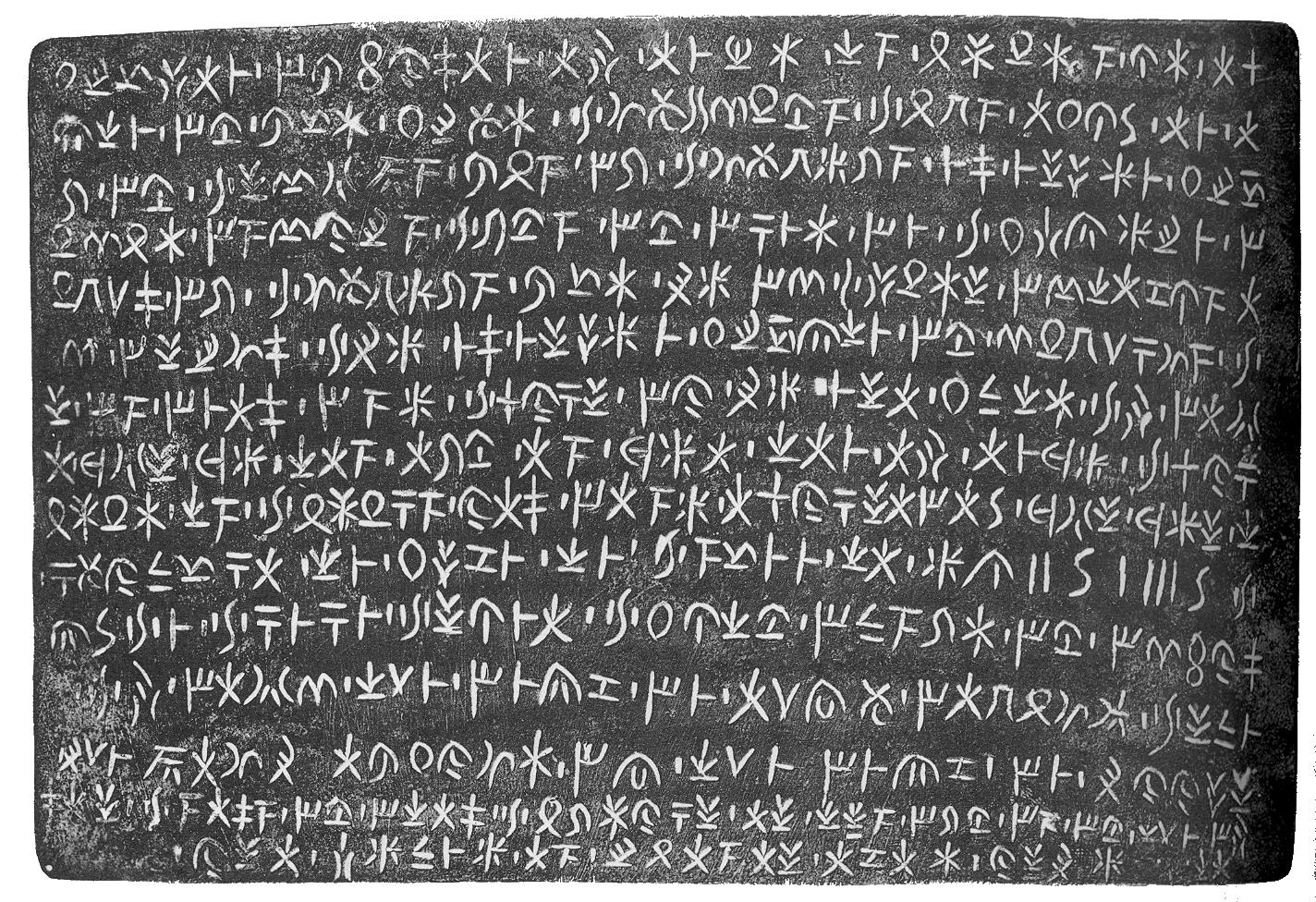
The Idalion tablet, inscribed in the Cypriot syllabary, from the fifth century BCE. The tablet is named after Idalion or Idalium, one of ten ancient Cypriot city-kingdoms

Eteocypriot was a pre-Indo-European language, indigenous to the island, that competed with Greek following the latter's arrival and was ultimately supplanted by it by the third century BCE. It was written in the Cypriot syllabary that was adopted for Arcadocypriot; the same writing system was used to write both (unrelated) languages. For the time that the two languages co-existed, the peoples of Cyprus were bilingual (and bicultural).
