= Hedina Tahirović-Sijerčić =

Bosnian journalist, teacher, writer

Hedina Tahirović-Sijerčić (born 11 November 1960) is a Bosnian Gurbeti Romani journalist, broadcaster, writer, translator, linguistic researcher and teacher, currently residing in Canada. She was a popular television and radio broadcaster in Bosnia and Herzegovina, and later went on to become a writer, publishing children's books, poetry, and memoirs. She is a scholar of the Gurbeti dialect of the Romani language and has published several dictionaries and archives of folk tales, and is active in efforts to preserve Romani culture. Her writing has won several awards in Poland, Croatia, and Sarajevo.

== Early life and education ==
Tahirović-Sijerčić was born in Sarajevo on 11 November 1960 and belongs to the Gurbeti Romani people. She studied journalism at the University of Sarajevo, graduating in 1985, and earned a further degree in teaching from the University of Tuzla. She also earned a Magister Diploma from Center for Interdisciplinary Postdiploma Studies and Gender Studies at the University of Sarajevo. Following her emigration to Canada, she obtained an additional teaching qualification from the Ontario College of Teachers. Her Doctoral diploma she earned from University of Belgrade.

== Career ==
In the 1980s, Tahirović-Sijerčić became a notable radio and television in the Bosnia-Herzegovina. From 1986 to 1992, she was the chief editor of a popular radio program, Lačho džive, Romaleni, (tr: Have a good day, Roma people) and between 1991 and 1992, she hosted Malavipe (tr: Meetings), a TV Sarajevo program. She was the first film and television producer of Romani origin in Bosnia-Herzegovina. She worked towards establishing the rights of the Romani people, with the International Romani Union.

In the 1990s, following her emigration to Canada, she began teaching for the Toronto District School Board, while writing fiction and poetry. Her published books include works written in Gurbeti, Bosnian, and English. She has written five children's books and two volumes of poetry. Her work has won several awards and prizes, including the Ferenc Sztojka Prize, the Golden Pen of Papusza and the Freedom Award from the International Peace Center in Sarajevo. She has translated her own writing to English and German, as well as editing anthologies of translated works by Romani writers. She was the chief editor of Romano Lil, a magazine for Canadian-Romani people, from 1998 to 2001.

Tahirović-Sijerčić also writes non-fiction, and has focused particularly on documenting Romani culture and researching the Gurbeti dialect. She has published three collections of Romani folktales and folklore, several dictionaries of the Gurbeti dialect, a biography of her father, and an autobiography. She has taught Romani language, culture and literature at the University of Zagreb. In 2014 to 2020, she was appointed to a committee of experts to advise the Council of Europe on the European Charter for Regional and Minority Languages in Bosnia and Herzegovina.

== Awards and honors ==
- 2009: Book Prize, "The best promoted work" for the book "How God made the Roma / Sar o Devel cherda e Rromen" at the XXI Book Fair in Sarajevo
- 2010: The Golden Pen of Papusza’ in Tarnow, Poland
- 2011: Award "Freedom" for the promotion and affirmation of Human rights in BiH and the world (Nagrada Sloboda) from the International Centre for Peace in Sarajevo
- 2011: Prize for lifelong work in poetry and Romani language creativity "Ferenc Sztojka", in Zagreb, Croatia
- 2022: Book Prize for publishers and editor, "Preservation and valorization of literary heritage" for the books "Rade Uhlik - Rromane paramiča / Romske priče /" Zbirka I i Zbirka II (2020, 2021) at the XXXIII Book Fair in Sarajevo

== Personal life and activism ==
In the 1990s, she emigrated to Germany and later to Canada, and has since been active in supporting the rights of the Romani people and in preserving and archiving Romani culture. She speaks several languages, including Bosnian, Romani (Gurbeti), English and German. In 2017, she signed the Declaration on the Common Language of the Croats, Serbs, Bosniaks and Montenegrins. In 2009, she was the subject of a documentary film, Hedina, about her life, which was directed by Zoran Kubura.

== Bibliography ==
- 1999. Editor, Canadian Romani Pearls (Kanadake Romane Mirikle) (Roma Community and Advocacy Centre, Canada)
- 2001. Translator, Na dzanen aver, gova si amaro dzuvdipe (How We Live) (Medica Zenica-Infoteka, Bosnia - Herzegovina)
- 2004. Translator, Romany Legends. (London: Turnshare) [In English and German]
- 2007. Dukh / Pain (Toronto: Magoria Books)
- 2008. Translator, The Little Prince by Antoine de St. Exupery (into Romani) (The Bosnian Word, Bosnia - Herzegovina)
- 2008. Stare romske bajke i price (Old Romani legends and folktales) in Bosnian & Romani (The Bosnian Word, Bosnia - Herzegovina)
- 2009. Romane Paramicha. Stories and Legends of the Gurbeti Roma (Toronto: Magoria Books)
- 2009. Editor, Like water/ Sar o Paj (ed.). (Chandigarh, India: International Writers Association)
- 2009. Romani prince Penga. (Toronto: Magoria Books)
- 2009. An unusual family. (Toronto: Magoria Books)
- 2010. Karankochi-Kochi. (Toronto: Magoria Books)
- 2010. Čuj, osjeti bol /Ashun, hachar Dukh! (Sarajevo: KNS)
- 2010. Shtar Phrala / Four Brothers. (Toronto: Magoria Books). [Illustrated children's stories in English and Romani].
- 2010. Bosansko-romski i romsko-bosanski rječnik. (Mostar: Federalno ministarstvo obrazovanja i nauke)
- 2011. Fish / Macho. (Toronto: Magoria Books)
- 2011. Rom like Thunder. (Toronto: Magoria Books)
- 2011. Romani Dictionary: Gurbeti-English/English-Gurbeti. (Toronto: Magoria Books)
- 2012. Rom k’o Grom. (Sarajevo: KNS)
- 2016. Rodni identiteti u književnosti romskih autorica na prostorima bivše Jugoslavije. (Mostar: Federalno ministarstvo obrazovanja i nauke)
- 2017. A Romani Women’s Anthology: Spectrum of the Blue Water.Tahirović-Sijerčić, Hedina; Levine-Rasky, Cynthia (eds). (Toronto: Inanna Publications)
- 2019. Language and literature of Roma within translation in the Western Balkans: Poetry in self-translation. (Sarajevo: Dobra knjiga)
- 2019. Romani čhib: Posebni osvrti na jezik i kulturu Roma. (Sarajevo: Dobra knjiga)
- 2020. Editor, Rade Uhlik – Rromane paramiča/ Romske priče. Zbirka I. (Sarajevo: Fond otvoreno društvo BiH i Zemaljski muzej BiH)
- 2021. Editor, Rade Uhlik – Rromane paramiča/ Romske priče. Zbirka II. (Sarajevo: Fond otvoreno društvo BiH i Zemaljski muzej BiH)
