= Anaphoric clitic =

Clitic that refers to a previously mentioned constituent

In linguistics, anaphoric clitics is a specific subset of clitics: morphologically-bound morphemes that syntactically resemble one word unit, but are bound phonologically to another word unit. Anaphoric clitics are a type of anaphor, meaning that they refer to previously mentioned constituents. Anaphoric clitics thus fill a position in a clause that would otherwise be occupied by a noun phrase, meaning that they are in complementary distribution with full noun phrases. A sentence can thus either contain an anaphoric clitic or a full noun phrase carrying out a particular grammatical function, but not both.

For example, in the Yagua language, spoken in Peru, there is an anaphoric clitic sa which appears before the verb, in subject function: the verb can either have a full noun phrase subject, or the clitic sa.
