= Cypriot Turkish =

Turkish dialect spoken in Cyprus

- Kıbrıs Türkçesi
- Native to: Cyprus (island)
- Region: Cyprus and Turkish Cypriot diaspora
- Ethnicity: Turkish Cypriots
- Language family: Turkic: Common Turkic; Oghuz; Western Oghuz; Turkish; Anatolian; Western Anatolian; Cypriot Turkish
- Writing system: Latin (Turkish alphabet)

Official status
- Regulated by: Unregulated (Istanbul Turkish used as written language)

Language codes
- ISO 639-3: –
- Glottolog: cypr1251
- IETF: tr-CY

Cypriot Turkish (Kıbrıs Türkçesi) is a dialect of the Turkish language spoken by Turkish Cypriots both in Cyprus and in the diaspora.

== History ==
Emanating from Anatolia and evolved for four centuries, Cypriot Turkish is the vernacular spoken by Cypriots with Ottoman ancestry, as well as by Cypriots who converted to Islam during Ottoman rule. It is understood by expatriate Cypriots living in the UK, United States, Australia and other parts of the world.

Cypriot Turkish consists of a blend of Ottoman Turkish and the Yörük dialect that is spoken in the Taurus Mountains of southern Turkey. In addition, it has absorbed influences from Greek, Italian and English. Cypriot Turkish is mutually intelligible with Standard Turkish.

Since the 1974 Turkish invasion of Cyprus, Turkish is found almost exclusively in Northern Cyprus, which is home to approximately 300,000 native Turkish speakers (including varieties of Turkish other than Cypriot) as of 2016 and 1,400 speakers in the south as of 2013. Of these, a significant number are immigrants from Turkey who do not speak the Cypriot variety of Turkish. Cypriot Turkish is not used officially in the north, where modern standard Turkish became the de facto official language of schools, government, and the media.

== Phonology ==
=== Differences between standard Turkish and Cypriot Turkish ===
Cypriot Turkish is distinguished by a number of sound alternations not found in standard Turkish, but some of which are also quite common in other Turkish vernaculars:

- Voicing of some unvoiced stops
  - t↔d, k↔g

Standard Turkish taş ↔ Cypriot Turkish daş "stone"
Standard Turkish kurt ↔ Cypriot Turkish gurt "wolf"
Standard Turkish patates ↔ Cypriot Turkish badadez "potato"

- Preservation of earlier Turkic *ñ

Standard Turkish nasılsın? ↔ Cypriot Turkish nasılsıñ? "how are you?"
Standard Turkish bin ↔ Cypriot Turkish biñ "thousand"
Standard Turkish: Arabaya binmek ↔ Cypriot Turkish: Arabaya biñmek "getting in the car"

- Changing 1st person plural suffix
  - z↔k

Standard Turkish isteriz ↔ Cypriot Turkish isderik "we want"

- Unvoicing of some voiced stops
  - b↔p

Standard Turkish: bakla ↔ Cypriot Turkish: pakla "broad beans"

- Lenition of final affricates
  - ç ([tʃ]) ↔ ş ([ʃ])

Standard Turkish hiç ↔ Cypriot Turkish hiş "no, none"

The last two alternations are more specific to Cypriot Turkish and are seen less often in other Turkish vernaculars.

=== Consonants ===
Cypriot Turkish consonants are mostly the same as standard Turkish consonants. However, Cypriot Turkish has retained the phonemes /ŋ/ and /ɣ/, whereas standard Turkish lost them.

Consonant phonemes
	Labial		Alveolar		Palatal		Velar		Glottal
Plosive	p	b	t̪	d̪	c	ɟ	k	ɡ	
Affricate					tʃ	dʒ			
Fricative	f	v	s̟	z̟	ʃ	ʒ		ɣ	h
Nasal	m		n				ŋ		
Flap/Tap			ɾ						
Lateral			l	ɫ					
Semivowel					j				

=== Vowels ===
	front		back	
	unrounded	rounded	unrounded	rounded
high	i (i)	y (ü)	ɯ (ı)	u (u)
mid/low	ɛ (e)	ø (ö)	ɑ (a)	o (o)

== Grammar ==
Cypriot Turkish is structured as a VO language as opposed to standard Turkish which is an OV language. It is very typical in forming a question.

- Standard Turkish Okula gidecek misin? is, in Cypriot Turkish, Gideceñ okula? ("Will you go to school?")

Cypriot Turkish uses the aorist tense instead of the present simple tense, and very often in place of the future tense as well.

- Standard Turkish Okula gidiyorum or Okula gideceğim ("I am going to school") are, in Cypriot Turkish, Giderim okula ("I go to school" / "I am going to school" / "I will go to school")

Cypriot Turkish does not use the narrative/indefinite past, and only uses the simple past instead.

- Standard Turkish Eve gitmiş ("He is reported to have gone home") is, in Cypriot Turkish, not used. Instead Eve gitti or Gitti eve ("He went home") suffices.

Cypriot Turkish also lacks the question suffix of mi. This is similar to colloquial Azerbaijani.

- Standard Turkish Annen evde midir? ("Is your mother at home?") is, in Cypriot Turkish, Anneñ evdedir?

In Cypriot Turkish, the reflexive pronoun in third person is different, namely geñni ("him, himself, them, themself"). In Standard Turkish, this would be kendisi.

== Semantics ==
Typical questions usually do not qualify as standard Turkish questions (see the example above) because question suffixes are usually dropped by native Turkish Cypriots. Another subtle difference is the emphasis on verbs.

== See also ==
- Languages of Cyprus

== Bibliography ==
- Erdoğan Saracoğlu (1992). Kıbrıs Ağzı: Sesbilgisi Özellikleri, Metin Derlemeleri, Sözlük. K.K.T.C. Millî Eğitim ve Kültür Bakanlığı. ISBN 975-17-1015-4.
- Yıltan Taşçı (1986). Kıbrıs Ağzı Dil Özellikleri. Lefkoşa: Akar Yayıncılık.
