= Tsiflikoudia =

Quarter of Limassol Municipality

Tsiflikoudia (Greek: Τσιφλικούδια, Turkish: Chiftlikler) is a municipality in the province of Limassol in Cyprus.

== Location ==
Tsiflikoudia is part of the Limassol district. It is situated south of Limassol (and the settlement of Zakaki), close to Kato Polemidia and Ypsonas (northwest), Trachoni (west) and Asomatos (southwest). It includes Aplostra beach, ("stretcher") named because of the way the shore stretches along the sea coast. (Exonym: Lady's Mile beach, coming from a British officer who was using the beach for his daily rides on his horse named Lady). Akrotiri British Forces Military Base is also in the area.

== History ==
According to a 1935 article in a Cypriot newspaper, the Tserkezoi inhabitants settled in Fasouri (an area adjacent to Tsiflikoudia) in 1864. These people came from modern day Georgia and Russia. After the imposition of Russian rule in their region and the prolonged conflict that followed, they migrated to various territories of the Ottoman Empire, including Cyprus. Despite the adverse reaction of the Greek Cypriots and the French and American consuls in Cyprus, the Circassians remained, buying a tsifliki in the area of Fasouri and settling there. The 500 settlers engaged in agriculture, but nearby swamps led to outbreaks of malaria which destroyed the community.

The area fell into the hands of a Turkish landowner, who used it to cultivate tobacco. Another small settlement was established, inhabited by Turkish Cypriots and a few Greek Cypriots. Over time the Greek Cypriots became the majority, but the population as a whole remained small. Tsifliki of the Circassians (as it was called) came under the dominion of the People's Bank of Cyprus. The CPPC (Cyprus Palestine Plantation Ltd, now known as the Cyprus Phassouri Plantations Co. Ltd) was actively involved in the agricultural development of the area.

David Slonin arrived in Cyprus in 1933 to take a position as director of Fasouri Farm. He stated in a Cypriot newspaper article of 1934 that he wanted to change the area from swamps into a paradise. 30,000 cypress and 25,000 eucalyptus trees were planted, which, being hydrophilic, helped drain the swamps. At the same time, relief works were started, concentrating on the fight against malaria through further drainage of the swamps. Big farms were then created. The company's main focus was originally on the production, packaging, and marketing of citrus fruits, but in 1940 the company distributors started experimental tobacco cultivation. Later in the 1940s, Nikolas Panagi Lanitis bought the Tsifliki of the Circassians and it was renamed Laniti Farm, a name that is still in use today. Tsiflikoudia is also associated with the local traditional boatbuilding community since the 1970s, particularly after shipwrights had to resettle as a result of the 1974-war events. The number of traditional shipwrights specialising in wooden boat construction dwindled over the years, and by 2020 local authorities decided to relocate the shipyards to Moni area.

Further additions included the Fasouri Watermania water park and the nearby My Mall Limassol, the only shopping center in Limassol. City of Dreams Mediterranean, the EU’s largest casino hotel was opened in the area in 2023. The area's government is considered an example of how Greek-Cypriots and Turkish-Cypriots can work together to manage common cultural inheritances.

== Historic site ==
There is a Circassian mosque in the village which was built during the Ottoman Empire’s occupation of Cyprus. It has been restored with European Union funding as it is considered a cultural monument of great importance to Cyprus.
