= Doma (castes) =

Ethnic group of India

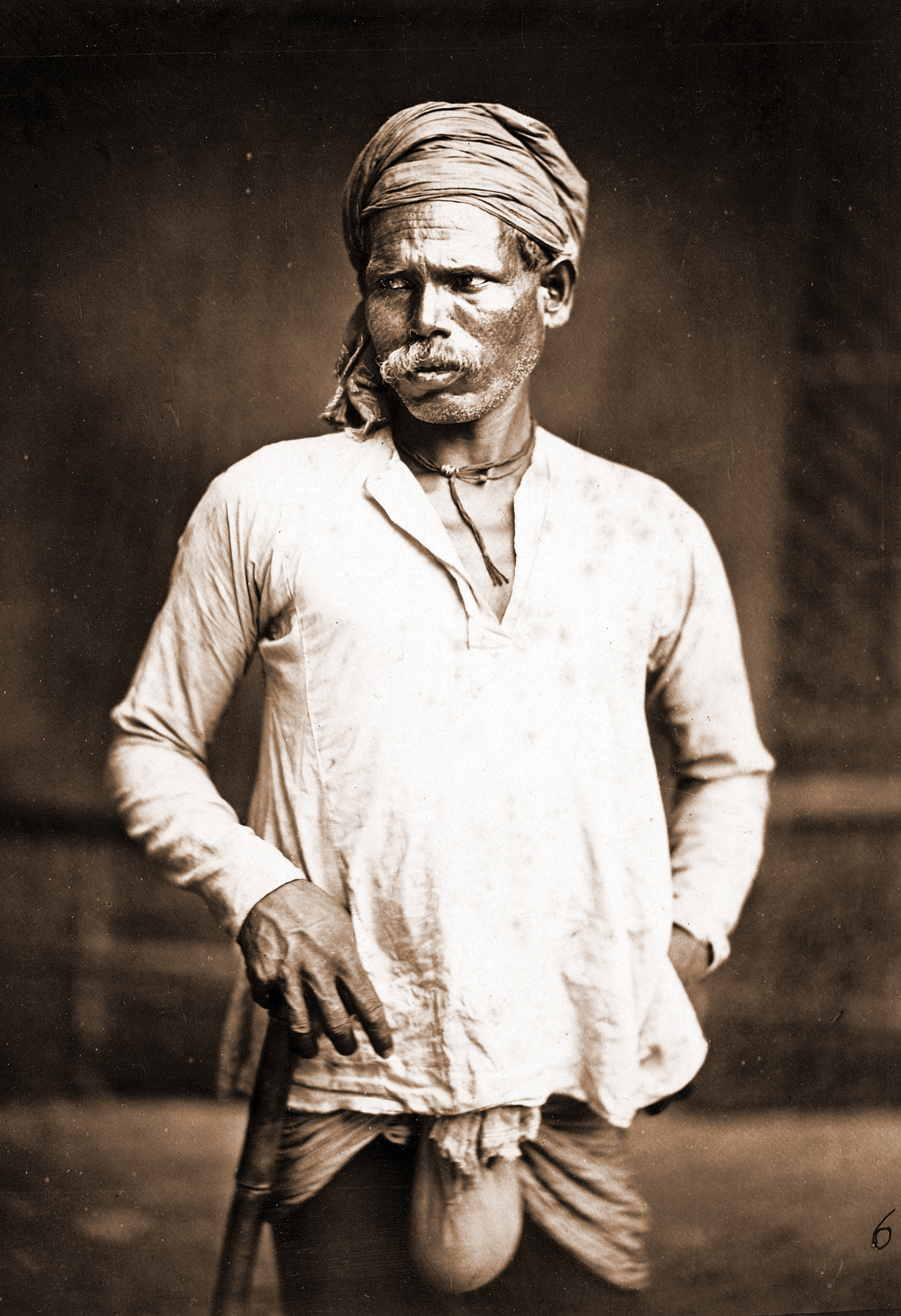
A Dom man in Eastern Bengal, c. 1860.

The Doma (Sanskrit: डोम, romanized: ḍoma, IPA: [ɖoːmɐ]), also known as Dom, Domra, Domba, Domaka, Dombara and Dombari, are castes, or groups, scattered across India. The Doma/Dom were a caste of drummers. According to Tantra scriptures, the Dom were engaged in the occupations of singing and playing music. Historically, they were considered one of the untouchable castes, known as Dalits, and their traditional occupation was the disposal and cremation of dead bodies. The Doma were formerly classified as a criminal tribe under the 1870s Criminal Tribes Acts of the British Raj. They are in the list of Scheduled Castes for Reservation in India in the Indian states of Uttar Pradesh, Bihar, Odisha, Andhra Pradesh, Jharkhand, West Bengal, Delhi and Jammu and Kashmir.

== Etymology ==
Individuals who live by singing and music were referred to as Doma in Tantric scriptures. According to historian M.P. Joshi, the word Duma is connected to the sound of a drum. Its presumed root, ḍom, which is connected with drumming, is linked to damara and damaru, Sanskrit terms for "drum" and the Sanskrit verbal root डम् ḍam- 'to sound (as a drum)', perhaps a loan from Dravidian, e.g. Kannada ḍamāra 'a pair of kettle-drums', and Telugu ṭamaṭama 'a drum, tomtom'.

== History ==
The term doma is mentioned in Tantra scriptures as individuals who live by singing and music. During the reign of the Chand dynasty and Gorkha, all service castes were referred to as Doma and were prohibited from wearing gold and silver ornaments. They had to work as palanquin bearers, but they were prohibited from using palanquins at their weddings. They had to live in separate villages with different cremation sites and water sources. They had to bury the dead cows of others of which they ate flesh. During the British period, the British prohibited these discriminative practices. Social activist Lala Lajpat Rai and dalit leader Khusi Ram sought to reject low caste status and introduced the term Shilpkar to replace the pejorative Doma. They conducted purification rituals of Arya Samaj in which shilkars wore sacred threads (Janeu) and were allowed to use a palanquin in their wedding. Since then, in Uttarakhand, the Shilpkar replaced Dom in the official category. But it has done little to reduce the social stigma in the central Himalaya region.

Many nomadic and peripatetic groups in Uttar Pradesh are said to be of Doma origin such as the Bangali, Bhantu, Bazigar, Habura, Kanjar, and Sansi. It could also be that the term Doma is generically used to describe any peripatetic nomad, as all of the aforementioned groups are distinct and strictly endogamous. Some speak a dialect or argot of their own, while others speak the prevailing dialect or language.

=== Dom in Kumaon ===
During the Gorkha rule in the Himalayan regions, particularly in Kumaon, Doms and other communities classified as untouchables faced severe social discrimination and harsh punishments under a rigid caste system. These communities were historically subordinated to the twice-born castes, namely Brahmins, Rajputs, and Khas Rajputs.

One of the strict social taboos enforced during this period was related to the hukkah (a traditional smoking pipe). If a Dom or any untouchable individual touched the hukkah of a member of the twice-born castes, it was considered an act of pollution and caste defilement. Under Gorkha authority, such an act was deemed a capital offense, and the offender could be sentenced to death.

In addition to this, other actions such as slaying a cow (considered sacred in Hindu tradition) or violating caste boundaries also carried the death penalty. These laws reinforced the strict caste hierarchy and maintained the dominance of the upper castes in both religious and social spheres.

== Occupations ==
=== Andhra Pradesh ===
The Dom originally hails from the hilly tract of Visakhapatnam in Andhra Pradesh, were known for their occupation as drummers and are often considered "untouchables" in the caste system due to their historical role in disposing of bodies, including both animal and human remains.

=== Chhattisgarh ===
In Jashpur district of Chhattisgarh, the Dom were rulers from the 16th century to 18th century, until the defeat of king Raibhan of the Dom dynasty by Sujan Rai of Sonpur who established Jashpur State.

=== Delhi ===
The Dom were engaged in the occupation of beating drums in marriage ceremonies in Delhi of caste hindus. But marriages of high caste are facilitated by a Brahmin priest where a drum is not beaten. In Delhi, Dom women facilitate marriages of Bhangi caste by singing and drum beating as Brahmin do not facilitate marriages of Bhangi caste as they are considered untouchable.

=== Gilgit-Baltistan ===
In Hunza Valley of Gilgit-Baltistan, these people are called Bericho, Dom, or Doma. The Dom identity developed out of their work as musicians. They are a heterogeneous group, descended from a number of families that took up service with the various local rulers. The Dom belong to the Nizari Ismaili sect in Hunza.

=== Rajasthan ===
In Rajasthan, the Kalbelia tribe is engaged in dance and snake charming.

=== Uttarakhand ===
During the Chand and Gurkha dynasties (c. 700-1816 CE) in northern India, including regions that are now part of Uttarakhand, the term 'Dom' collectively referred to various occupational groups, including artisans and professional entertainers such as singers and musicians. Members of Dom castes were also involved in the disposal of dead animals, including cows.

=== Uttar Pradesh ===
In Varanasi, the city in Uttar Pradesh, the Dom perform the most important task of cremation of dead bodies. According to puranic legend, Raja Harishchandra was purchased by Kallu Dom and Harishchandra was working under him. However, according to another legend, Harishchandra was said to have been sold to a Chandala, and the Chandala entrusted him with the responsibility of overseeing the cremation ground (shmashana).

== Demographics ==
=== India ===
In Odisha, there were around 706,000 Doms according to the 2011 Census of India.

In Uttar Pradesh, Dom as a Scheduled Caste had a population of 110,353 according to the 2011 Census of India.

In Jammu and Kashmir, Dom are also called Mahasha had a population of 193,803 according to the 2011 Census of India.

In West Bengal, Doms numbered 316,337 at the 2001 Census of India and were 1.7 percent of the scheduled caste population of West Bengal. The same census found overall 46.0 percent of Doms (aged 7 and up) were literate. Along gender lines, 58.9 percent of males and 32.6 percent of females were found by the census to be literate.

=== Nepal ===
The Central Bureau of Statistics of Nepal classifies the Dom as a subgroup within the broader social group of Madheshi Dalits. At the time of the 2011 Nepal census, 13,268 people (0.1% of the population of Nepal) were Dom. The frequency of Doms by province was as follows: Madhesh Province (0.2%) and Koshi Province (0.1%), zero percent in other provinces.

The frequency of Doms was higher than national average (0.1%) in the following districts: Saptari (0.3%), Dhanusha (0.2%), Mahottari (0.2%), Parsa (0.2%), Siraha (0.2%) and Sunsari (0.2%).

== Present ==
The traditional occupation of Dom was making musical instruments and households items of bamboo. They still make musical instruments and households items of bamboo. But due to the advent of electronic music, sales of musical instruments have dwindled.

=== Official classification ===
Dom are listed as Scheduled Caste for reservation in India (positive affirmative action in the government jobs) in Indian state of Uttar Pradesh, Bihar, Odisha and West Bengal.

=== Diaspora ===
- Dom people, mainly Middle Eastern descendants of the Dom
  - Abdal Doms in Turkey
  - Doms in Egypt
  - Ghorbati Doms in Iran and Afghanistan
  - Doms in Iraq
  - Doms in Israel
  - Doms in Jordan
  - Doms in Lebanon
  - Doms in Libya
  - Doms in Sudan
  - Doms in Syria
  - Doms in Tunisia
    - Lyuli and Garachi subgroup of Ghorbati
- Romani people, mainly European descendants of the Dom
  - Timeline of Romani history
  - History of the Romani people
    - Roma Route, research project in Europe
  - Romani diaspora
    - List of Romani settlements
    - List of Romani people
    - Sinti, Romanis in Germany, France and Italy and Central Europe,
- Zott, Arabic term for gypsies, Romani people, and Dom people
  - Zuṭṭ, Arabicised form of Jat people

== Notable people ==
- Heera Dom, 19th century poet in India

== See also ==
- Nomads of India
- Nomadic tribes in India
