= Ethnic groups in the Middle East =

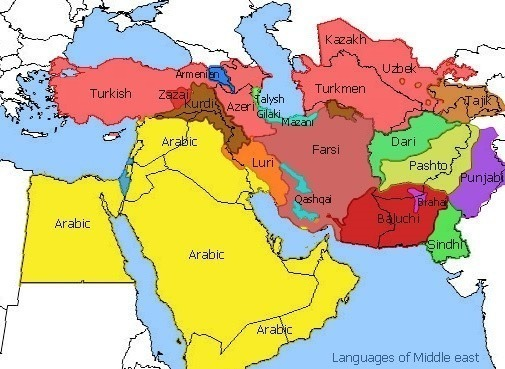
Ethnolinguistic distribution in Eastern Europe, Central and Southwest Asia of the Turkic, Caucasian, Afroasiatic (Hamito-Semitic) and Indo-European families.

Ethnic groups in the Middle East are ethnolinguistic groupings in the "transcontinental" region that is commonly a geopolitical term designating the intercontinental region comprising West Asia (including Cyprus) without the South Caucasus, and also comprising Egypt in North Africa. The Middle East has historically been a crossroad of different cultures and languages.

Since the 1960s, the changes in political and economic factors, especially the enormous oil wealth in the region and conflicts, have significantly altered the ethnic composition of groups in the region. While some ethnic groups have been present in the region for millennia, others have arrived fairly recently through immigration. The largest ethnic groups in the region are Arabs, Turks, Persians, Kurds, and Azerbaijanis but there are dozens of other ethnic groups that have hundreds of thousands, and sometimes millions of members.

Other indigenous, religious, or minority ethnic groups include: Antiochians, Armenians, Assyrians, Arameans in the Qalamoun Mountains, Baloch, Copts, Druze, Gilaks, Greeks (including Cypriots and Pontians) Hazaras, Jews, Kawliya, Laz, Lurs, Mandaeans, Maronites, Mazanderanis, Mhallami, Nawar, Pashtuns, Pamiris, Samaritans, Shabaks, Tajiks, Talysh, Tats, Turkmens, Yazidis, and Zazas.

Diaspora ethnic groups living in the region include: Albanians, Bengalis, Britons, Bosniaks, Chechens, Chinese, Circassians, Crimean Tatars, Filipinos, French people, Georgians, Indians, Indonesians, Italians, Malays, Malayali, Pakistanis, Punjabis, Romanians, Romani, Serbs, Sikhs, Sindhis, Somalis, Sri Lankans, and sub-Saharan Africans.

== Demographics ==
Countries	Demographics
Bahrain	Ethnic groups in Bahrain
Cyprus	Ethnic groups in Cyprus
Egypt	Ethnic groups in Egypt
Iran	Ethnic groups in Iran
Iraq	Ethnic groups in Iraq
Israel	Ethnic groups in Israel
Jordan	Ethnic groups in Jordan
Kuwait	Ethnic groups in Kuwait
Lebanon	Ethnic groups in Lebanon
Oman	Ethnic groups in Oman
Palestine	Ethnic groups in Palestine
Qatar	Ethnic groups in Qatar
Saudi Arabia	Ethnic groups in Saudi Arabia
Syria	Ethnic groups in Syria
Turkey	Ethnic groups in Turkey
United Arab Emirates	Ethnic groups in the United Arab Emirates
Yemen	Ethnic groups in Yemen

== Middle East ==
Egyptians

- Copts

Arabs

- Arabs in Turkey
- Iranian Arabs
- Israeli Arabs

Sub-Saharan Africans

- Afro-Arabs
- Ethiopian Jews
- Nubians
- Sudanese in Israel

Jews

- Israeli Jews
- Ashkenazi Jews
- Ethiopian Jews
- Mizrahi Jews
- Sephardi Jews
- Yemenite Jews

Samaritans

Aramaic-speaking peoples

- Arameans
  - Arameans in Israel
- Assyrians
  - Assyrians in Armenia
  - Assyrians in Georgia
  - Assyrians in Iran
  - Assyrians in Iraq
  - Assyrians in Israel
  - Assyrians in Jordan
  - Assyrians in Lebanon
  - Assyrians in Syria
  - Assyrians in Turkey
- Mandaeans
- Maronites

Indo-European speaking groups

- Albanians
  - Albanians in Egypt
  - Albanians in Syria
- Armenians
  - Armenians in the Middle East
  - Armenians in Egypt
  - Armenians in Iran
  - Armenians in Iraq
  - Armenians in Israel
  - Armenians in Lebanon
  - Armenians in Syria
  - Armenians in Turkey
- Greeks
  - Greek Cypriots
  - Greeks in Egypt
  - Greeks in Israel
  - Greeks in Lebanon
  - Greeks in Syria
- Iranian peoples
  - Ajam of Bahrain
  - Ajam of Iraq
- Kurds
  - Shabaks
  - Yazidis
- Italians
  - Levantines
  - Italian Egyptians
  - Italians in Lebanon
- Romani
  - Dom
  - Kawliya
  - Nawar–Romani people in Syria
  - Romani people in Egypt

Turkic peoples

- Azerbaijanis
- Iraqi Turkmen
- Syrian Turkmen
- Turks in Egypt
- Turks in Israel
- Turks in Jordan
- Turks in Lebanon

== Anatolia ==
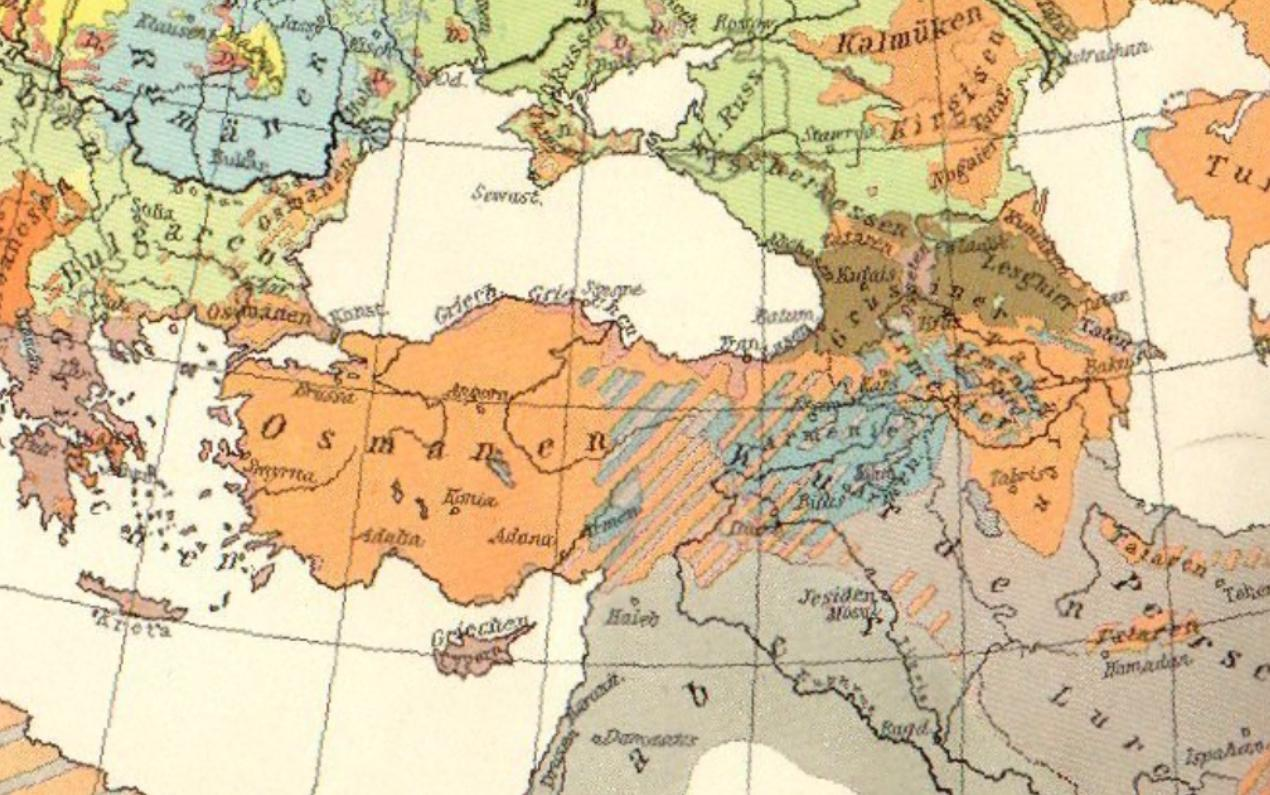
An ethnic map of Asia Minor and Caucasus in 1914

=== Romani ===
- Dom
- Romani people in Turkey

=== Zazas ===
Kartvelian peoples

- Georgians in Turkey
- Laz people in Turkey

=== Jews in Turkey ===
Turkic peoples

- Azerbaijanis in Turkey
- Crimean Tatars in Turkey
- Gagauz people
- Turks

Muhacir

- Muslims from the Caucasus (Peoples of the Caucasus in Turkey)
- Muslims from the Balkans (mainly Albanians, Bosniaks, and Pomaks)

== Cyprus ==
- Armenians in Cyprus
- Greek Cypriots
- Maronite Cypriots
- Turkish Cypriots

== Iranian Plateau ==
The geographic distribution of modern Iranian languages

=== Iranian peoples ===
- Persians

=== Kurds in Iran ===
  - Feylis
  - Kaka'is
  - Kurds of Khorasan
  - Laks

=== Tats ===
Kartvelian peoples

- Georgians in Iran

=== Jews in Iran ===
- Persian Jews

=== Mandaeans ===
Turkic peoples

- Azerbaijanis in Iran
- Qashqai
- Turkmen in Iran

== Diaspora populations ==
Because of the low population of many of the Arab States of the Persian Gulf and the demand for labor created by the large discoveries of oil in these countries there has been a steady stream of immigration to the region (mainly from South Asia). Ethnic groups which comprise the largest portions of this immigration include Afghans, Albanians, Armenians, Bengalis, Bosniaks, Britons, Chinese, Filipinos, Greeks, Indians, Indonesians, Italians, Malays, Nepalis, Pakistanis, Punjabis, Sikhs, Sindhis, Somalis, Sri Lankans, and Sub-Saharan Africans. Many of these people are denied certain political and legal rights in the countries in which they live and frequently face mistreatment by the native-born citizens of the host countries.

== See also ==
- Arab diaspora
- Arab world
- Armenian diaspora
- Assyrian diaspora
- Demographics of the Arab League
- Demographics of the Middle East
- Ethnic groups in Asia
- Ethnic groups in the Caucasus
- Ethnic groups in Europe
- Genetic history of the Middle East
- Iranian diaspora
- Iranian peoples
- Jewish diaspora
- Jews
- Turkic peoples
