= Doms in Palestine =

Ethnic group

دوم
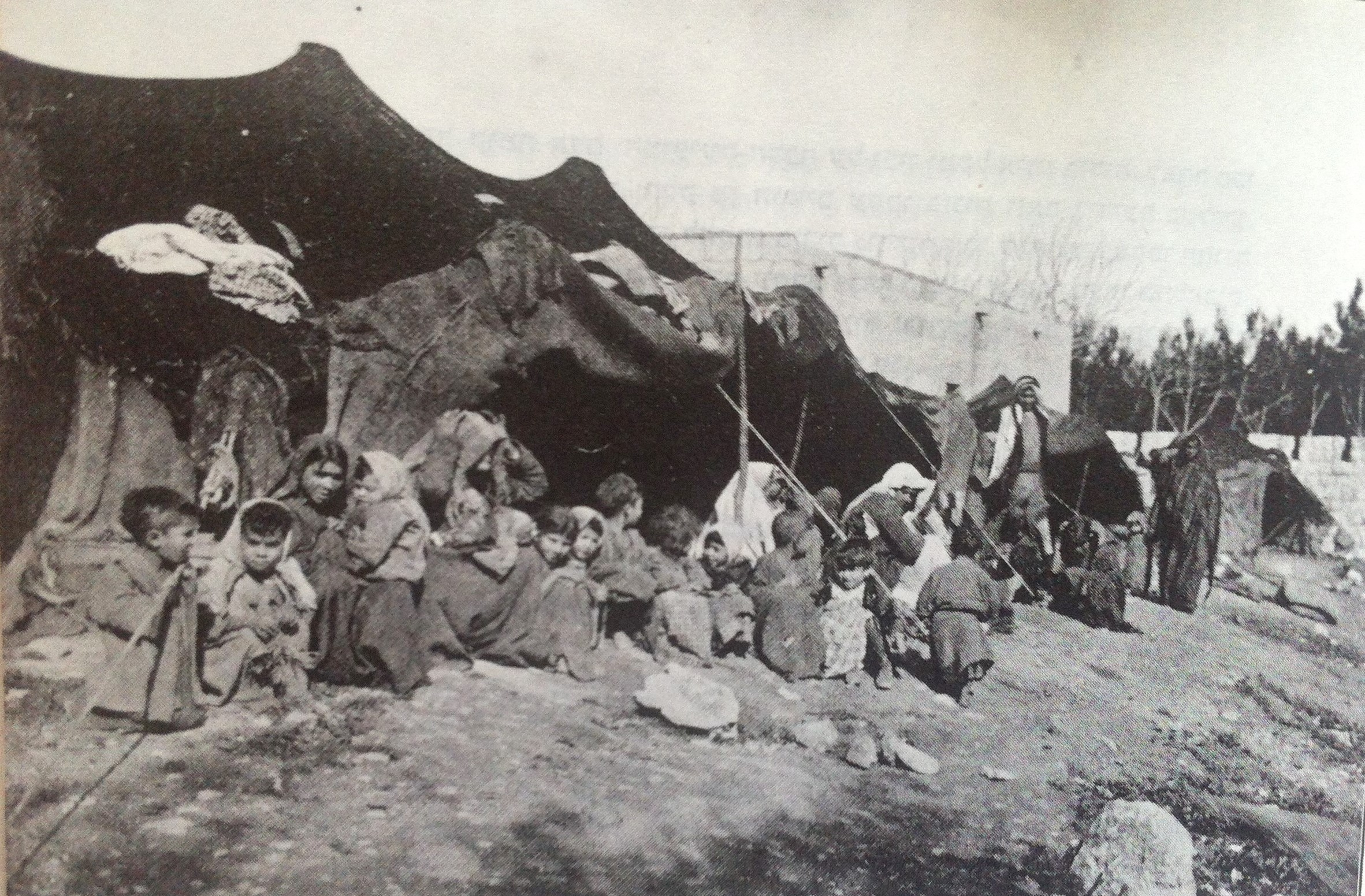
- Domari encampment north of the Damascus Gate in Jerusalem (1914)

Total population
- 12,000 (2022)

Regions with significant populations
- Jerusalem

Languages
- Domari, Palestinian Arabic

Religion
- Christianity, Islam

The Doms (also called Domi; Arabic: دومي / ALA-LC: Dūmī, دومري / Dūmrī, Ḍom / ضوم or دوم, or sometimes also called Doms) are a community in Palestine. They are descended from the Dom caste, with origins in the Indian subcontinent. They are present across the Middle East and North Africa because of historic migration. The traditional language of the Dom is Domari, an endangered Indo-Aryan language; the Dom an Indo-Aryan ethnic group.

The Doms were formerly grouped with other traditionally itinerant ethnic groups originating from medieval India: the Rom and Lom peoples. However, these groups left India at different times and used different routes. The Domari language has a separate origin in India from Romani, and Doms are not closer to the Romani people than other Indians, such as Gujaratis. Dom people do not identify themselves as Romanis.

== History ==
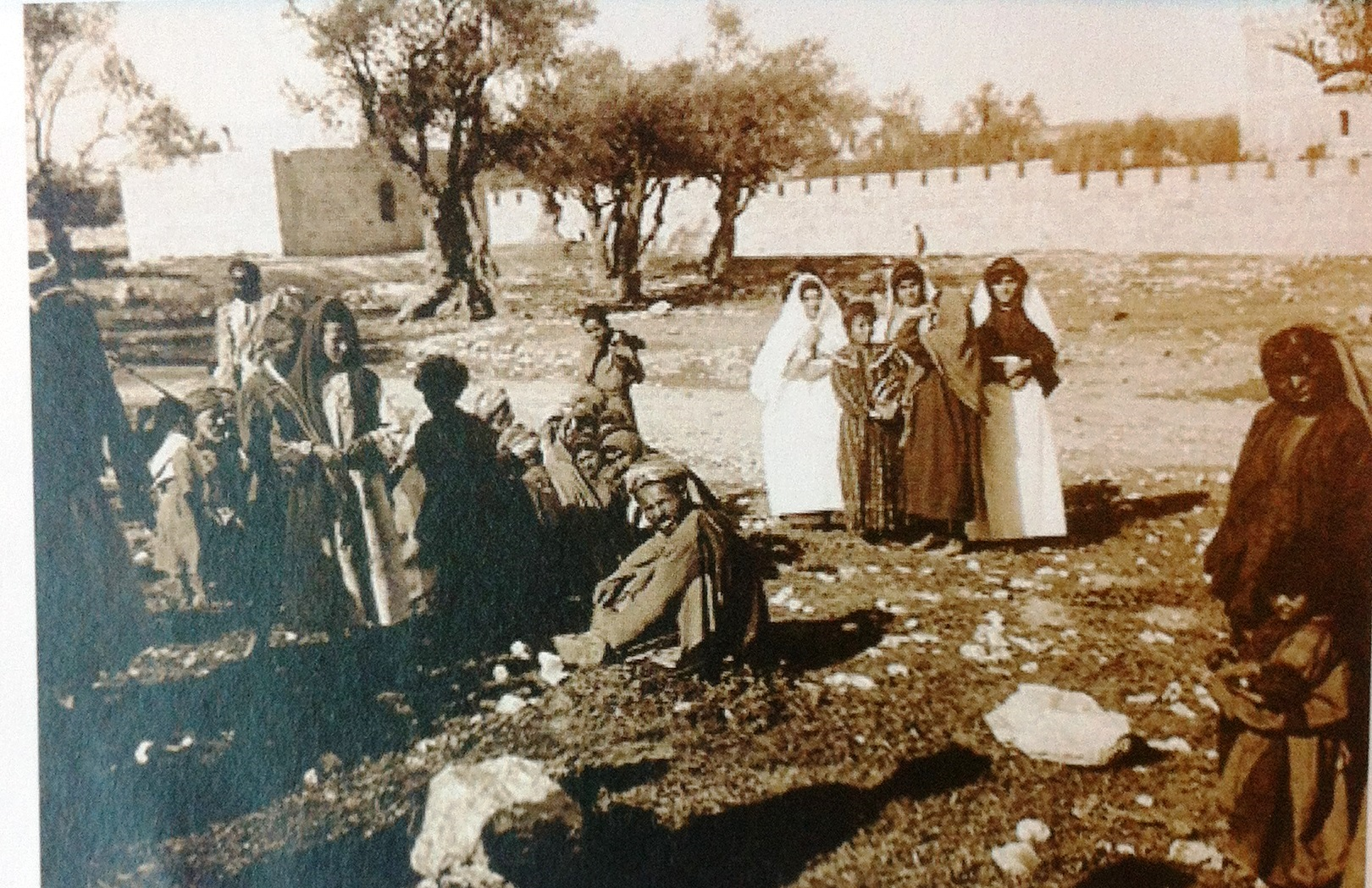
Dom women and children near École Biblique in the 1920s (Mandatory Palestine)

The Doms left India between the third and tenth centuries. They have lived in Palestine for at least four centuries, arriving either with Saladin or during Ottoman Empire rule. They converted to Islam and were known as horse breeders and blacksmiths.

According to a report by Wafa and the Jerusalem Domari Society, between 4000 and 5000 Doms were expelled in the 1948 Palestinian expulsion and flight, most settled in Jordan, specifically in the city of Amman.

In modern times, they have low employment and education, often living in poverty. Fewer than half make it to secondary school, and 80% of Dom men are unemployed.

== Demographics ==
There are few accurate reports on the number of Doms in Palestine. There are an estimated 7000 Doms in the West Bank and 900 in the Gaza Strip, as of 2013. As of 2022, around 12000 Doms resided in the West Bank, Gaza Strip, and East Jerusalem.

98% of Doms in Palestine are Muslim and 2% are Christian.

Doms are not recognized as a separate ethnic group by the Israeli Ministry of interior, but rather as Arabs. Most Doms in East Jerusalem have permanent resident status but have not become Israeli citizens.

== Racism ==
The Dom face significant discrimination and racism from the larger Palestinian population in the Gaza strip and in the Palestinian territories. They face comments about their dance style being immoral. Dom weddings mix genders, revealing they are not from a majority society. Palestinian families do not allow marriage with Doms, leading many to conceal their identity. They also face marginalization in schools, which impacts employment prospects and keeps the community in poverty. Women resort to begging and men play in musical groups at weddings. They are denied representation in the government and institutions, unlike in Jordan. They do not receive much from international aid. One report stated "I was regaled with tales of being spit on in the street, taunting by teachers in schools, and blatant work-place discrimination"

They are used as a pejorative for other people. Doms are expected to perform at their best to be accepted in society. Slurs such as "al-Nawar" are used.

In 2000, the Domari Society of Gypsies in Jerusalem was founded, with the aim of combating discrimination. A community Center for Doms was opened in Shuafat, Jerusalem, with support from the Dom Research Center, it offers courses and free resources to members of the Dom community.

== See also ==
- Doms in Egypt
- Doms in Iraq
- Doms in Israel
- Doms in Jordan
- Doms in Lebanon
- Doms in Libya
- Doms in Sudan
- Doms in Syria
- Doms in Tunisia
- Zott

== Sources ==
- Matras, Yaron; Tenser, Anton, eds. (2020). The Palgrave Handbook of Romani Language and Linguistics. Basingstoke: Palgrave Macmillan. doi:10.1007/978-3-030-28105-2. ISBN 978-3-030-28107-6.
