= Jalali =

Jalali may refer to:

== People ==
- Jalali (surname)

== Places ==
- Jalali, Uttar Pradesh, a town and a nagar panchayat in Aligarh district in the state of Uttar Pradesh, India
- Jalali, Uttarakhand, a small town situated in Almora district in the state of Uttarakhand, India
- Jalali, Hormozgan, a village in Hormozgan Province, Iran
- Jalali, Razavi Khorasan, a village in Razavi Khorasan Province, Iran
- Jalali, alternate name of Jalalieh, Razavi Khorasan, a village in Razavi Khorasan Province, Iran

== Other uses ==
- Jalali calendar, an Iranian calendar
- Jalali (Kurdish tribe), a tribe of Eastern Turkey and Northwestern Iran
- Celali rebellions, in the Ottoman Empire

== See also ==
- Jalal (disambiguation)
