= Abdal people (West Asia) =

Ethnoreligious group

Abdals
Teberler

Regions with significant populations
- Turkey, Jordan, Syria

Languages
- Turkish

Religion
- Islam (Alevism)

Related ethnic groups
- Millets

The Abdals (Turkish: Abdallar) are a largely Turkish-speaking ethnic group found in much of Anatolia and parts of the Balkans and Syria, who follow an itinerant lifestyle. This lifestyle is closely connected with the activity of music making at weddings and circumcision parties. Other occupations associated with the Abdal include tinning, basket making and sieve manufacture.

== Names ==
Abdals use the endonym Teber. Abdals were registered in Ottoman records as Turkoman Gypsies (Ottoman Turkish: Turkmān Ḳibṭīleri), which denoted Abdals’ tribal affiliations with Turkomans but different ethnic or social origin.

== History ==
According to Orhan Köprülü, the Abdals of Turkey might be descended from the Hepthalites. Albert von Le Coq mentions the relation between Abdals of Adana and Äynus of East Turkestan, by them having some common words, and by both referring to themselves as Abdals and speaking an exclusive language among themselves.

The three most notable characteristics of the group are its close relationship with the Alevi sect, its use of a secret language (Abdoltili/Teberce) or argot and its wide distribution. It seems that the name Abdal was associated with Alevi dervishes of Central Anatolia, whose existence is first recorded in the 16th century. These Abdalan-ı Rum were extreme Alevis practising celibacy and withdrawal from the world. Their unorthodox behavior led to their suppression by the Ottoman authorities. According to the Abdal themselves, their ancestors once came from North India and went to Afghanistan, Iran and Central Asia and then to Ottoman Anatolia and intermarried with Turkmen tribes. They say they are not like the Romani people in Turkey and distance themselves from them.

In the 15th century, the Abdals were gradually excluded from the process of centralization and transformation of the Ottoman Empire into a bureaucratic empire, and as a result of the establishment of Sunni Islam in Edirne and, from 1453, in Istanbul, they took on an irregular character. With the establishment of the Safavid State in Iran and the spread of Qizilbash activity in Anatolia, the Abdals became integrated in the 17th century with the Shamlu Qizilbash movement.

The Ottoman state started to collect Gypsy (Turkish: Kıpti) poll tax (Turkish: cizye) from Abdal communities in Kastamonu, Çankırı-Tosya, Ankara, Malatya, Harput, Antep, and Aleppo no later than late 17th century. Abdals in Teke (modern-day Antalya) were affiliated with another fiscal category, ifraz-ı zulkadriyye, until 1858, when the Ottoman reformers incorporated the fixed tax of relevant groups into the Gypsy poll tax.

== Language ==
Abdals in Turkey mostly speak a dialect of Turkish with additional vocabulary. The Abdal language consists of borrowing from Hindustani, Persian, and Rumelian Romani words, with an essentially Turkish and Turkmen grammar.

== Society and culture ==
Abdals would traditionally have a symbiotic relationship with Turkmen but also Kurdish tribes, playing a particular role as musicians, entertainers, minstrels, jewelers and magicians, whereas they would be accommodated by the people they were living together with. Abdals wouldn't intermarry with these people, yet they would be allowed to stay within the larger community.

== See also ==
- Doma (caste)
- Tahtacı
- Hephthalites
- Ghorbati
- Mugat Ghorbati
- Garachi
- Romani
- Lom people
- Dom people
- Äynu people
