= Dalak =

Dalak may refer to:

- Dalak, Afghanistan, located in Bamyan
- Dalak, Iran, a village in Kurdistan Province, Iran
- Dalak people, an ethnic group found in western Afghanistan
- Count Dalak Kenola, a fictional character in Frank Herbert's Dune universe, father of Farad'n

== See also ==
- Dahlak Archipelago, an island group in the Red Sea
- Dalek, fictional aliens in the British television series Doctor Who
