= Doms in Syria =

Dom / Nawar in Syria
Total population
- 250–300,000 (est.)

Languages
- Domari and Syrian Arabic

Religion
- Islam

Related ethnic groups
- Kawliya

The Domari-speaking (or rather, historically speaking) community in Syria, commonly identified as Dom and Nawar, is estimated to number 100–250,000 or 250–300,000 people. The vast majority is sedentary. There are semi-nomadic groups, some moving outside the country. In Aleppo, the Dom community is probably the largest, while they are reported to live in Damascus, Homs and Latakia as well. The community is highly marginalised in society, and they are referred to as Qurbāṭ (ʾərbāṭ in Aleppo) and Qarač in the northern part, and Nawar (widely used in the Levant) elsewhere. These terms are used for various groups that mainly share socio-economic profile. The community is divided into clans.

The Domari are believed to have migrated from India via Persia. They seem to have been an Indian nomadic caste specializing in metalwork and entertainment. The language is Indo-Aryan, closely related to Central Indian and Dardic languages. The Dom language (Domari) in the Middle East is known as Nawari. Domari shows Turkic, Kurdish and Arabic influence. There has been a language shift into Arabic.

The exonym "Nawar" could be used sometimes offensively, denoting a contemptible and immoral lifestyle associating them with beggars, itinerants, and thieves.

During the Syrian civil war, there were several reports regarding Syrian Dom immigrants in Turkey, Lebanon and Jordan.

== See also ==
- Doms in Egypt
- Doms in Iraq
- Doms in Israel
- Doms in Jordan
- Doms in Lebanon
- Doms in Libya
- Doms in Palestine
- Doms in Sudan
- Doms in Tunisia
- Zott

== Sources ==
- Matras, Yaron (1 October 2012). A Grammar of Domari. Walter de Gruyter. pp. 1–. ISBN 978-3-11-029142-1.
- Williams, Allen (2001). "The Gypsies of Syria". KURI. 1 (4). Dom Research Center. Archived from the original on 23 January 2005.
- Herin, Bruno (2012). "The Domari Language of Aleppo (Syria)". Linguistic Discovery. 10 (2). doi:10.1349/ps1.1537-0852.a.412. ISSN 1537-0852.
- Berland, Joseph C.; Rao, Aparna (2004). Customary Strangers: New Perspectives on Peripatetic Peoples in the Middle East, Africa, and Asia. Greenwood Publishing Group. pp. 71–74. ISBN 978-0-89789-771-6.
- Law, Ian (2014). Mediterranean Racisms: Connections and Complexities in the Racialization of the Mediterranean Region. Palgrave Macmillan. pp. 139–. ISBN 978-1-137-26348-3.
- Tarlan, K.V. (2015). From The Occupation of Iraq to ” The Arab Spring ”: Gypsies in the Middle East
- Tarlan, K.V. (2016). The Dom Gypsies: “Other” Refugees of Syria
- Tarlan, K.V. (2015).Irak'ın işgalinden "Arap Baharı"na Ortadoğu'da Çingeneler: Öteki sığınmacılar. Birikim Dergisi,
- Tarlan, K.V., Foggo, H., (2016). Dom Migrants from Syria: Living at the Bottom on the Road amid Poverty and Discrimination. Ankara: Development Workshop,
- Tarlan, K.V. (2018). Encouraging Integration and Social Cohesion of Syrian Dom Immigrants Proposal for a Regional Social Inclusion Strategy Turkey, Lebanon, and Jordan. Gaziantep: Kırkayak Kültür
