= Lom language =

Lom may be:

- Lomavren, the language of the Lom people of Armenia
- the Lom dialect of Bangka Malay
