= Jakati =

Jakati may be:

- Jakati language or Inku language, an Indo-Aryan language of Afghanistan
- Shadab Jakati, an Indian cricketer
