= Mugat Ghorbati =

Branch of Ghorbati people

Mugat Ghorbati
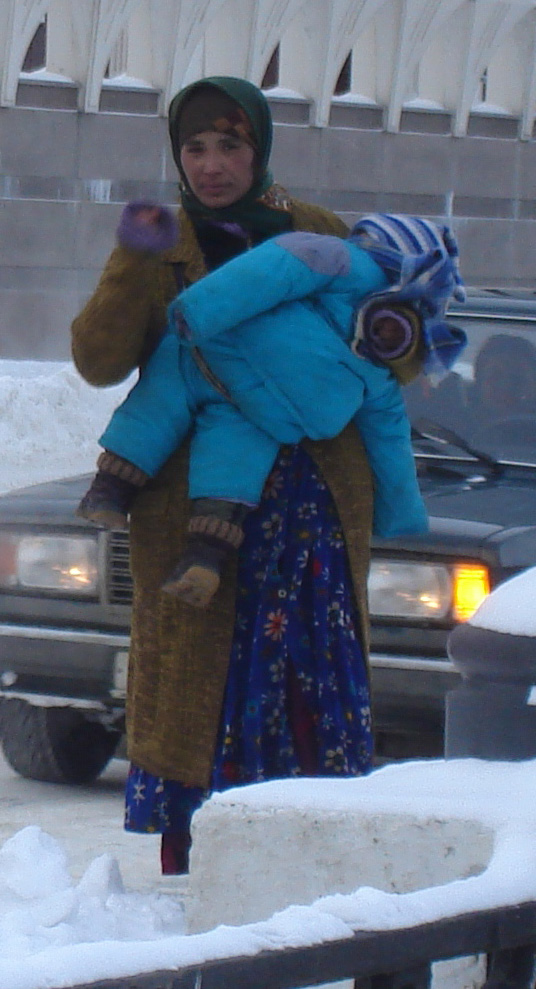
- Mugat Ghorbati woman with child at the Bolaq embankment, Kazan, Russia.

Total population
- 23,500

Regions with significant populations
- Uzbekistan: 12,000
- Tajikistan: 4,600
- Kyrgyzstan: 990
- Russia: 486

Languages
- Persian Kowli, Tajik, Uzbek, and Russian

Religion
- Sunni Islam

Related ethnic groups
- Other Ghorbati, Abdals, Doms, Romani, and Loms

The Mugat Ghorbati are a branch of the Ghorbati people inhabiting Central Asia. They live in Tajikistan, Uzbekistan, Turkmenistan, Kazakhstan, and Kyrgyzstan, Afghanistan, and Russia.

The Mugat community is closed to entry by non-Mugat.

Although commonly referred to as "Lyuli" and "Jughi," these terms are considered pejorative by the Mugat. They are also sometimes called "Multoni", "Gurbath", or "Central Asian Gypsies".

The Mugats native language is primarily Tajik, but most are bilingual in Uzbek and/or Russian. Persian Kowli is used by some as an argot. They practice Sunni Islam.

The Mugats can be subdivided into their historic regions. They can then be further divided into their clan or "Tupar," which in turn is made of individual extended family groups known as "Avdol".

== Etymology ==
There are several names for the Mugat: Jughi, Multani, or Luli. However, they refer to themselves as Mugat (Мугат) or Mughat (Persian: مگت), as well as Gurbet (Arabic: غربت), which means "lonely".

The name Mugat may derive from an Arabic term for Zoroastrians (Literally “fire cult followers” or "Heathen"). Although Mugats have been adherants to Islam for centuries, they reject this etymology.

The exact origin of the name "Mugat Ghorbati" is unclear, but may be related to a medieval Islamic guild called the Banu Sassan. This group renamed themselves the "Bani al Ghuraba," or "Tribe of Exile," and some words in Mugat argots can be traced back to their texts, suggesting that "Ghorbati" may derive from the Arabic "Ghuraba (Strangers)".

The term Multani signifies a person who originates from the city of Multan (in modern-day Pakistan), because some of the Mugat emigrated after the Siege of Multan, 1296–1297 to Central Asia.

== History ==
Some Mugat (Multani) originate from the Northern Indian Subcontinent. According to local traditions held by the Mugat, their community already existed in the region by the time of Timur (14th Century). In time, the Mugat began adopting the customs, languages, and the Islamic faith of their Central Asian neighbors. Many Mugat were nomadic until the early 20th century, when they began living in urban areas.

The Mugat had a presence in China during the Yuan and Ming dynasties until vanishing from the historical record by the early Qing period. They were referred to as the Luoli Huihui. Hui during this time had not yet become synonymous with Islam as they are today.

The term Hui Hui country (回回國) was originally used by Chinese in the Yuan dynasty to refer to the Khwarazmian Empire in Central Asia. During this time Hui Hui became a catchall term used for various people groups west of China including Jews, Christians, Hindus, Muslims, and the Mugat.

== Culture ==
Historically the Mugat used to work as wandering musical entertainers, fortune-tellers, peddlers and beggars. Women also worked as tailors for non-Mugat women, including making hairnets for veils. Some subgroups specialized in other trades like woodworking. Modern Mugat are now settled and work in diverse occupations including in education, factories, business and more.

The Mugat are devout Sunni Muslims, but some traces of pre-Islamic beliefs have continued to endure.

The Mugat face discrimination from others and social marginalization. Some suffer from poverty and isolation.

== Tajikistan ==
2,234 Mugat lived in Tajikistan in 2010.

== Uzbekistan ==
There are approximately 12,000 - 20,000 Mugat living in Uzbekistan. While children converse in their native language or mixed speech at home, poor educational standards and poverty have gradually reduced fluency rates in favour of Russian or Uzbek.

== Kyrgyzstan ==
The Mugat live in the south of Kyrgyzstan, in Osh Region. Their living standard is extremely low. Many Mugat have no official documents. Education is conducted in Russian, Kyrgyz, or Uzbek, but many Mugat lack education. Mugat society is working towards improvement of their living standards, education and knowledge of Kyrgyz and Russian, and preservation of their culture.

== Kazakhstan ==
The Kazakh Mugat, also known as Kazakh Luli, are a small ethnic group in Kazakhstan. They are a subgroup of the broader Mugat ethnic minority originating from the Fergana Valley and the southeastern regions of Kazakhstan (Almaty Region and Zambil). Their true population size is unknown, but is estimated to be only a few hundred. They speak a dialect of the Kazakh language and most self identify as Kazakh and are integrated into Kazakh society. The Kazakh Mugat have faced social, economic, and political marginalization and discrimination throughout their history, and their cultural survival remains a challenge in modern-day Kazakhstan.

== Afghanistan ==
Afghan Mugat Ghorbati (known as Ghorbat) find their origins in the late 19th century and early 20th century when many Mugats emigrated from what was at the time Russian Turkestan into Afghanistan. Many Ghorbat names preserve their connection to their families traditional region.

== Russia ==
Starting from the early 1990s, the Mugat began migrating into Southern Russian cities, most noticeably around railway stations and markets. At first, Russians mistakenly identified them as Tajik refugees or ethnic Uzbeks due to their traditional Central Asian robes. Russian Roma emphasize that the Mugat are distinct from them and not part of the Romani society and culture. They are a frequent target of Russian far right skinheads.

== Iran ==
Mugat Ghorbati in Iran
Languages
- Mazanderani, Persian

Religion
- Islam

Related ethnic groups
- Abdal of Turkey

The Mugat Ghorbati in Iran are a nomadic group, who believe they once came from Egypt. They live primarily in the Mazandaran Province of Iran and in Central Asia. They are often referred to as "Central Asian Gypsies" and frequently confused with the Roma, Doms, or Loms.
