= Doms in Sudan =

Ethnic group

Total population
- 50,000

Languages
- Domari, Sudanese Arabic

Religion
- Islam

Related ethnic groups
- Dom people, Nawar people, Kawliya

Doms in Sudan speak the Domari language. They immigrated to the territory of the present day Sudan from South Asia, particularly from India, in Byzantine times. Doms self-segregated themselves for centuries from the dominant culture of Sudan, who view them as dishonorable though clever. Historically, Doms in Sudan have provided musical entertainment as weddings and other celebrations. The Doms in Sudan include subgroups like Nawar, Halebi and Ghagar.

== Modern documentation ==
Little modern and historical information is known or written about them, but Mohamed Fadil in 2018 documented their lifestyle and culture.

== See also ==
- Doms in Egypt
- Doms in Iraq
- Doms in Israel
- Doms in Jordan
- Doms in Lebanon
- Doms in Libya
- Doms in Palestine
- Doms in Syria
- Doms in Tunisia
- Zott
