= Peripatetic groups of Afghanistan =

Nomadic ethnic populations

There are several ethnic groups in Afghanistan which traditionally lead a peripatetic life; they are nomadic and their main occupations centre around providing services to the settled populations they travel among, like peddling particular goods or performing music. In this way, they contrast both with settled populations and pastoralist nomads. They are generally viewed as being of low social status and are known to outsiders as Jāts, a derogatory term that none of the groups use as a self-designation.

== Name ==
The term Jāt is derogatory and none of the peripatetic groups uses it for itself, although they do employ it in reference to other peripatetic communities. It is unclear how these distinct groups acquired the name Jāt. They are distinct from the Jat people in South Asia, including Jats of Balochistan.

== Social characteristics ==
Generally, what defines groups is a nomadic lifestyle, with their main occupation being the provision of services such as the manufacture and sale of agricultural implements, bangles, drums and winnowing trays as well as providing entertainment such as performing bears and monkeys, fortune-telling, singing. Most Jāts have a network of clients and customers scattered over a broad region, and they migrate between these known clients clusters, occasionally adding new ones. Secondly, each Jāt group specializes in a particular activity, for example the Ghorbat of western Afghanistan are sieve makers, shoe repairers and animal traders, while the Shadibaz peddle cloth, bangles and haberdashery.

These communities are endogamous and some have secret languages.

== Ethnic groups ==
Below is a brief overview of the main known groups of peripatetics. The information in this table, as well as in the rest of this article, is relevant to the situation in the 1970s. This is likely to have changed significantly in the turmoil since then.

Main groups
Ethnic Group	Region (in the 1970s)	Economy (in the 1970s)	Language	Religion
Ghorbat	found throughout Afghanistan	makers of sieves and rums, shoe repairers, animal traders, haberdashery, cloth peddling and bangle selling	Ghorbati	majority Shia, some Sunni
Shadibaz	eastern and northern Afghanistan	peddling cloth, haberdashery or bangles; leading performing bears and monkeys	Inku	Sunni
Vangawala	eastern and central Afghanistan including Uruzgan, Bamiyan and Dai Kundi	peddling bangles, cloth or haberdashery; jugglery and snake charming	Inku	Sunni
Baloch	northern, western and southern Afghanistan	prostitution, occasionally music and dance	Balochi	Sunni
Jalali	western and northern Afghanistan, mainly in Heart, Farah, Baghlan, Kunduz, Talogan and Badakhshan provinces	musicians, leading performing monkeys, occasionally begging	Inku	Sunni
Pikraj	northern and western Afghanistan	animal trade; peddling bangles	Inku	Sunni
Jogi	northern Afghanistan	begging, preparing and selling herbal medicines, agricultural labour	Mogatibey, Uzbek and Dari	Sunni
Mussali	eastern Afghanistan	agricultural labour		
Kutana			Pashto	
Shaikh Mohammadi	throughout Afghanistan	peddlers	Dari, secret language: Adurgari	Sunni

=== Baluch ===
The Baluch (Baluč) should not be confused with either the much larger ethnic group of the Baluch people (even though they speak the same language), or with one of the subgroups of the peripatetic Vangawala. The Baluch were also known as Chalu, Herātī and Jat-Baluch. Numbering approximately 2,500 individuals in the 1970s, they claim to have ultimately migrated from Balochistan. For a long time they were in association with the Jamshidi tribe, for whom they worked as blacksmiths and jewellers. This relationship came to an end with the droughts of the middle of the 1960s, the ensuing poverty reportedly driving them to prostitution and the provisions of entertainment, which were their chief occupations in the 1970s. Only some of the men played music, but all of the women were engaged in singing, dancing and prostitution. The latter activity was at that time stigmatised and illegal, but unlike many prostitutes in the settled areas, the Baluch women did not try to conceal their identity in public and dressed and behaved in a way that made them immediately recognisable as such. Women received clients in their summer camps, their husbands (or fathers if unmarried) setting the price and collecting the official earnings. Although some women did not like the job, many said they thought it was an easy way to get pleasure and money. The men stated they would have preferred it if their wives did not have to work as prostitutes, but they nonetheless were happy that they themselves did not have to work. Both the men and the women held their clients in "infinite contempt" and often referred to them as "the dogs". Polygyny was common in the group.

=== Ghorbat ===
The Ghorbat (Ġorbat) are the most widely dispersed peripatetic community, consisting of about 600 nuclear families as of the 1970s. Their origin is ultimately west-Iranian, and they speak local varieties of Persian in addition to Ghorbati (also known as Magadi or Qāzulāgi), a secret language with a heavy Persian base.

=== Jalali, Pikraj, Shadibaz and Vangawala ===
These four communities claim descent from ancestors who migrated in the 19th century from the Dera Ismail Khan and Dera Ghazi Khan areas of eastern Balochistan (nowadays Pakistan). The Jalali and the Pikraj give successive droughts and famines as the reason for their migration, while the Shadibaz and the Vangawala state that their ancestors were fleeing from blood feuds ultimately triggered by the abduction of kinswomen. All four groups speak closely related varieties of the Indo-Aryan Inku language, which is likely related to the Saraiki of their areas of origin.

The Jalali (Jalāli) were found in northeastern Afghanistan and numbered around 500 people divided into four lineages. Some were beggars, the better-off were peddlers of haberdashery. The women commonly sold fruit door to door, while some men were musicians or had monkeys which they trained "to dance and perform tricks".

The Pikraj (Pikrāj) numbered approximately 2,000 people in 1976. They wandered around the whole of Afghanistan north of the Hindukush. The major male occupation was trade in donkeys and horses, though some additionally fixed broken porcelain, and other – metal jewellery. In most places, the women peddled haberdashery and trinkets.

The Shadibaz (Šādibāz), also known as Shadiwan (Šādiwān), had a population of about 1,500 individuals divided into three descent groups. Their name, literally meaning "monkey-players" in the local Persian variety, reflects their main occupation, which consisted in training monkeys and then using them for performances. As this had started becoming less profitable, the men had increasingly been taking up other occupations like selling cloth, or working as agricultural labourers. The women on the other hand peddled glass and plastic bangles.

The Vangawala (Vaŋgāwālā) are known in Pashto as Bangṛiwāl or Banguḍifruš and in Dari as Čurifrūš. Comprising 3,000 people spread across five descent groups (Baluč, Čenār, Malek, Pešāwri, and Rati), they lived south of Hindukush and east of Helmand valley. Some families used to spend the winter in or near Peshawar in Pakistan. The women sold bangles, for which they were well known, while the men had various occupations: in some groups they engaged in small trade, in others they took up seasonal agricultural jobs, in others still they were smugglers, farmers, animal dealers, or performers specialising in juggling, magic or snake-charming.

=== Jogi ===
The Jōgī, or Jugī, are found in northern Afghanistan and are organised into four subgroups. Likely of Central Asian origin, they relate that their ancestors once travelled freely between Bukhara and Afghanistan. There are also Jogi groups still living in parts of neighbouring Tajikistan. In addition to Uzbek and Dari, they speak a language of their own called Mogatibey, alternatively known as Qāzulāgi and Ghurbati, which appears to be a secret language.

=== Mussali ===
The Mussali were concentrated in parts of Laghman Province, where they provided their labour during the busy late spring harvest season.

=== Sheikh Mohammadi ===
There are several unrelated groups of Sheikh Mohammadi (Šayx Mohammadi), and there is disagreement among them about which one can rightfully identify as such. The one thing they do have in common is their secret language Ādurgari, which is used in the presence of strangers. Otherwise they speak Pashto and Dari. The Sheikh Mohammadi claim descent from a legendary Sheikh Mohammad, also referred to as Sheikh Rohāni Bābā, who according to tradition lived in East Afghanistan and had magical powers.

== See also ==
- Dalak people

== Bibliography ==
- Hanifi, M. Jamil (2012). "Jāt". Encyclopædia Iranica.
- Olesen, A. (1987). "Peddling in East Afghanistan: Adaptive Strategies of the Peripatetic Sheikh Mohammadi". In Rao, Aparna (ed.). The Other Nomads: Peripatetic Minorities in Cross-Cultural Perspective. Cologne: Böhlau. pp. 35–63. ISBN 3-412-08085-3.
- Rao, Aparna (1986). "Peripatetic Minorities in Afghanistan: Image and Identity". In Orywal, Erwin (ed.). Die ethnischen Gruppen Afghanistans. Wiesbaden: L. Reichert. pp. 254–83. ISBN 3-88226-360-1.
- Rao, Aparna (1995). "Marginality and language use: the example of peripatetics in Afghanistan". Journal of the Gypsy Lore Society. 5. 5 (2): 69–95.
