= Doms in Egypt =

Total population
- 100,000 (estimated)

Regions with significant populations
- Upper Egypt, Cairo and Alexandria

Languages
- Domari, Egyptian Arabic

Religion
- Islam (main religion), Christianity (1%)

Related ethnic groups
- Romani people, Nawar people, Kawliya

The Dom (دوم) people migrated from South Asia to the territory of present-day Egypt. The assumed consensus was that they were originally from Egypt, which later made them known around the world by the vernacular term Gypsies, deriving from the word Egyptian.

== History ==
Though there was some discrimination against the Dom people in Egypt, historically, Domari in Egypt have intermixed with Egyptians and participate in local musical entertainment at weddings, circumcisions, and other celebrations, sing Egyptian traditional songs, and dance in return for money. The Dom people in Egypt, or Roma Egyptians, include subgroups, such as Nawar and Ghagar or Ghaggar (غجر).

The Dom in Egypt are Sunni Muslims, and apart from Egyptian Arabic, they also speak their own Domari language.

== Ottoman sources ==
In Evliya Çelebi's Seyahatnâme of 1668, he explained that the Gypsies from Komotini (Gümülcine) "swear by their heads" their ancestors came from Egypt. Moreover, the sedentary Gypsy groups from the Serres region in Greece believe their ancestors were once taken from Egypt Eyalet by the Ottomans to Rumelia after 1517 to work on the tobacco plantations of Turkish feudals there. Muslim Roma settled in Baranya and the City Pécs at the Ottoman Hungary. After the Siege of Pécs, Muslim Roma and some other Muslims converted to the Catholic faith in the years 1686–1713. The Ghagar a subgroup of the Doms in Egypt, tell that some of them went to Hungary.

== See also ==
- Doms in Iraq
- Doms in Israel
- Doms in Jordan
- Doms in Lebanon
- Doms in Libya
- Doms in Palestine
- Doms in Sudan
- Doms in Syria
- Doms in Tunisia
- Zott
