= Doms in Libya =

Dom people in Libya
Total population
- >10,000

Languages
- Domari, Libyan Arabic, Berber

Religion
- Islam

Related ethnic groups
- Dom people, Nawar people, Kawliya

Doms in Libya speak the Domari language. They immigrated to the territory of the present day Libya from South Asia, particularly from India, in Byzantine times. (Dom or Nawar) people self-segregated themselves for centuries from the dominant culture of Libya. Historically, Gypsies in Libya have provided musical entertainment as weddings and other celebrations. The Dom people in Libya include subgroups like Nawar, Halebi and Ghagar.

== See also ==
- Doms in Egypt
- Doms in Iraq
- Doms in Israel
- Doms in Jordan
- Doms in Lebanon
- Doms in Palestine
- Doms in Sudan
- Doms in Syria
- Doms in Tunisia
- Zott
