= Bab Hutta =

Neigborhod in old city of Jerusalem

Coordinates: 31°46′55″N 35°14′07″E

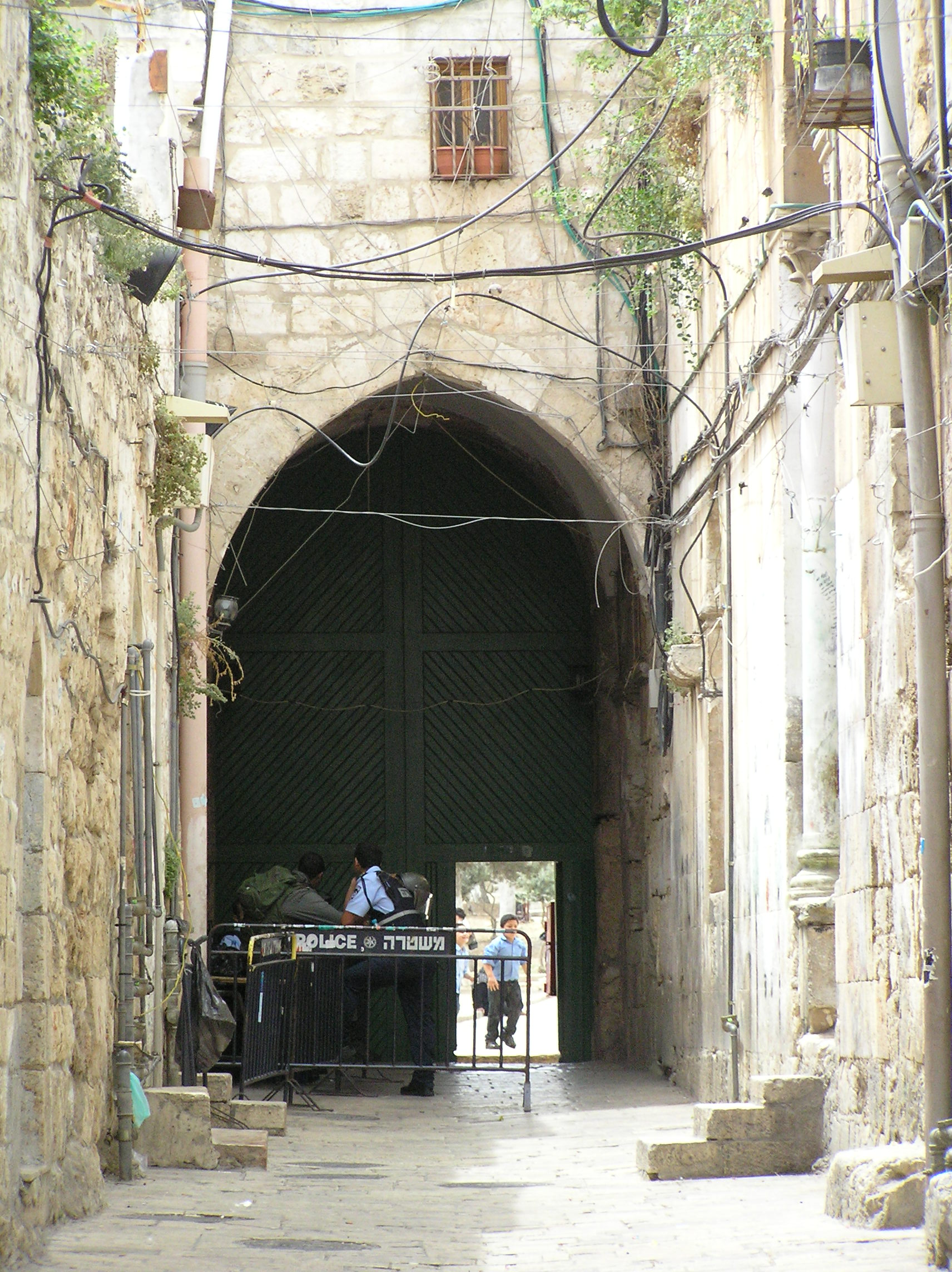
Bāb Ḥuṭṭa Street and the Remission (Forgiveness) Gate

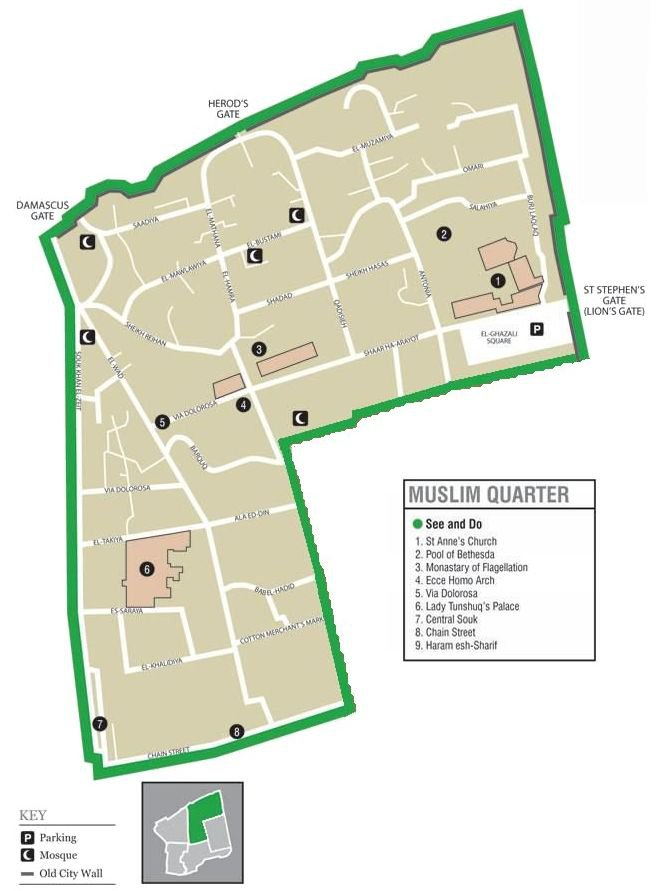
Map of the Muslim Quarter

Bāb Ḥuṭṭa (Arabic: باب حطة or باب الحطه Bāb (al-)Huṭṭa, Bāb (al-)Hiṭṭa) is a neighborhood in the Muslim Quarter of the Old City of Jerusalem to the north of Al-Aqsa Compound. The name literally means "Forgiveness (or Remission or Pardon) Gate", referring to the Remission Gate of the Haram compound, connected by Bāb Ḥuṭṭa Street.

As one of the northern gates, it is opposite to Abwab Mihrab Mariam and between Madrasah al-Karimiyah and Turbah al-Awhadiyah. It is located on the Northern Wall near the eastern corner. According to the study of Al-Ratrout (2002), the gate's name has changed throughout history. It is believed that this change was due to restorations over the years and Le Strange named this door as the ancient Bab al-Asbat. Today, Bab al-Hitta is one of the three gates that are open for morning, evening, and night prayers.

== History ==
In the late 15th century, Mujir ad-Din described it as one of the largest quarters in Jerusalem. A census taken by the Ottoman authority registered only Muslims in the quarter. At the beginning of the 20th century, the quarter had boundaries defined as follows:

- North and east - the city walls between St Stephen's Gate and Herod's Gate. The northeast corner is the Stork Tower (Burj al-Laqlaq).
- South - the north side of the Temple Mount.
- West - Zawiyat el-Hunud Street, 'Aqabet er-Rahibat, Bab el-Ghawanima Street.

In the 19th century, Jews were an increasing percentage of Jerusalem's population, and began to spread out of the Jewish Quarter into the Muslim Quarter. Jewish families settled in Bab al-Hutta by 1837.

== Demographics ==
The neighborhood is considered one of the poorest areas in the Old City. It is home to the Dom community of the Old City, known in Arabic as al-Nawar, led by mukhtar Abed-Alhakim Mohammed Deeb Salim.

== Architecture ==
“Significantly, the surviving gateway has the single opening of a semicircular arch with distinctive 45 degree chamfer and segmental inner arch observed at many gates of the enclave, especially Bab al-Hashmi. Evidence that there is a vertical joint in the masonry of the wall at 1.20 metres west of this gate as well as the historical description of the gate by Khusru (Khusru, 1983, p59) suggests that Bab al-Asbat was built with at least two openings. But it has been partially blocked at the end of the 13th century AD and left as a single opening (Burgoyne, 1992, p112)”

== Archeology ==
The construction date of the door is unknown, however, it was renovated during the Ayyubids and Ottomans’ reign. According to the recordings found, the gate was repaired two times. It was done during the time of the Ayyubids in Rajab 617 A.H. and later in 989 A.H.

== Significance ==
Some scholars believe that the phrase "Hitta" in verses 58 and 161 of Surah al-Baqarah and al-A’raf respectively refers to the Bab al-Hitta.
