= Abdo Mousa =

Jordanian musical artist (1927–1977)

Abdo Mousa عبده موسى
- Born: 1927; Irbid
- Died: 1977 (aged 49–50)
- Genres: Arabic music, Bedouin music
- Instrument: Rebab
- Years active: 1960s-1970s

Abdo Mousa (Arabic: عبده موسى; 1927 – 1977) was a Jordanian singer, composer, and rebab player, active during the 1960s and 1970s. He was a member of the Bani Murra, a Dom community in Jordan known for its musical traditions. Musa is regarded one of the prominent rebab players for his contributions to Bedouin folklore music and the popularization of rebab in Jordanian music.

== Biography ==
Musa was born in Irbid, Jordan in 1927. Orphaned and illiterate from a young age, Mousa was introduced to Jordan TV in 1958 by the then-Jordanian prime minister Hazza' Majali after hearing him play the rebab. He performed at various venues, including King Hussein's palace. The then-prime minister Wasfi Tal appointed a tutor to teach Mousa reading and writing.

Mousa composed music for several prominent Arab singers, including Samira Tewfik, Salwa al-Aas, and Suad Tawfik among others.

He also participated in various festival outside Jordan such as Syria, Tunisia, Bahrain, Lebanon, Turkey, London and Romania.

He was awarded Hussein Medal for Excellence, the Best Singer, and Best Instrumentalist in 1971 at Tunis festival.
