= Doms in Tunisia =

Total population
- 20,000

Languages
- Domari, Tunisian Arabic, Berber

Religion
- Islam

Related ethnic groups
- Dom people, Nawar people, Kawliya

Doms in Tunisia speak the Domari language. They immigrated to the territory of present-day Tunisia from South Asia, particularly from India, in Byzantine times. Doms self-segregated themselves for centuries from the dominant culture of Tunisia, who view the Doms as dishonorable though clever. Historically, Doms in Tunisia have provided musical entertainment at weddings and other celebrations. The Doms in Tunisia include subgroups such as Nawar, Halebi and Ghagar.

== See also ==
- Doms in Egypt
- Doms in Iraq
- Doms in Israel
- Doms in Jordan
- Doms in Lebanon
- Doms in Libya
- Doms in Palestine
- Doms in Sudan
- Doms in Syria
- Zott
