= Doms in Lebanon =

الغجر في لبنان (Arabic)

Total population
- 8,000

Regions with significant populations
- Beirut, Byblos, Tripoli and the Bekaa Valley

Languages
- Domari, Arabic

Religion
- Islam

There is a Dom community in Lebanon.

The Doms in Lebanon suffer from poverty and social marginalisation.

The estimated population of Dom in Beirut and South Lebanon is 3,112.

Similar to the Roma in Europe, historians assert that the Dom in Lebanon are the descendants of itinerant skilled musicians who migrated westward from India many centuries ago.

== Notable people ==
- Bilal

== See also ==
- Doms in Egypt
- Doms in Iraq
- Doms in Israel
- Doms in Jordan
- Doms in Libya
- Doms in Palestine
- Doms in Sudan
- Doms in Syria
- Doms in Tunisia
- Zott
