= Doms in Jordan =

Total population
- ≈ 70,000

Regions with significant populations
- Amman

Languages
- Domari, Arabic

Religion
- Islam

There is a Dom community (known as **Bani Murra**, Arabic: بني مرة) in Jordan. While Doms played a notable role in society at the time of Jordan's founding, some of its members now live in refugee camps with poor sanitary conditions.

In May 2015, the community formed the Bani Murra Association and initiated an outreach campaign with the slogan "I am Bani Murra, I am Jordanian," aiming to combat stereotypes and promote better rights for their members. A key demand of the Bani Murra Association is a guaranteed Parliament seat in Jordan's House of Representatives for Doms. The organization was founded by community leader Fathi Mousa, son of famous musician Abdo Mousa, a favorite of King Hussein who had entertained many dignitaries at the palace.

Romani people were a favorite theme by Mustafa Wahbi Al-Tal.

== See also ==
- Doms in Egypt
- Doms in Iraq
- Doms in Israel
- Doms in Lebanon
- Doms in Libya
- Doms in Palestine
- Doms in Sudan
- Doms in Syria
- Doms in Tunisia
- Zott
