= Doms in Israel =

Ethnic group in Israel

צוענים ישראליים

Total population
- 9,600

Regions with significant populations
- Jerusalem

Languages
- Domari, Hebrew, Arabic

Religion
- Islam

There is a Dom community in Israel and Palestine. It is estimated that about 5,000 Dom live in Israel, the West Bank and Gaza. Invisible to most Jerusalemites, between 1,200 and 3,000 of Dom reside inside the Lions’ Gate, in and around Burj Laklak Street. The Dom population in Israel have dwindled over the years because many fled to Jordan during Israel's wars, particularly the Six-Day War in 1967. Israeli Doms are concentrated in East Jerusalem. They are regarded by Israeli authorities as an integral part of the Arab population of East Jerusalem and the West Bank.

== Historical evidence about Doms in Israel ==
In the mid-18th century, German pilgrims told of encounters with Gypsies: German traveler Stephan Schulz met Gypsies near Acre, and Ulrich Jasper Zatzen met groups of Gypsies near Bethlehem, near Carmel on Mount Hebron and near the city of Nablus. In the 1840s, the German Krieger met gypsies in the Bethlehem area. In those years, the British John Wilson met Gypsies in the Majdal (Migdal) area west of the Sea of Galilee. The poet Ludwig August Frankl visited Ottoman Palestine in 1856 and met a group of gypsies near the Nablus Gate in Jerusalem. In 1855, the British Mary Rogers met Gypsies near the village of Arabeh in the Nablus region. Sep Wilson published in 1870, an article about gypsies they met near Jericho. In 1890, the archaeologist Flinders Petrie met a group of gypsies in an open field near the city of Jaffa. In 1909, an article was written in the "Haherut" newspaper, which told about the arrest of gypsies who were engaged in a theft in Jaffa. Robert McAllister published in 1914 a book about the language of the Gypsies. The book also included a hundred stories that dealt with their lives.

=== Zhutane Roma ===
A small group of people referred to as the Zhutane Roma emerged in Sofia, Bulgaria, during World War II. They were the mixed descendants of poor Jewish women who married Romani men. This group of Bulgarian Romani Jews lived in the neighborhood of Faculteta on Sredna Gora Street. There were over 100 Romani-Jewish families in Sofia. Following the Holocaust, most left for Israel, but several families stayed in Bulgaria.

== See also ==
- Jewish–Romani relations
- Doms in Egypt
- Doms in Iraq
- Doms in Jordan
- Doms in Lebanon
- Doms in Libya
- Doms in Palestine
- Doms in Sudan
- Doms in Syria
- Doms in Tunisia
- Zott
