= Adurgari =

Secret language of Afghanistan

- Created by: Shaikh Mohammadi
- Setting and usage: trade
- Purpose: secret cant
- Sources: local varieties of Persian?

Language codes
- ISO 639-3: None (mis)
- Glottolog: adur1234

Ādurgari is a secret language of the nomadic Shaikh Mohammadi group of peddlers of east Afghanistan, used especially in the presence of outsiders. It is taught to children starting at the age of six or seven as they would be speaking Persian until then; all adults speak it in addition to their native Dari. The name is apparently derived from a word referring to their activity of peddling (ādur), and it has tentatively been suggested this might indicate a possible connection with the Kharduri people of Uzbekistan.

The following five words are attested in the language: čamlai 'bread', danab 'girl, woman', duka 'house', lām 'meat', and rašuk 'man'.
