= Aparna Rao =

German anthropologist

- Born: 3 February 1950; New Delhi, India
- Died: 28 June 2005 (aged 55)
- Citizenship: Germany
- Spouse: Michael Casimir
- Awards: Choice

Academic background
- Education: University of Strasbourg (M.A.); Paris-Sorbonne University (Ph.D.)
- Thesis: Les Sinté du Pays Rhénan. Essai d'une Monographie d'un Sous–groupe Tsigane (M.A.); Les Ghorbat d'Afghanistan. Aspects Économiques d'un Groupe Itinerant 'Jat' (Note: The Ghorbat of Afghanistan. Economic Aspects of an Itinerant Group 'Jat') (Ph.D.)
- Doctoral advisor: Xavier de Planhol

Academic work
- Discipline: Anthropology
- Sub-discipline: Ethnography; Ethnology
- Institutions: Former co-chairperson, Commission on Nomadic Peoples of the International Union of Ethnological and Anthropological Sciences

Aparna Rao (3 February 1950 – 28 June 2005) was a German anthropologist who performed studies on social groups in Afghanistan, France, and some regions of India. Her doctorate studies focused on anthropogeography, ethnology, and Islamic studies. Rao taught anthropology at the University of Cologne, serving for a brief time as chair of the Department of Ethnology at the South Asia Institute of Heidelberg University, Germany.

Rao's research focused on peripatetic, agrarian populations in Afghanistan, France, Jammu, Kashmir, and western Rajasthan. Rao researched the impact of the conflict in Kashmir on the environment and lives of people. Her 1982 work, Les Ġhorbat d'Afghanistan. Aspects Économiques d'un Groupe Itinérant 'Jat', researched the ethnic makeup and local economy of Afghanistan. Her book Autonomy: Life Cycle, Gender, and Status among Himalayan Pastoralists received the 1999 Choice award.

== Early life and education ==
Aparna Rao was born in New Delhi, India, to Oxford–educated parents who were political activists. In 1980, she married Michael J. Casimir (b. 1942 in Berlin), an ethnologist who retired in 2020 as professor emeritus from the Institute of Social and Cultural Anthropology of the University of Cologne, Germany.

Rao studied French literature, linguistics, cultural anthropology, physical anthropology, sociology, and ethnology at the University of Strasbourg. She received her M.A. in anthropology from the University of Strasbourg in 1974, and later in 1980, completed her Ph.D. in ethnology from the Paris-Sorbonne University. Rao studied anthropogeography, ethnology, and Islamic studies during her doctorate studies. She spoke multiple languages including Bengali, English, French, German, Hindi, Persian, Romanes, and Urdu.

== Academic career ==
Rao taught anthropology as an associate professor at the University of Cologne. She became a member of the Société Asiatique in 1981. From 1993 to 1995, she was chair of the Department of Ethnology at the South Asia Institute of Heidelberg University, Germany. From 1995 to 1998, she served as the co-chairperson of the Commission on Nomadic Peoples of the International Union of Ethnological and Anthropological Sciences, along with Michael Casimir. She had been on the board of directors of the Association of Gypsy Lore Studies. She was editor-in-chief of the Nomadic Peoples (Note: Journal of the Commission of International Union of Anthropological and Ethnological Sciences on the Nomadic Peoples) journal.

Between 1995 and 1997, she was invited as a visiting scholar by the Institute of Development Studies at Jaipur, and between 2003 and 2004, by the Centre for the Study of Developing Societies at Delhi. Before her death in June 2005, she was scheduled to be the research director at the Ecole des Hautes Etudes in Paris.

== Research ==
Rao performed field studies on the farming, pastoral, and peripatetic peoples. She researched the economy, ethnicity, gender relations, and social organization of pastoralist and peripatetic peoples in Afghanistan, France, and Kashmir. She studied cognition, economy, environment, and social change in the midst of social groups in Rajasthan and Kashmir. According to Jadwiga Pstrusińska, utilizing her native-level knowledge of an Indian language, she discovered previously unobserved phenomena on the languages of Afghanistan during her ethnological studies on the country's peripatetic populace in the 1980s. In her research in Afghanistan, Rao identified the Jalali, Pikraj, Shadibaz and Vangawala peoples as four clans of "industrial nomads" who speak a north Indian dialect and have characteristics of gypsies. In 2004, the four clans' total estimated population in Afghanistan was 7,000. Between 1980 and 1992, she performed ethnographic research on the agency and autonomy within the Bakarwals whose traditions have incorporated elements from those of the Pashtuns and Punjabis.

Rao's research works included the impact of the conflict in Kashmir on the environment and lives of people, and from 1991 to 1994, she did research on the ethnic, religious, and political conflicts in Jammu and Kashmir. Rena C. Gropper of Hunter College noted that Rao was one of the few anthropologists who had carried out research studies in the midst of groups who draw their basic livelihood from other cultural groups. The term "peripatetic peoples", that was coined by her, has become a part of academic terminology. She defined the peripatetic peoples as "the endogamous groups who employ regular spatial mobility as an economic strategy".

== Written work ==
In Les Ġhorbat d'Afghanistan. Aspects Économiques d'un Groupe Itinérant 'Jat,' Rao discussed the livelihood of the Jat people of Afghanistan, with a focus on the Ghorbat people. Asta Olesen suggested that in the book, Rao had filled "an almost complete gap in the knowledge of the ethnic puzzle of Afghanistan". According to University of North Carolina's Jon W. Anderson, the book made accessible the 19 months of fieldwork presented in it.

Gropper suggested that her book The Other Nomads: Peripatetic Minorities in Cross–Cultural Perspective (1987) lacked structure and relevancy to future work.

While reviewing Culture, Creation, and Procreation: Concepts of Kinship in South Asian Practice, a book that was co–authored by Rao in 2000, Ann Grodzins Gold of Syracuse University pointed out that a large proportion of its content had been drawn from anthropological field studies concluded or initiated in the 1970s and early 1980s and that the book lacked "new ethnography". Gold also said that a one-sided presentation of cultural essentialism didn't give much credence to a postcolonial interpretation. She noted that the authors substantially covered the "geographic and ethnographic contexts" of South Asia.

Rao's coauthored book Customary Strangers: New Perspectives on Peripatetic Peoples in the Middle East, Africa, and Asia, published in 2004, was a set of mainly ethnographic essays surrounding the role of interactions between settled and displaced peoples. In one of the essays, she analyzed research conducted on some Afghan nomadic people in 1975–1978, their self-perception, and how they were perceived by the sedentary populace of Afghanistan. In the book, Rao built off previous work conducted by Georg Simmel. University of Pittsburgh's Robert M. Hayden reviewed the book, believing that the book might in the future serve as a benchmark study of displaced peoples. Hayden also believed that Rao's explanation for why the peripatetic lifestyle is successful was a good summary of the scholarly consensus surrounding the peripatetic lifestyle.

Rao's co-authored and co-edited book Nomadism in South Asia is a series of essays on nomadism in South Asia. Vinay Kumar Srivastava said that the ethnographic investigations done on nomadism by the authors were extensive. He further added that "...this is the first volume of its kind that brings together different writings, from different cultural contexts on nomads". According to Denison University's Bahram Tavakolian, the book clarified the understanding of how "environment, structure, and agency" interacted in nomadic cultures.

Rao was given the Choice award in 1999, for her book Autonomy: Life Cycle, Gender, and Status among Himalayan Pastoralists.

== Death ==
Rao died of cancer on 28 June 2005.

== Works ==
=== Books authored ===
- Rao, Aparna (1998). Autonomy: Life Cycle, Gender, and Status among Himalayan Pastoralists. New York: Berghahn Books. LCCN 97015842.
- Rao, Aparna (1988). Entstehung und Entwicklung Ethnischer Identität bei einer Islamischen Minderheit in Südasien: Bemerkungen zur Geschichte der Bakkarwal im Westlichen Himalaya [Origin and Development of Ethnic Identity among an Islamic Minority in South Asia: Comments on the History of the Bakkarwal in the Western Himalayas]. Berlin: Das Arabische Buch. LCCN 88204809.
- Rao, Aparna (1982) [Composed 1980]. Les Ġhorbat d'Afghanistan. Aspects Économiques d'un Groupe Itinérant 'Jat' [The Ghorbat of Afghanistan. Economic Aspects of an Itinerant Group 'Jat']. Paris: A.D.P.F. LCCN 83174197.
- Rao, Aparna (1979). Note Préliminaire sur les Jat d'Afghanistan /cAparna Rao [Preliminary Note on the Jat of Afghanistan] (in French) (Reprinted from: Studia Iranica, t.8, fasc. 1 ed.). Association pour l'avancement des Études Iraniennes. OCLC 1039700457.

=== Books edited ===
- Rao, Aparna; Bollig, Michael; Böck, Monika, eds. (2007). The Practice of War: Production, Reproduction and Communication of Armed Violence. New York; Oxford: Berghahn Books. LCCN 2008299236.
- Rao, Aparna; Casimir, Michael J., eds. (2003). Nomadism in South Asia. Oxford in India Readings in Sociology and Social Anthropology. New Delhi: Oxford University Press. LCCN 2003321544.
- Rao, Aparna; Berland, Joseph C., eds. (2004). Customary Strangers: New Perspectives on Peripatetic Peoples in the Middle East, Africa, and Asia. Westport, Connecticut: Praeger. LCCN 2003060424.
- Rao, Aparna; Böck, Monika, eds. (2000). Culture, Creation, and Procreation: Concepts of Kinship in South Asian Practice. New York: Berghahn Books. LCCN 00060885.
- Rao, Aparna; Casimir, Michael J., eds. (1992) [Composed 1987]. Mobility and Territoriality: Social and Spatial Boundaries Among Foragers, Fishers, Pastoralists, and Peripatetics (Conference papers and proceedings: Outcome of a conference held under the auspices of the Deutsche Gesellschaft für Völkerkunde, in Cologne in October 1987). New York: Berg. LCCN 91023207.
- Rao, Aparna; Orywal, Erwin; Bollig, Michael, eds. (1996). Krieg und Kampf: die Gewalt in Unseren Köpfen [War and Struggle: The Violence in Our Heads] (in German). Berlin: D. Reimer. OCLC 36406067.
- Rao, Aparna, ed. (1987). The Other Nomads: Peripatetic Minorities in Cross–Cultural Perspective. Kölner Ethnologische Mitteilungen, Volume 8. Köln: Böhlau Verlag. LCCN 87153302.

=== Selected papers ===
- Rao, Aparna (1987). "The Concept of Peripatetics: An Introduction". In Rao, Aparna (ed.). The Other Nomads: Peripatetic Minorities in Cross–Cultural Perspective. Kölner Ethnologische Mitteilungen, Volume 8. Köln: Böhlau Verlag. LCCN 87153302.
- Rao, Aparna; Casimir, Michael J. (August 1985). "Vertical Control in the Western Himalaya: Some Notes on the Pastoral Ecology of the Nomadic Bakrwal of Jammu and Kashmir". Mountain Research and Development. 5 (3). International Mountain Society: 221–232. doi:10.2307/3673355. JSTOR 3673355.(registration required)
- Rao, Aparna; Casimir, Michael J. (September 1995). "Prestige, Possessions, and Progeny: Cultural Goals and Reproductive Success Among the Bakkarwal". Human Nature. 6 (3). Springer: 241–272. doi:10.1007/BF02734141. PMID 24203092. S2CID 3119534.
- Rao, Aparna; Zhang, Yanchun; Thelen, Nina (September 2009). "Social Protection in Fiscal Stimulus Packages: Some Evidence" (PDF). New York: United Nations Development Programme. Archived from the original (PDF) on 17 September 2021.
- Rao, Aparna (July–September 1985). "Des Nomades Méconnus: Pour une Typologie des Communautés Péripatétiques". L'Homme (in French). 25 (95). Paris: École des Hautes Études en Sciences Sociales: 97–120. doi:10.3406/hom.1985.368592. JSTOR 25132145.(registration required)
- Rao, Aparna; Casimir, Michael J. (March 1998). "Sustainable Herd Management and the Tragedy of No Man's Land: An Analysis of West Himalayan Pastures Using Remote Sensing Techniques". Human Ecology. 26 (1). Springer: 113–134. Bibcode:1998HumEc..26..113C. doi:10.1023/A:1018701001793. S2CID 151112196.
