= Garachi =

Subgroup of Romani people in Azerbaijan

Total population
- 2,000

Regions with significant populations
- Azerbaijan, Turkey

Languages
- Garachi, Azerbaijani, Tat, Domari, Turkish, Kurdish.

Religion
- Islam

Related ethnic groups
- Ghorbati, Dom people

The Garachi (Azerbaijani: Qaraçı; Kurdish: Qereçî) or the Karachi (Turkish: Karaçi) are a group of the Dom people living in Azerbaijan and Turkey. Little research has been done on the Garachi, and most of what is known about them is based on the works of the 19th-century Russian scholars Kerope Patkanov and Jean-Marie Chopin.

The term Garachi is sometimes used to describe the Domari-speaking people of northern Iran. The confusion is explained by the fact that both groups live in the regions populated mostly by Azeri-speakers who apply the word Garachi to medieval collective migrants from the Indian Subcontinent.

== Origins and history ==
Even though the Garachi of Azerbaijan and Turkey call themselves Dom (the name Garachi was given to them by the local population and derives from the Azeri word qara - "black" and the suffix -çı denoting the stem-word's function/occupation), they do not seem to share same origins with the Dom people. According to Jean-Marie Chopin, the Azerbaijani Garachi descend from the medieval Romani nomads of Central Asia. In 1944, Vasily Yan suggested that the Garachi of Azerbaijan and the Dom of Iran (sometimes referred to as the Garachi) differ in terms of their origins.

In 1887, Kerope Patkanov stated that the Garachi of the South Caucasus (then part of the Russian Empire) numbered 2,399 people living mostly in the Goychay uyezd (present-day Goychay, Ujar, Agsu, and Ismayilli districts of Azerbaijan) and Nakhchivan. The largest Garachi settlement was named after them and is situated around 4 km southeast of Khacmaz town in Khachmaz region.

Their main occupation was the production of household items such as baskets, sieves and chewing gum made by men and sold by women in the neighbouring towns. Among other sources of income Patkanov lists fortune-telling and cattle larceny. Nomadic Garachi groups used to train animals and make street song-and-dance performances. This practice was described in the famous 1913 story Garaja giz by the Azeri writer Suleyman Sani Akhundov.

== Language ==
Garachi
- Karachi
- Native to: Azerbaijan
- Language family: Indo-European: Indo-Iranian; Indo-Aryan; Western Indo Aryan; Domari; Garachi

Language codes
- ISO 639-3: –
- Glottolog: kara1460

Patkanov's analysis of the language of the Garachi (based on 101 common phrases) indicated that despite being Indo-Aryan, it is not mutually intelligible with any of the Romani or Domari dialects of the Balkans, Russia, or the Middle East. In addition to it, the Garachi observed by Patkanov spoke Azeri and sometimes Tat as a second and third language respectively.

Here are four phrases in Garachi and Romani languages with translation.

Garachi	Romani	English translation
Salamalikim, baro, kefoj kybra?; Kasta mashgul astoj?; Ma dom astum!; Kiti dom astak?	Selamo, baro, sökerdan?; So keresa?; Me sem rom!; Kicik romen san?	Hello, brother, how are you?; What are you doing?; I am Gipsy (Dom, Rom)!; How many Gypsies are there?

== Present-day ==
Most Garachis nowadays are settled and live in communities in Yevlakh, Agdash, Gakh, Khachmaz and Baku suburbs numbering altogether around 2,000 people. Small communities in Shusha and Jabrayil were driven out by the Armenian forces during the First Nagorno-Karabakh War. Presently the Garachi are undergoing cultural and linguistic assimilation by Azeris. Modern Garachi couples tend to have 2 to 3 children as opposed to 5 and above, as was often the case throughout their history.
