= Inku language =

Indo-Aryan language of Afghanistan

Inku
- Native to: Afghanistan
- Ethnicity: Jalali, Pikraj, Shadibaz, Vangawala
- Language family: Indo-European: Indo-Iranian; Indo-Aryan; Northwestern; Punjabi; Lahnda; Inku

Language codes
- ISO 639-3: jat
- Glottolog: jaka1245

Inku is an Indo-Aryan language spoken, at least historically, throughout Afghanistan by four of the country's itinerant communities: the Jalali, the Pikraj, the Shadibaz and the Vangawala. Itinerant communities in Afghanistan, whether Inku-speaking or not, are locally known as "Jats" (not to be confused with the Jats of India and Pakistan), a term which is not a self-designation of the groups but rather a collective, often pejorative name given by outsiders. The reference work Ethnologue has an entry for what could be this language, but under the name Jakati (with the corresponding ISO 639-3 code jat), but that entry is at least partly erroneous.

Each of the four groups speaks a variety with slight differences compared to the others. According to their local tradition, their ancestors migrated in the 19th century from the Dera Ismail Khan and Dera Ghazi Khan regions of present-day Pakistan. Such an origin suggests that Inku may be related to the Saraiki language spoken there, though nothing is conclusively known.

The total population of the four Inku-speaking groups was estimated to be 7,000 as of the end of the 1970s. There is no reliable information about their present state, though it is unlikely that many have survived the subsequent upheavals in the country, and according to the entry in Ethnologue for "Jakati", which however may not necessarily refer to this language, the last speakers "probably survived into the 1990s".

Linguistic materials about the varieties spoken by the Shadibaz, Vangawala and Pikraj were collected by Aparna Rao in the 1970s, but they have not been published or analysed yet.

== Example text ==
The following is an extract of a text narrated in 1978 by a man of the Chenarkhel subgroup of the Vangawala:

asona dyana.
listen(?) attention

asāñ ta bewatan te bezamīñ bejedad eñ.
we then countryless and landless propertyless are

as sāṛe ḍāḍe is vatan kono āeñ Balučistān koloñ.
our {} ancestors this country to came Baluchistan from

as sāṛe ḍāḍe Balučistān koloñ āeñ.
our {} ancestors Baluchistan from came

te is vatan vič asāñ taqriban sō {ḍiḍ sō} varā thi gaiñ.
and this country in we about 100 150 years has/have become

sō {ḍiḍ sō} warā thi gayā asā bejedād bezamīn vadiyeñ.
100 150 years has/have become we propertyless landless {are in trouble}

== Bibliography ==
- Eberhard, David M.; Simons, Gary F.; Fennig, Charles D., eds. (2019). "Jakati". Ethnologue: Languages of the World (22nd ed.). SIL International.
- Hanifi, M. Jamil (2012). "Jāt". Encyclopædia Iranica.
- Hammarström, Harald; Forkel, Robert; Haspelmath, Martin; Bank, Sebastian, eds. (2022). "Inku". Glottolog (4.6 ed.). Leipzig: Max Planck Institute for Evolutionary Anthropology.
- Kieffer, Charles (1983). "Afghanistan: V. Languages". Encyclopædia Iranica. Vol. I. pp. 501–516.
- Rao, Aparna (1986). "Peripatetic Minorities in Afghanistan: Image and Identity". In Orywal, Erwin (ed.). Die ethnischen Gruppen Afghanistans. Wiesbaden: L. Reichert. pp. 254–83. ISBN 3-88226-360-1.
- Rao, Aparna (1995). "Marginality and language use: the example of peripatetics in Afghanistan". Journal of the Gypsy Lore Society. 5 (2): 69–95.
