= Doms in Iraq =

Total population
- 50,000–200,000

Regions with significant populations
- Basra, Baghdad and Nasiriyah

Languages
- Domari and Gilit Mesopotamian Arabic

Religion
- Islam (Shia and Sunni)

Related ethnic groups
- Other Doms

The Kawliya or Qawliya (Arabic: كاولية or كاولي), also known as Zott, is a community in Iraq of Indian origin, estimated to number over 60,000 people. Today, they speak mostly Arabic, while their ethnolect is a mixture of Persian, Kurdish and Turkish, which is only spoken by the older generations. The largest tribes are the Bu-Baroud, Bu-Swailem, Bu-Helio, Bu-Dakhil, Bu-Akkar, Bu-Murad, Bu-Thanio, Bu-Shati, Al-Farahedah, Al-Mtairat, Bu-Khuzam, Bu-Abd, Bu-Nasif, Bu-Delli and Al-Nawar. Their main occupation is entertainment, and also small trades.

The Kawliya migrated from India approximately 1,000 years ago.

The term Kawali comes from Kabuli, meaning a resident of Kabul, Afghanistan.

Kawliya is also the name of a former village in the Al-Qādisiyyah Governorate near Al Diwaniyah, located about 100 miles southeast of Baghdad, where they live.

Iraqi Doms predominantly reside in remote villages in southern Iraq, particularly in Al-Qadissiya governorate, in addition to the surrounding areas of Baghdad, Basra, and Mosul. Despite the fact that most Doms people in Iraq belong to the Shi’a or Sunni Muslim faith, they face persecution from Islamist militias due to their customary roles as performers. In the 1970s, the Ba'ath government led by Saddam Hussein offered them citizenship and nationality. During this period, they worked as dancers, singers and artists, which was well known.

== See also ==
- Doms in Egypt
- Doms in Israel
- Doms in Jordan
- Doms in Lebanon
- Doms in Libya
- Doms in Palestine
- Doms in Sudan
- Doms in Syria
- Doms in Tunisia
- Ghorbati
- Nawar people
- Zott
