= Persian Kowli =

Persian and Domari-based slang spoken by Ghorbati people

Ghorbati, Persian-Gypsy, Lyuli Slang
- Native to: Iran, Afghanistan, Uzbekistan, Tajikistan, Pakistan
- Language family: argot
- Dialects: Afghan Ghorbat; Magati; Qorbati of Shiraz; Arabi/Arabcha or Lafzi Mugat (also Jogigi); Adurgari; Chistonegi

Language codes
- ISO 639-3: None (mis)
- Glottolog: pers1247

Persian Kowli, also known as Ghorbati (Qorbati), Magadi (Mogadi), Qazulagi and Jogigi, Lafzi Mugat or Arabi/Arabcha in Central Asia, refers to various argots, spoken by the Ghorbati and closely related peoples, often called “Persian Gypsies” or “Central Asian Gypsies”. There is no proof of any historical connection between any of these peripatetic groups and the Roma or Dom peoples, except for the fact that some use a few words that are apparently of Domari origin. These argots are related to Lotera’i, or Judeo-Persian.

The Ghorbati of Afghanistan is not identical to the various varieties from Iran, but they are closely related. The base is local Persian, with many words rendered incomprehensible by means of phonetical manipulation, as well as a large number of terms which are of Semitic (Aramaic and Hebrew, as well as Arabic) origin. This vocabulary originated from the Banu Sassan and Sufis, and is quite widespread throughout the Islamic world.

The name of Magati, another secret language, is cognate with “Mogadi/Magadi”, the alternate name for Ghorbati, and is also related to the ethnonym of the Mugat people, known as Lyuli in Central Asia and Jogi in Afghanistan. This language from Qaisar, near Faryab, Afghanistan, bears some similarities with Adurgari, the argot of the Sheikh Muhammadi community, as well as the Abdal (Teber) in Turkey, and Gurbetça in Cyprus.

== See also ==
- Zargari tribe

== Sources ==
- "GYPSY ii. Gypsy Dialects".
