= Jalali, Hormozgan =

Jalali جلالي
- Village
- Location within Iran
- Coordinates: 27°54′51″N 56°43′53″E
- Country: Iran
- Province: Hormozgan
- County: Hajjiabad
- Bakhsh: Ahmadi
- Rural District: Ahmadi

Population (2006)
  - Total: 171
- Time zone: UTC+3:30 (IRST)
  - Summer (DST): UTC+4:30 (IRDT)

Jalali (Persian: جلالي, also Romanized as Jalālī; also known as Jalali Ahmadi) is a village in Ahmadi Rural District, Ahmadi District, Hajjiabad County, Hormozgan Province, Iran. At the 2006 census, its population was 171, in 45 families.
