= Jalalieh, Razavi Khorasan =

Jalalieh جلاليه
- Village
- Location within Iran
- Coordinates: 36°16′26″N 59°43′07″E
- Country: Iran
- Province: Razavi Khorasan
- County: Mashhad
- Bakhsh: Central
- Rural District: Kenevist

Population (2006)
  - Total: 129
- Time zone: UTC+3:30 (IRST)
  - Summer (DST): UTC+4:30 (IRDT)

Jalalieh (Persian: جلاليه, also Romanized as Jalālīeh; also known as Jalālī) is a village in Kenevist Rural District, in the Central District of Mashhad County, Razavi Khorasan Province, Iran. At the 2006 census, its population was 129, in 26 families.
