= Jalali, Razavi Khorasan =

Jalali جلالي
- Village
- Location within Iran
- Coordinates: 36°33′02″N 59°19′26″E
- Country: Iran
- Province: Razavi Khorasan
- County: Mashhad
- Bakhsh: Central
- Rural District: Miyan Velayat

Population (2006)
  - Total: 551
- Time zone: UTC+3:30 (IRST)
  - Summer (DST): UTC+4:30 (IRDT)

Jalali (Persian: جلالي, also Romanized as Jalālī) is a village in Miyan Velayat Rural District, in the Central District of Mashhad County, Razavi Khorasan Province, Iran. At the 2006 census, its population was 551, in 124 families.
