= Lomavren language =

Nearly extinct mixed language spoken by the Lom people

Lomavren
- Bosa, Bosha
- Լոմավրեն
- Native to: Armenia, Turkey, Syria
- Native speakers: 50 in Armenia (2004)
- Language family: mixed Lom–Armenian
- Writing system: Armenian alphabet

Language codes
- ISO 639-3: rmi
- Glottolog: loma1235

Lomavren (Armenian: Լոմավրեն lomavren) is a nearly extinct mixed language spoken by the Lom people, that arose from language contact between a language related to Romani and Domari and the Armenian language. The language is also known as Bosa and Bosha.

== Linguistic features ==
It lacks grammatical gender and has seven grammatical cases; its grammar is closely related to that of the Karin dialect of Armenian, with the vocabulary being almost exclusively Indic.

Numerals in the Romani, Domari and Lomavren languages, with Sanskrit, Hindi, Odia, Bengali, Persian and Sinhala forms for comparison. Also Greek and Latin included.

Numbers	Sanskrit	Mitanni Aryan	Hindi	Odia	Bengali	Romani	Domari	Lomavren	Greek	Persian	Sinhala	Latin
1	éka	aika- (a-i-ka-)	ēk	ēkå	æk	ekh, jekh	yika	yak, yek	éna	yak, yek	eka	ūnus, ūna, ūnum
2	dvá		dō	dui	dui	duj	dī	lui	dýo	du, do	deka	duo, duae, duo
3	trí	tera-? (ti-e-ra-)	tīn	tini	tin	trin	tærən	tərin	tría	se	thuna/thri	trēs, tria
4	catvā́raḥ		cār	cāri	char	štar	štar	išdör	téssera	čahār	hathara/sathara	quattuor
5	páñca	pańća-? (pa-an-za-)	pā̃c	pāñcå	panch	pandž	pandž	pendž	pénte	pandž	paha	quīnque
6	ṣáṭ		chaḥ	chåå	chhoy	šov	šaš	šeš	éxi	šeš	haya/saya	sex
7	saptá	satta (ša-at-ta)	sāt	sātå	sāt	ifta	xaut	haft	eptá	haft	hata/satha	septem
8	aṣṭá		āṭh	āṭhå	āṭh	oxto	xaišt	hašt	októ	hašt	ata	octō
9	náva	nāva- (na-a-[w]a-)	nau	nåå	noy	inja	na	nu	ennéa	noh	nawaya	novem
10	dáśa		das	dåśå	dosh	deš	des	las	déka	dah	dahaya	decem
20	viṃśatí		bīs	kōṛiē	bish	biš	wīs	vist	eíkosi	bist	wissa	vīgintī
100	śatá		sau	śåhē	eksho	šel	saj	saj	ekató	sad	siiya/shathakaya	centum

== See also ==
- Kurbet language
- Para-Romani
