= Lom people =

Ethnic group in Transcaucasia

Lom Bosha
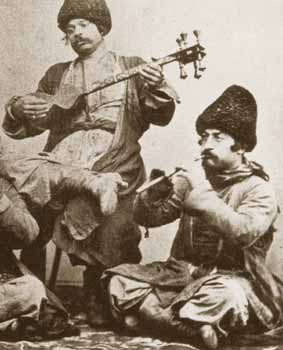
- Bosha gypsies, 19th century

Regions with significant populations
- Armenia, Turkey, Georgia

Languages
- Lomavren, Armenian, Georgian, Turkish

Religion
- Christianity (Armenian Apostolic), Islam (in Turkey)

Related ethnic groups
- Romani, Doms, Domba, Ghorbati; other Indo-Aryans

The Lom people (Turkish: Lomlar), also known by non-Loms as Bosha or Posha (Turkish: Poşa; Armenian: Բոշա; Georgian: ბოშა, romanized: bosha; Russian: Боша), are an ethnic group originating from the Indian subcontinent. Their Lomavren language is a mixed language, combining an Indo-Aryan substrate with Armenian.

== Number ==
Lom/Bosha in Soviet Transcaucasia
Year	Armenia	Georgia	Azerbaijan
1926	2	333	333
1939	7	727	400
1959	18	1,024	577
1970	12	1,224	843
1979	59	1,223	121
1989	48	1,744	145

It is difficult to determine the exact number of Bosha people, due to the dispersed and often mostly-assimilated nature of the group. Estimates suggest only a few thousand of the people can be found across Armenia and Georgia, while the Armenian Government's census reports only 50 living in the former.

== Distribution ==
Concentrations of Bosha can be found in Yerevan and Gyumri in Armenia. Some of the Bosha in Armenia have adopted the Armenian language and partially assimilated with the larger Armenian population.

In Georgia they live in such cities as Tbilisi, Kutaisi, Akhalkalaki and Akhaltsikhe. They are noted for such occupations as sievemakers.

In Turkey, the Loms or Poshas adopted Islam at the 19th century and assimilated into Turkish culture. They mostly live in Artvin, Rize, Ardahan and Kars and identify themselves as Meskhetian Turks, hiding their Lom origins, while taking Armenian words from their contact with the Hemshin.
