= Dalak, Iran =

Dalak دلك
- Village
- Location within Iran
- Coordinates: 35°22′31″N 47°31′54″E
- Country: Iran
- Province: Kurdistan
- County: Dehgolan
- Bakhsh: Central
- Rural District: Howmeh-ye Dehgolan

Population (2006)
  - Total: 88
- Time zone: UTC+3:30 (IRST)
  - Summer (DST): UTC+4:30 (IRDT)

Dalak (Persian: دلك, also Romanized as Delak; also known as Dahlek, Deh-e Lū, and Deh-i-Lu) is a village in Howmeh-ye Dehgolan Rural District, in the Central District of Dehgolan County, Kurdistan Province, Iran. At the 2006 census, its population was 88, in 18 families. The village is populated by Kurds.
