= Jalali (surname) =

Jalali is a Kashmiri surname. Notable people with the surname include:

- Ahmad Jalali, Iranian scholar and philosopher
- Ahmad Reza Jalali, imprisoned Swedish-Iranian doctor and researcher
- Ali Ahmad Jalali, former interior minister of Afghanistan
- Aria C Jalali!, solo indie musician
- Bahram Jalali, electrical engineer
- Bijan Jalali, Iranian modern poet
- Kazem Jalali, member of Iran's Majles
- Majid Jalali, Iranian football manager and former football player
- Mohammad Hossein Jalali, Iranian military personnel
- Muhammad Ali Jalali, former governor in Afghanistan
- Mohammad Ghazi al-Jalali, Syrian politician
- Shakeb Jalali, Pakistani Urdu poet
