= Dalak people =

Ethnic group found in western Afghanistan

The Dalak are an ethnic group found mainly in western Afghanistan. Technically, the word dalak is derived from the Arabic word dalaka which means to rub. Their preferred self-designation is now Salmani, as the word dalak is seen as offensive, and the community were traditionally associated with the profession of barbering.

== Origin ==
The principal function of the Dalak is cutting hair, circumcision, the performance of music at certain events such as marriages for their patrons and carrying out certain minor surgical operations. Little is known about the origin of the Dalak, but a possible connection with the Jot people cannot be ruled. Unlike the Jat, who are nomadic, the Dalak are essentially a settled urban community, with settlements in Herat, mainly in the neighbourhood of Kurt, and in Chisht as well as other towns of western Afghanistan. A claim is now being made that they are descended from Salman Al Farsi, a Sahabah of Mohammad, hence the new name Salmani meaning a descendant of Salman.

During the summer months, the Dalak leave their urban settlements and visit various villages, where they perform circumcision, entertain at weddings, cut hair and occasional perform agriculture labour. A patron client relationship exists with the local sedentary population. Historically, they were given in grain in return for their services, but increasingly they are now being paid cash.

Their patrons belong mainly to the Aimaq, Tajik and Uzbek communities, and their culture is not dissimilar to the other Dari speaking communities. However, there is virtually no intermarriage between the Dalak and neighbouring ethnic groups, and as a community they are strictly endogamous. The Dalak are Sunni Muslims, although they incorporate folk beliefs.

== See also ==
- Peripatetic groups of Afghanistan
- Hajjam
