= Siege of Pécs (1686) =

1686 battle in Pécs in present-day Hungary

- Part of Great Turkish War
Date	14–22 October 1686
Location	Pécs, Ottoman Hungary
Result	Holy Roman Empire victory

Belligerents
Holy Roman Empire	Ottoman Empire

Commanders and leaders
Louis William, Margrave of Baden-Baden	Sarı Süleyman Pasha

The siege of Pécs was fought from 14 to 22 October 1686, in the city of Pécs in southwestern Hungary, between the armies of the Ottoman Empire and of the Holy Roman Empire.

After the castle of Buda was wrested from Ottoman rule in 1686, the Austrian army advanced to capture Pécs which was defended by Sarı Süleyman Pasha. The Austrian advance guard broke into the city and pillaged it, the Ottomans saw that they could not hold the city, so they burnt it and withdrew into the castle. The army led by Louis of Baden occupied the city on 14 October, and destroyed the aqueduct leading to the castle. The Ottomans had no other choice but to surrender, which they did on 22 October. The siege devastated the previously prosperous region, and the area was depopulated by the peasants who fled from the Austrian soldiers.
