= Dom people =

Ethnic group with origins in the Indian subcontinent

Doms
دومري (Domari)
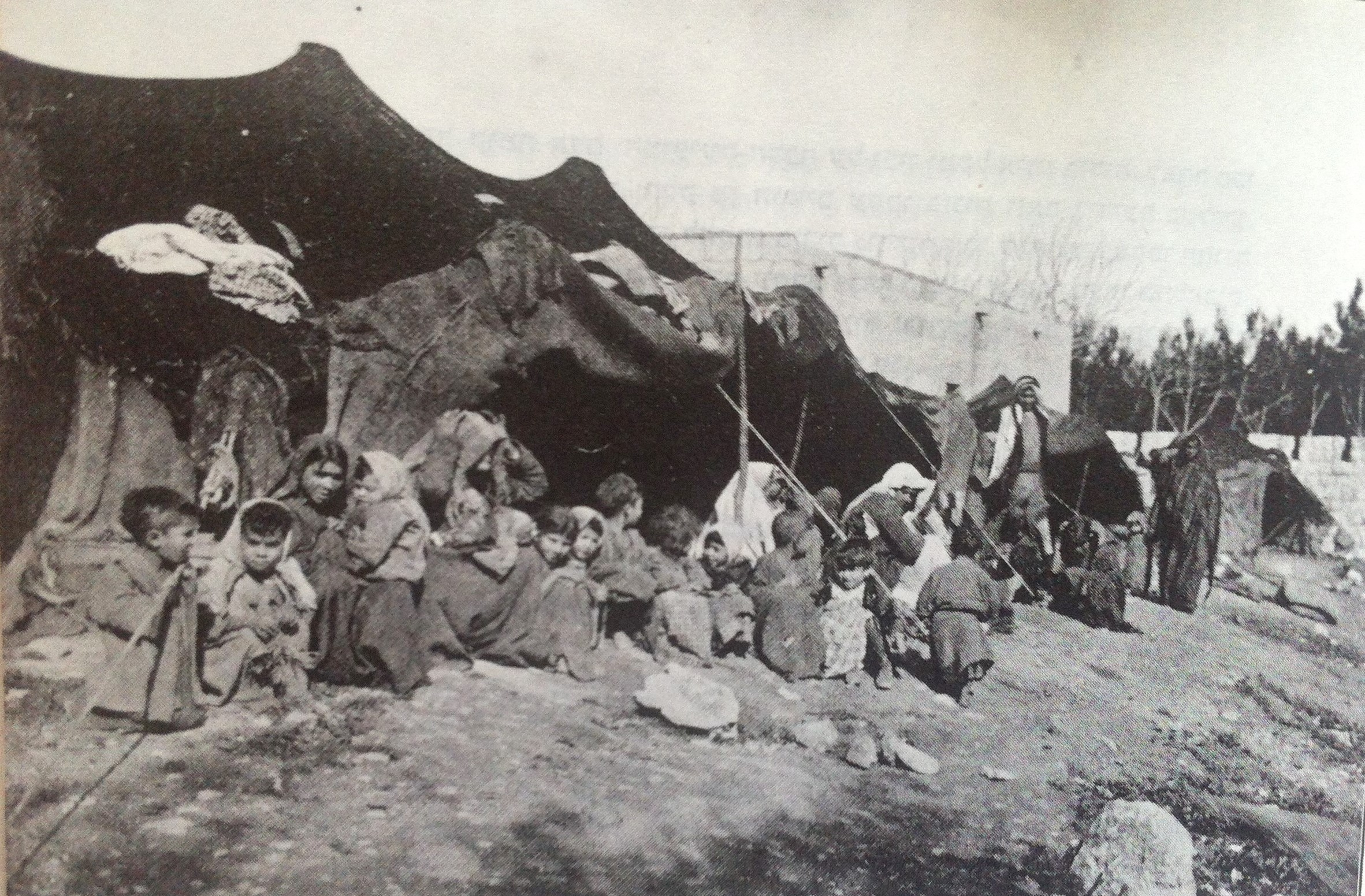
- Domari encampment north of the Damascus Gate in Jerusalem (1914)

Total population
- 2.2 million (estimated)

Regions with significant populations
- The Levant, North Africa, Eastern Anatolia, Iraq, and Azerbaijan
- Syria: 300,000
- Iraq: 200,000
- Egypt: 100,000
- Jordan: 70,000
- Sudan: 50,000
- Tunisia: 20,000
- Libya: 10,000
- Israel: 9,600
- Lebanon: 8,000
- Palestine: 700-7,900

Languages
- Majority: Domari; Minority: Arabic · Hebrew · Kurdish

Religion
- Islam

Related ethnic groups
- Ashkali and Balkan Egyptians, Domba, Ghorbati, Lom, Romani, Abdals, Millets

The Dom (also called Domi; Arabic: دومي / ALA-LC: Dūmī, دومري / Dūmrī, Ḍom / ضوم or دوم, or sometimes also called Doms) are descendants of the Dom caste with origins in the Indian subcontinent, who through ancient migrations are found scattered across the Middle East and North Africa, the Eastern Anatolia region, Syria, Iraq, and Azerbaijan. The traditional language of the Dom is Domari, an endangered Indo-Aryan language, thereby making the Dom an Indo-Aryan ethnic group.

The Doms were formerly grouped with other traditionally itinerant ethnic groups originating from medieval India: the Rom and Lom peoples. However, these groups left India at different times and used different routes. The Domari language has a separate origin in India from Romani. Dom people do not identify themselves as Romanies.

== Culture ==
The Dom have an oral tradition and express their culture and history through music, poetry, and dance. Initially, it was believed that they were a branch of the Romani people, but recent studies of the Domari language suggest that they departed from the Indian subcontinent at different times and using different routes.

Chait (Spring season) folk song practiced by the Dom community in Odisha, India

Among the various Domari subgroups, they were initially part of Ghawazi who were known for their dancing and music business. Some Muslim Roma may share Dom ancestry too, because in the travel book Seyahatnâme, written by the Ottoman Turkish traveller Evliya Çelebi in 1668, he explained that the Romani from Komotini (Gümülcine) believe that their ancestors originated in Ottoman Egypt. Also the sedentary Romani groups from Serres region in Greece believe their ancestors were once taken from Ottoman Egypt by the Turks after 1517 to Rumelia, to work on the tobacco plantations of Turkish feudal landlords that were based there.

Muslim Roma settled in Baranya and the city of Pécs in southwestern Hungary. After the Siege of Pécs (1686), when the Habsburgs took it back, Muslim Roma and some other Muslim ethnic minorities abandoned Islam and converted to Christianity, choosing the Roman Catholic faith in the years 1686–1713. The Ghagar, a subgroup of the Doms in Egypt, say that some of them went to Hungary.

Domari cuisine includes dishes such as Kufta bi Tahineh (meatballs in tahini sauce), musakhan (chicken with caramelized onions and almonds served on flatbread), and danan al aut (delicate dumplings). Reflecting their nomadic past and present-day community in Jerusalem, Domari cooking features spices from diverse regions and commonly uses seasonal vegetables, rice, and meat. The Domari Society, a non-profit organization based in Jerusalem, supports this distinctive culinary tradition by offering traditional Domari meals prepared by women from the community. Domari cuisine includes dishes influenced by local Arab cuisine and Palestinian cuisine, such as stuffed vegetables like Mahshi Beitinjan and Kusa. Common ingredients include olive oil, yogurt, lemon juice, curry leaves, and dried mint. In Domari culture, food is not just about cooking but also about hospitality and sharing meals within the community. Despite living in very poor conditions, the Domari people value inviting others to eat together, as it brings happiness to all. Their spices originate from the various regions where nomadic Domari Gypsies have lived and have been handed down through generations.

Historically, earlier generations of the Dom were nomadic, engaging in nomadic professions such as blacksmithing, horse trading, music, dance, and animal healing. However, for more than a century, the Dom community has adopted a sedentary way of life.

== Language ==
Domari shows Turkic, Kurdish and Arabic influence. Domari in the Middle East is known as Nawari.

== Distribution ==
The Dom people, with an estimated population of 1.4 million, predominantly inhabit regions spanning Turkey, Egypt, Jordan, Palestinian territories, Israel, Lebanon, Saudi Arabia, Iraq and Iran. The actual population is believed to surpass this estimate, given that some Dom individuals are left out of official national censuses, and others identify themselves using national labels rather than the term "Dom."

There is a large concentration of Doms in Jordan, where they call themselves Bani Murra. Researchers have written that "they accommodate Arab racism by hiding their ethnic identity", since they would not be accepted into Arab societies once their true identity is revealed due to the anti-Romani sentiment that is prevalent in the Arab world. Their community numbers around 70,000 in Jordan, according to estimates in 2015.

A small community in east Jerusalem lives in Bab Huta neighborhood, in the Old City of Jerusalem. The population in Jerusalem is around 15,000.

The population in Lebanon is estimated to be around 3,112.

The population of Doms in the West Bank and Gaza Strip is estimated to be about 7900.

== Al-Nawar ==
Al-Nawar (Arabic: نور) is an Arabic term for several nomad communities used primarily in Jordan, Syria, Lebanon, and Palestine. The term, regarded as derogatory, is used by Arabs for several diverse ethnic groups. They have historically been called "Gypsies", though as a whole they are not Romani. The Dom people are especially known as Nawar. While both they and Romani people originated from the Indian subcontinent, they came from two drastically different ethnicities and cultures. The Nawar in Palestine are also known as Ghajars (gypsies).

The Nawar in Syria number 100,000 to 250,000 people according to estimations. The vast majority is sedentary.

== Contemporary Issues ==
In many countries in the Middle East, the Dom are among the most socially marginalized minorities. In Syria, the terms used to refer to them—‘'Nawar’', ‘'Qurbat’', ‘'Zatt’', and ‘'Ghajar’'—are explicitly considered derogatory, while many Dom conceal their identity due to discrimination. In Palestinian society, the Dom occupy the lowest rung of the social hierarchy, even though they bear Arabic names and are Muslims. They mostly live in poverty in extended families. The situation is similar in Lebanon and Jordan. Their social situation is thus similar to that of many Romani groups in Eastern Europe.

The social situation of many Dom is characterized by poverty, informal employment, limited schooling, precarious housing conditions, and restricted access to government services. In Syria, before the war, many Dom worked as seasonal laborers, day laborers, musicians, scrap dealers, blacksmiths, or in other informal occupations; at the same time, the majority society often assigned them occupations that were marginalized or considered lowly. The situation is particularly problematic for groups without complete documentation. While settled Dom in Syria were often registered as Syrian citizens, families living informally frequently lacked identification cards, passports, or birth certificates, which made access to education, healthcare, legal employment, and humanitarian aid difficult. In other countries, such as Iraq, members of the Dom minority are often stateless, either by choice (e.g., to avoid military service) or due to discrimination by the authorities.

== See also ==
- Doms in Egypt
- Doms in Iraq
- Doms in Israel
- Doms in Jordan
- Doms in Lebanon
- Doms in Libya
- Doms in Palestine
- Doms in Sudan
- Doms in Syria
- Doms in Tunisia
- Ghorbati, community in Iran and Afghanistan
- History of the Romani people
- Sinti
- Zott
- Zuṭṭ
