= Domari language =

Indo-Aryan language

Domari
- Dōmʋārī, Dōmʋārī ǧib, Dômarî ĵib, دٛومَرِي, דּוֹמָרִי
- Native to: Azerbaijan, Mauritania, Iran, Iraq, Israel, Lebanon, Egypt, Libya, Tunisia, Algeria, Morocco, Pakistan, Palestine, Syria, Turkey, Jordan, Sudan, and perhaps neighboring countries
- Region: Middle East and North Africa, Caucasus, Central Asia
- Ethnicity: Dom
- Native speakers: 280,000 (2015)
- Language family: Indo-European: Indo-Iranian; Indo-Aryan; Central; Domari
- Dialects: Northern Domari; Southern Domari
- Writing system: Latin, Arabic, Hebrew

Language codes
- ISO 639-3: rmt
- Glottolog: doma1258
- Domari is classified as Severely Endangered by the UNESCO; Atlas of the World's Languages in Danger.

Domari is an endangered Indo-Aryan language, spoken by Dom people scattered across the Middle East and North Africa. The language is reported to be spoken as far north as Azerbaijan and as far south as central Sudan, in Turkey, Iran, Iraq, Israel, Palestine, Jordan, Egypt, Sudan, Libya, Tunisia, Algeria, Morocco, Syria and Lebanon. Based on the systematicity of sound changes, it is known with a fair degree of certainty that the names Domari and Romani derive from the Indo-Aryan word ḍom. Although, Domari is a Central Indo-Aryan languages and Romani is a Western Indo-Aryan language. The Arabs referred to them as Nawar as they were a nomadic people that originally immigrated to the Middle East from the Indian subcontinent.

Domari is also known as "Middle Eastern Romani", "Tsigene", "Luti", or "Mehtar". There is no standard written form. In the Arab world, it is occasionally written using the Arabic script and has many Arabic and Persian loanwords. Descriptive work was done by Yaron Matras, who published a comprehensive grammar of the language along with a historical and dialectological evaluation of secondary sources.

Domari is an endangered language, as there is currently pressure to shift away from it in younger generations, according to Yaron Matras. In certain areas such as Jerusalem, only about 20% of the Dom people speak the Domari language in everyday interactions. The language is mainly spoken by the elderly in the Jerusalem community. The younger generation are more influenced by Arabic, therefore most only know basic words and phrases. The modern-day community of Doms in Jerusalem was established by the nomadic people deciding to settle inside the Old City from 1940 until it came under Israeli administration in 1967 (Matras 1999).

== Dialects ==
The best-known variety of Domari is Palestinian Domari, also known as "Syrian Gypsy", the dialect of the Dom community of Jerusalem, which was described by R.A. S. Macalister in the 1910s. Palestinian Domari is an endangered language, with fewer than 200 speakers, the majority of the 1,200 members of the Jerusalem Domari community being native speakers of Palestinian Arabic.

Other dialects include:

- Nawari in Syria, Jordan, Lebanon, Palestine and Egypt.
- Kurbati in Syria
- Helebi in Egypt, Libya, Tunisia, Algeria and Morocco
- Halab/Ghajar in Sudan.
- Karachi (Garachi) in northern Turkey, northern Iran and the Caucasus
- Marashi in Turkey
- Barake in Syria

Some dialects may be highly divergent and not mutually intelligible. Published sources often lump together dialects of Domari and the various unrelated in-group vocabularies of diverse peripatetic populations in the Middle East. Thus, the Ghorbati and Lyuli were previously thought to speak a dialect of Domari. There is also no obvious connection between Domari and the vocabulary used by the Helebi of Egypt (see discussion in Matras 2012, chapter 1).

== Status ==
In the 1940s, the Dom began to abandon their nomadic culture and began settling and working in the local economy. This led to the next phenomenon: the assimilation of Dom children in the primary school system, which marked the first generation to grow up in an academic environment alongside Arab children. Consequently, this 1940 generation do not fluently speak the Domari language. Arabic replaced their native Domari, and became the language of cross-generation communication. In Jerusalem, it is estimated there are about 600-900 members of the Dom population in Jerusalem. Less than 10% can effectively communicate in Jerusalem Domari.

== Comparison with Romani ==
Domari was once thought to be the "sister language" of Romani, the two languages having split after the departure from the Indian subcontinent, but more recent research suggests that the differences between them are significant enough to treat them as two separate languages within the Central (Hindustani) group of languages. The Dom and the Rom are most likely to be descendants of two different migration waves out of India, separated by several centuries. According to Matras:

There is, in other words, no evidence that Domari and Romani ever constituted a single language, at any period in their development: but there is on the other hand plenty of evidence that they underwent shared developments as a result of sharing the same geo-linguistic environments during successive periods.

— Yaron Matras, A Grammar of Domari

There remain similarities between the two, aside from their shared Central zone Indic origin, indicating a period of shared history as itinerant populations in the Middle East. These include: shared archaisms, which have been lost in the Central Indo-Aryan languages over the millennia since Dom/Rom emigration, a series of innovations connecting them with the Northwestern zone group, indicating their route of migration out of India, and a number of radical syntactical changes, due to superstrate influence of Middle Eastern languages, including Persian, Arabic and Byzantine Greek.

== Phonology ==
=== Vowels ===
There are five main vowel sounds; however, this inventory shows the variation and quantity of short vowels. Most are interchangeable with a vowel sound next to it; however, all of the sounds produced above are identical to the local Palestinian Arabic.

	Front	Central	Back
High	ɪ iː		ʊ uː
Mid	ɛ eː	ə ~ [ʌ] ~ [ɜ]	ɔ oː
Low		ɑ aː	

=== Consonants ===
Most of these consonants are influenced by Palestinian Arabic such as gemination; however, consonants such as [p], [ɡ], [tʃ] and [h] are not found in the local dialect. There is speculation among linguists that these sounds are considered a part of the pre-Arabic component. Alveopalatal affricates such as [tʃ] and [dʒ] are also consonants that differ in sound from Arabic.

		Bilabial	Labio- dental	Dental		Post- alveolar	Palatal	Velar	Uvular	Pharyngeal	Glottal
		Bilabial	Labio- dental	plain	phar.	Post- alveolar	Palatal	Velar	Uvular	Pharyngeal	Glottal
Plosive/ Affricate	voiceless	p		t̪	t̪ˤ	t͡ʃ		k	q		ʔ
Plosive/ Affricate	voiced	b		d̪	d̪ˤ	d͡ʒ		ɡ	(ɢ)		
Fricative	voiceless	(ɸ)	f	s̪	s̪ˤ	ʃ		x	(χ)	ħ	h
Fricative	voiced	(β)	v	z̪	z̪ˤ	ʒ		ɣ	(ʁ)	ʕ	
Nasal		m		n̪				(ŋ)			
Approximant			(ʋ)	l̪	ɫ̪		j	w			
Flap				ɾ							

=== Stress ===
The biggest difference in expression of language between Arabic and Domari is where the stress is placed. Arabic has phoneme-level stress while Domari is a language of word-level stress. The Domari language emphasizes stress on the final syllable, as well as grammatical markers for gender and number. Most nouns, besides proper nouns, adopted from Arabic sound distinct because of the unique stresses in Domari. Domari is thought to have borrowed many words and grammatical structures from Arabic; however, this is not entirely true. Complex verbs and most core prepositions did not transfer into the realms of grammar of the Domari language. The syntactic typology remains independent of Arabic influence. It also important to note that the numerals used by the Doms were inherited from Kurdish. Even though Domari was influenced by local Arabic, the language also felt the impacts of Kurdish and certain dialects of Iranian in the grammar of the language.

== Numerals ==
Here is a table of the numerals (1–10, 20, and 100) in Hindi, Romani, Domari, Lomavren, Kurdish and Persian for comparison.

Numeral	Hindi	Romani	Domari	Lomavren	Kurdish	Persian
1	ek	ekh, jekh	yek, yika	yak, yek	yak	yek
2	do	duj	dî	luy	du	do
3	tīn	trin	tirin	tərin	se	se
4	cār	štar	ŝtar	iŝdör	čwar, čar	čahār, čār
5	pāñc	pandž	panĵ	penĵ	penc	panǰ
6	che	šov	ŝaŝ	ŝeŝ	ŝaŝ	šeš
7	sāt	ifta	hawt, hoft	haft	hawt	haft
8	āṭh	oxto	hayŝt, haytek	haŝt	hašt	hašt
9	nau	inja	nu	nu	no	nuh, noh
10	das	deš	dez	las	da	dah
20	bīs	biš	wîs	vist	bist	bist
100	sau	šel	say	say	sa(d), sat	sad

== Bibliography ==
- Friedman, Victor A. (2014). "A Grammar of Domari by Yaron Matras (review)". Romani Studies. 24 (2): 227–231. ISSN 1757-2274.
- Hancock, Ian (n.d.). "On Romani Origins and Identity". RADOC. Archived from the original on 2011-07-17.
- Herin, Bruno (2012a). "The Domari Language of Aleppo (Syria)" (PDF). Linguistic Discovery. 10 (2). doi:10.1349/PS1.1537-0852.A.412.
- Hérin, Bruno (March 7, 2013). "Review of A Grammar of Domari".
- Herin, Bruno (2016). "Elements of Domari Dialectology". Mediterranean Language Review. 23: 33–73. doi:10.13173/medilangrevi.23.2016.0033. ISSN 0724-7567. JSTOR 10.13173/medilangrevi.23.2016.0033.
- Matras, Yaron (1996). "Domari" (PDF). In Brown, Keith (ed.). Encyclopedia of Language and Linguistics. Oxford: Elsevier. Archived from the original (PDF) on 2013-10-29.
- Matras, Yaron (1999). "The state of present-day Domari in Jerusalem". Mediterranean Language Review. 11: 1–58. JSTOR 10.13173/medilangrevi.11.1999.0001.
- Matras, Yaron (2000). "Two Domari Legends about the origins of the Doms" (PDF). Romani Studies. 10 (1): 49–75. doi:10.3828/rs.2000.3. Archived from the original (PDF) on 2014-12-17.
- Matras, Yaron (2005). "Language contact, language endangerment, and the role of the 'salvation linguist'". Language Documentation and Description. Vol. 3.
- Matras, Yaron (2012). A grammar of Domari (PDF). Mouton Grammar Library. Berlin: De Gruyter Mouton. doi:10.1515/9783110291421. ISBN 978-3-11-028914-5.
- Rao, Aparna (n.d.). "Peripatetics of Iraq, Syria, Lebanon, Jordan, Israel, Egypt, Sudan, and Yemen". Encyclopedia of World Cultures.
- Williams, G. A. (Spring–Summer 2000). "The Gypsies of Lebanon: A DRC Update, April 2000". KURI: Journal of the Dom Research Center. 1 (2). Archived from the original on 2017-12-27.
