= Ghorbati people =

Ethnic group in Iran, Afghanistan and Central Asia

The Ghorbati are an ethnic group and originally a nomadic community in Iran, Afghanistan, South Asia, West Asia and Central Asia. They are widespread in Iran, from where they have migrated to other regions over the centuries. Many are Shia, with a significant Sunni minority. They either trace their ancestry to Sassanid Persia, or to Arabs, including Syeds

In 1976–77, the Ghorbati in Afghanistan numbered 1,000 families (ca. 5,000 people).

== Occupation ==
Their traditional occupations include carpentry, smithery, peddling, manufacturing and selling domestic goods, writing prayers, and dealing with livestock. Older women practiced fortune telling and healing. Because of female participation in the workforce, which goes against the established gender norms of the region, they are looked down upon by non-Ghorbat.

The sieve-makers are known as Ghalbelbaf and Chighalbaf in Afghanistan, Kalbilbof in Tajikistan, and Ghirbalband in Iran. Some also had governmental or religious roles. Overall, they were Afghan citizens; they held ID cards and were conscripted, unlike the related Mugat "Jogi" community.

== Language ==
Their mother tongue is Persian, but they have their own dialect known as Ghorbati, which is a secret language with a heavy Persian base — also known as Mogadi (in Shiraz), Magadi (in Herat) and Qazulagi (in Kabul).

== History ==
Historically, they were part of the Banu Sassan, a medieval Islamic guild of beggars, rogues, criminals, charlatans, entertainers, tricksters, astrologers, Sufis and preachers, which comprised the group with the highest status. They were of heterogeneous ethnic origin. The name Ghorbat seems to have originated from the Banu Sassan, when they renamed themselves Bani Al Ghuraba’ (the tribe of Exile). The modern Ghorbati vocabulary can be traced back to them.

== Name confusion ==
The Ghorbati have mainly been confused with the Dom people who are also known as Qurbat or Kurbat (Arabic: قرباط/كربات), and this is further cognate with the Romani name Gurbeti, but there is no proof of any historical connection between these groups other than some vocabulary, and most Ghorbati (except some like the Multani Mugat Ghorbat and the “Garachi” Dom) are believed to be nomads who move eastwards rather than being of Indian origin like the Koli, Roma and Dom. Across regions the exonyms used to refer to these groups overlap; these words are often used regardless of what tribe is being described. The slur ghorbati has been used by some Iranians for people that were displaced during the Iran-Iraq war.

== Status ==
Ghorbats from Iran have also migrated to Maharashtra and other parts of India in the 1970s, although some subgroups were already present in Mughal India since the 16th century. Other alternative translations write the group's name as Ghorbat, Gurbat, Ghurbati, Qorbat. They are a severely marginalised minority in Iran, suffering from a range of social problems. Some Iranians consider the Ghorbati community to be "Pakistani mafia".

== See also ==
- Peripatetic groups of Afghanistan
- Kowliye – perhaps related to the Ghorbat (although this is not known for sure as the groups in Iraq might be ethnic Dom)
