= Zott =

Arabic term for Dom and Romani people

Zott (Arabic: زط; singular Zottī) is the Arabic term for Romani (also known as Gypsies) and Dom peoples. The Zott were musicians who migrated in great numbers from northern India to the Middle East about 1000 years ago. Their name was later applied to any itinerant entertainer of Indian origin; and came to be the common name of the Dom people in the Middle East. Al-Qāmūs al-Muḥīṭ glosses the term as equivalent to Nawar (singular Nawarī).

It is believed the term is derived from Zuṭṭ (in turn Arabicised from Jat), with the Zott being at least partially descended from the medieval Zuṭṭ.

== See also ==
- Doma (caste)
