= Itinerant groups in Europe =

Traditionally nomadic groups in Europe

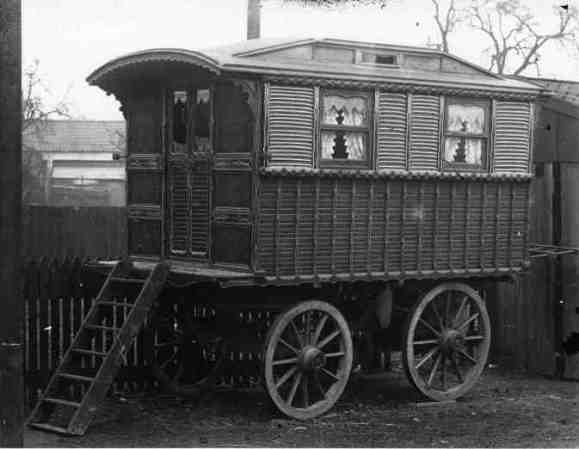
A showman's wagon, used for accommodation and transportation

There are a number of traditionally itinerant or travelling groups in Europe.

Itinerant groups are communities that travel habitually from place to place rather than living in one permanent location. The origins of the traditionally itinerant groups in Europe are not always clear. The largest of these groups is the Romani people (also known as Roma or Gypsies, with the latter being increasingly taken as derogatory). They left India around 1,500 years ago, entering Europe around 1,000 years ago via the Balkans. They include the Sinti people, the second largest group. Travellers, assumed to have begun travelling from necessity during the early modern period, are unrelated to the Romani, and are assumed not to be ethnically distinct from their source population. However, recent DNA testing has shown that the Irish Travellers are of Irish origin but are genetically distinct from their settled counterparts due to social isolation, and more groups are being studied. The third largest group in Europe is the Yenish, an indigenous Germanic group.

Many itinerant groups speak their own language or dialect, though with outsiders they will use the language of the surrounding settled population. Such insider languages are often a blend of the regional settled language and Romani language, but sometimes a cant based on a regional language without Romani influence. As opposed to nomads, who travel with and subsist on herds of livestock, itinerant groups traditionally travel for trade or other work for the sedentary populations amongst which they live.

== Indigenous Dutch Travellers (Woonwagenbewoners) ==
Indigenous Dutch Travellers, known in the Netherlands as caravan dwellers (woonwagenbewoners), were first recorded as a population in the 1879 census, but have existed since the advent of industrial mechanization in the first half of the 19th century. They travelled in search of work. They practised traditional crafts: chair bottomers; tinsmiths; broom binders; peddlers. As of 2018, some 30,000–60,000 Travellers live in the Netherlands, most of whom are Catholics living in the south of the country. Many Travellers used to speak a cant language, Bargoens, and a derivative sociolect continues to exist.

Living in trailer parks or caravan camps gave rise to the pejorative name Kampers to refer to Dutch Travellers, while the latter prefer to call themselves Reizigers ('Travellers'). In turn, Travellers have used the term burger against those who live in regular housing. Similar to indigenous Norwegian Travellers, Dutch and Flemish Travellers are theorised to have Yenish (German) admixture.

== Indigenous Flemish Travellers (Voyageurs) ==
Voyageurs are an indigenous Flemish group who are related to the Dutch Travellers. The first Voyageurs slept in stables and barns they encountered in the countryside along the way. It was only later that they started building covered wagons, a simple cart with a tarpaulin over it, which they pulled themselves or for which they harnessed some dogs. Even later the horses came, and the hood carts grew into caravans.

These Voyageurs had their example in the intinerant way of life of mainly the Sinti. They partially adopted each other's customs, and mixed marriages were not uncommon. From this mixture of Romani and Western culture, a subculture of their own has emerged. Many also currently live in houses, which makes tracking them difficult. In addition, some are at such an advanced stage of integration into sedentary society that they do not know or deny that they are descendants of Voyageurs, ashamed of an ancestor who walked from door to door. Their number is currently estimated at 8,000, but could be much higher. They are spread all over Flanders.

== Indigenous Norwegian Travellers (Skøyere/Fantefolk) ==
Indigenous Norwegian Travellers (more commonly known as Fanter, Fantefolk or Skøyere) are an itinerant group who call themselves Reisende. Confusingly, this term is also used by Romanisæl, the Romani group of Norway and Sweden. Unlike the Romanisæl Travellers, the indigenous Norwegian Travellers are non-Romani by culture and origins, and they do not speak any form of Romani language. Instead, they use Rodi, a Norwegian dialect.

Similar to indigenous Dutch and Flemish Travellers, indigenous Norwegian Travellers are theorised to have Yenish (German Traveller) admixture and possibly could be descended from them. Norwegian Rodi includes a large proportion of Yenish loanwords. Rodi also has a handful of Scandoromani loanwords due to Romanisæl Travellers and indigenous Norwegian Travellers both living in close proximity to each other.

Indigenous Norwegian Travellers have always concentrated around Southern and Southwestern Norway along the coastline (which was separated from the rest of Norway due to mountains) and Romanisæl Travellers have always concentrated around Central Norway (specifically in Trøndelag county around the city of Trondheim). Historically, both groups have travelled all over, and often overlap into each other's traditional areas.

They are known to the settled majority population as fant or fanter, but they prefer the term reisende ('travellers'). This term is also used by Romanisæl Travellers (the largest population of Romani people in Norway and Sweden), though the two groups are distinct. There are also groups in German-speaking countries who refer to themselves as reisende, which is German for 'travellers'. Eilert Sundt, a 19th-century sociologist, termed the indigenous Travellers småvandrer or småvandringer ('small travellers'), to contrast them with the Romanisæl (Tater) Travellers, which Sundt called storvandrer or storvandringer ('great travellers') who ranged further in their journeys.

== Irish Travellers (Pavee) ==
Irish Travellers are genetically Irish, albeit with a distinct language and culture from the settled Irish. They live predominantly in the Republic of Ireland, the United Kingdom, and the United States. Travellers refer to themselves as Mincéirí or Pavees in their language and as an Lucht Siúil (literally, "the walking people") in Irish. The language of the Irish Travellers, Shelta, is based primarily on an Irish lexicon and an English grammar. There are two dialects of the language: Gammon (or Gamin) and Cant. Shelta has been dated to the eighteenth century but may be older. The vast majority of Irish Travellers are Roman Catholics who maintain their traditions and culture in a close-knit community of families.

In 2011, an analysis of DNA from 40 Travellers showed that Irish Travellers are a distinct indigenous Irish ethnic minority who separated from the settled Irish community at some point between 1,000 and 2,000 years ago. The claim was made that they are as distinct from the settled community as Icelanders are from Norwegians.

Like other itinerant groups, the Travellers have often faced discrimination because of their ethnicity, and the issue persists. They were officially recognized as an ethnic group by the government of the Republic of Ireland on March 1, 2017.

== Romani ==
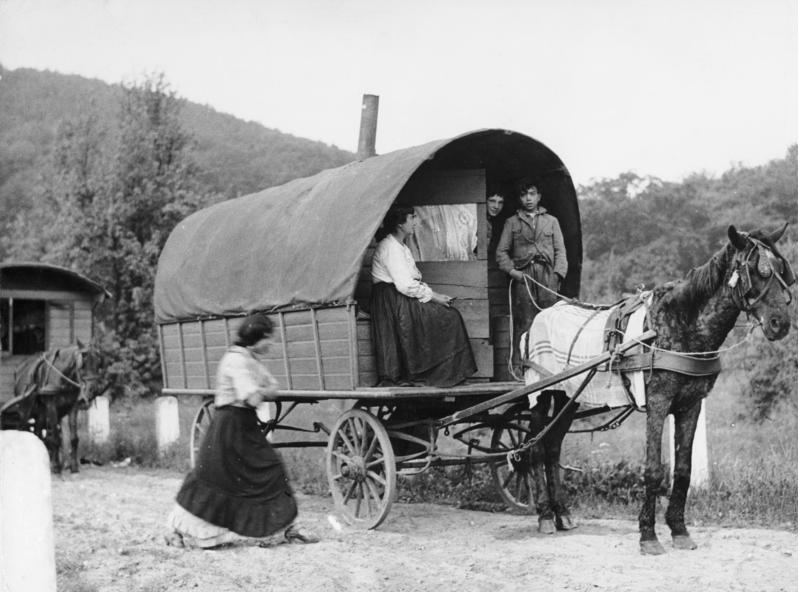
Sinti Romanies in the Rhineland, 1935

The best known traditionally itinerant community in Europe are the Romani people (also Romany, Romanies Tzigani, Rromani, and variants), though today most are not itinerant.

The Romani have Indo-Aryan roots and heritage and first entered Europe from South Asia via the Middle East around a thousand years ago. They spread further through Europe during the 15th and 16th centuries, separating into various subgroups in the process.

They traditionally speak Romani, an Indo-Aryan language.

Though most Romanis are settled, a minority amongst the following groups in Northern Europe maintain a travelling lifestyle:

- Romanichal in England (As well as North East Wales, South Wales and the Scottish Borders), with diaspora communities in the United States, Canada, South Africa, Australia and New Zealand.
- Kale in the Welsh-speaking parts of Northwestern Wales.
- Lowland Gypsies in Lowland Scotland.
- Romanisael in Central Norway and Sweden.
- Kaale in Finland and parts of Sweden.

These groups have mostly European DNA due to mixing with Indigenous Traveller groups (British Romani Travellers mix with Irish Travellers, Scottish Highland Travellers and Funfair Traveller and Scandinavian Romani Travellers mix with Indigenous Norwegian Travellers) and non-Travellers over the centuries. This has led to these Romani groups generally looking White in appearance.

It is also a reason why these groups speak mixed languages rather than more pure forms of Romani:

- Romanichal speak Angloromani (A mix of English and Romani).
- Romanisael speak Scandoromani (A mix of Norwegian, Swedish, and Romani).
- Lowland Gypsies speak Scottish Cant (A mix of Scots and Romani).
- Kale speak Kalá (A mix of Welsh, English, and Romani).
- Kaale speak Kalo (A mix of Finnish and Romani).

== Indigenous Scottish Highland Travellers ==
Scottish Highland Travellers are also known as Ceàrdannan ('craftsmen') in Scottish Gaelic. Other terms in English include the pejorative Black Tinkers and the more poetic Summer Walkers.

The Highland Traveller community has a long history in Scotland, going back to at least the 12th century. Historically, they would travel from village to village and would pitch their bow-tents on rough ground around the edge of a village and would earn money there as tinsmiths, hawkers, horse dealers, or pearl fishermen. Many found seasonal employment on farms (e.g., berry picking or during harvests). Nowadays, the majority of Highland Travellers have settled down into organized campsites or regular houses.

The Scottish Highland Travellers have their own (nearly extinct) language based on Scottish Gaelic called Beurla Reagaird. Highland Travellers are closely tied to their native Highlands and the native Gaelic-speaking population; they may follow an itinerant or a settled lifestyle. They have played an essential role in the preservation of traditional Gaelic culture. Travellers' contribution to Highland life has been as custodians of ancient Gaelic singing, storytelling, and folklore traditions. It is estimated that only 2,000 Highland Travellers remain leading their traditional lifestyle.

== Yenish Travellers ==
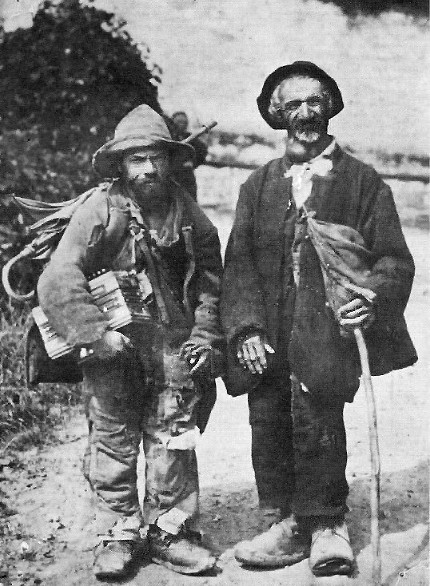
Two Jenische in Muotathal, Switzerland, c. 1890

In German-speaking Europe, France, and Wallonia (part of Belgium), there are the Yenish people (Jenische or Yeniche in German and French, respectively). An early description of this group was published by Johann Ulrich Schöll in 1793.

== Funfair travellers (showmen) ==
Showmen (also known as showpeople, showfolk, funfair travellers, travelling showpeople, and the pejorative carnies) are not an ethnic group, but occupational travellers, the members of multi-generational families who own and operate travelling funfairs and circuses, who move around as part of their work. These groups formed across Europe, and included the families of travelling markets, funfairs, carnivals, and circuses, which required frequent mobility. These groups usually follow a set pattern of yearly nomadism. Membership of these groups has, over the years, been drawn from other communities. For example, showpeople in Great Britain and Ireland often had a mix of English, Scottish, Welsh, Irish, and/or Traveller (typically Romanichal Traveller and Irish Traveller) heritage.

As a result, funfair travellers are not defined as an ethnic group themselves, even though they display certain common features, and in some countries (such as the UK) they identify as a cultural group. In anthropological and sociological terms, they form a subculture.

Funfair travellers often sport unique cultures and self-identity, and they tend to be insular, favouring marriage within the community, which results in long lineages and a strong sense of cultural homogeneity. For example, the Showman's Guild of Great Britain requires that applicants have a parent from the funfair travelling community.

Many funfair travellers in the fairground and circus business across Europe have partial Romani heritage, evidenced by significant traces of the Romani language. Despite this, the roots, culture, traditions, and identity of showman groups have remained separate from Romani groups.

== Camminanti ==
The Camminanti is an ethnic group in Sicily, originating from the end of the 14th century. They have historically lived a nomadic life.

== See also ==
- Gens du voyage (France)
- Gypsy (term)
- New Age Travellers
- Nomadic peoples of Europe
- Vagrancy (people)
