= Romani people in the United Kingdom =

Romane manusha ando Jekhethano Them (Romani)
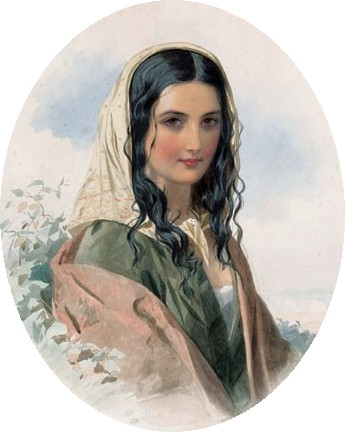
- A portrait of a Romani woman by English painter Octavius Oakley

Total population
- United Kingdom: ≈ 225,000 – 0.4% (European Commission estimate, 2012); England: 99,122 – 0.2% (2021); Scotland: Unavailable; Wales: 1,842 – 0.06% (2021); Northern Ireland: 1,529 – 0.08% (2021)

Regions with significant populations
- North West England and Greater London

Languages
- Angloromani, Scottish Cant, Kalá

Religion
- Christianity (71.8%), Islam (2.0%)

Romani people have been recorded in the countries that became the United Kingdom since at least the early 16th century. There are estimated to be around 225,000 Romani people residing in the UK. This includes the Romanichal, Kalé and a sizeable population of recent Romani migrants from mainland Europe, particularly Central and Eastern Europe, the bulk of whom immigrated into the UK in the late 1990s/early 2000s and after EU expansion in 2004. They are considered part of the Gypsy (Romani), Roma and Traveller (GRT) community. In the UK, Romanies are classified as white. However, some Romanies do not identify as white, as historical persecution has contributed to an "uncertain whiteness" that sets them apart from other white groups.

== England ==
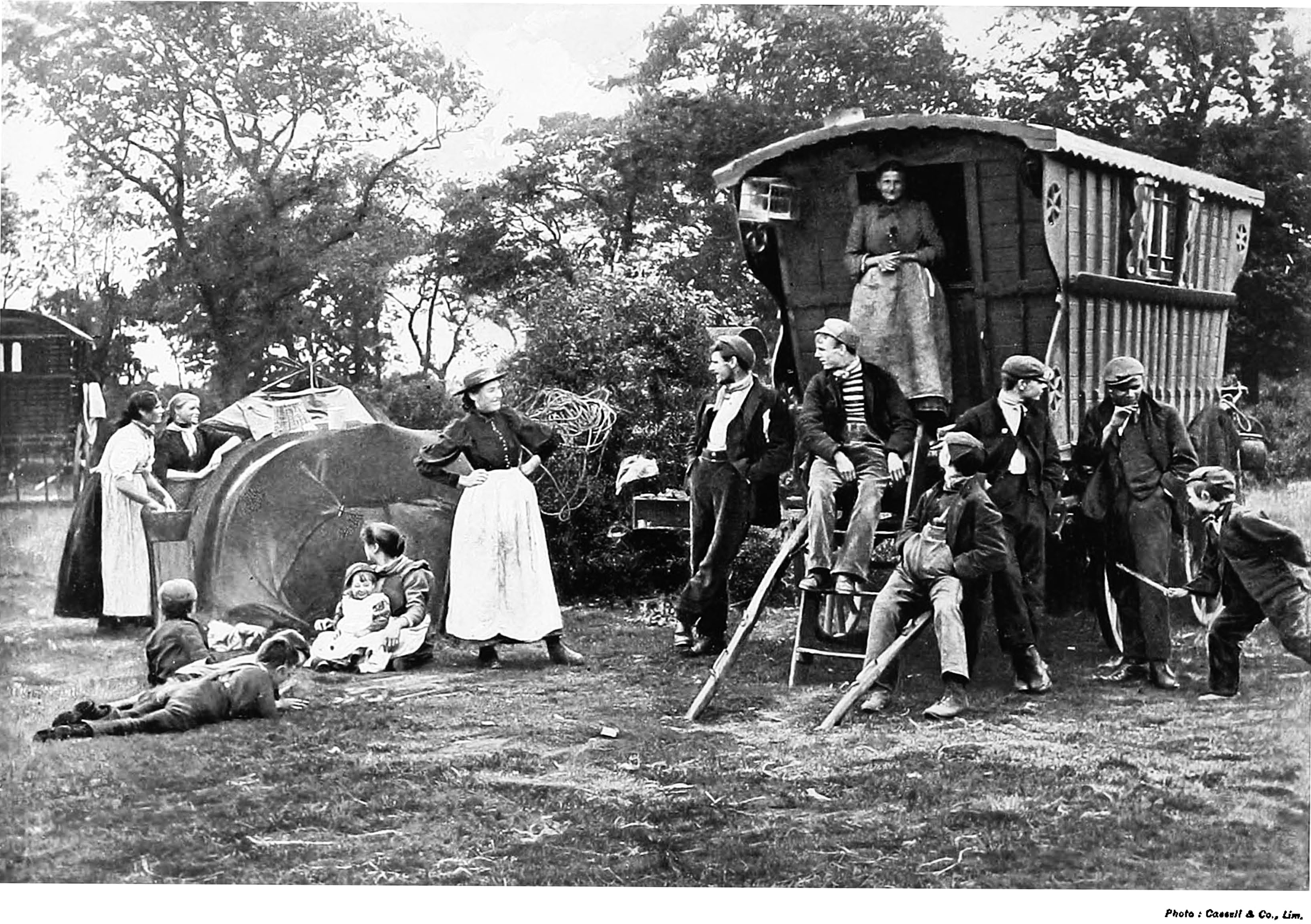
A Romani encampment in Essex, England, c. 1897-1899

Romanichal (commonly known as "English Gypsies") are a Romani subgroup in England. The first Romanies arrived in England in the 16th century. Romanichal predominantly live in England, but also in South Wales, Northeast Wales and the Scottish Borders. Most Romanichal speak English and Angloromani. There exists a north–south divide between Romanichal in Southern and Northern England, with the two groups' dialects differing in pronunciation and vocabulary.

== Wales ==
Kalé are a Romani subgroup in Wales. The first Romanies arrived in Wales in the 16th century. Kale predominantly live in the Welsh-speaking parts of Northwestern Wales and speak Romnimus. The Romani population in Wales is estimated to be around 3,000.

== Scotland ==
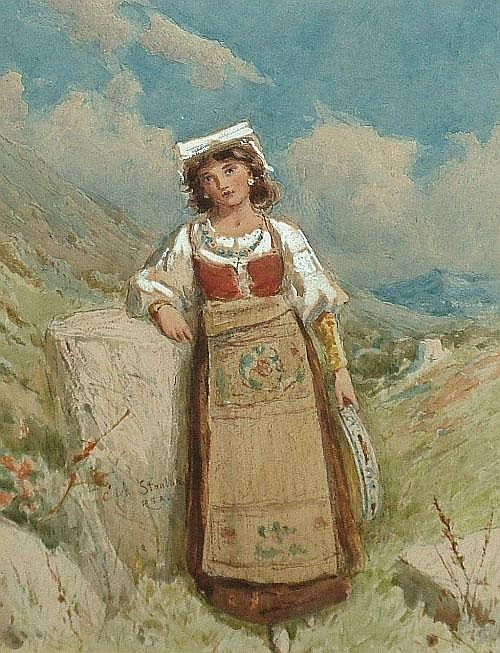
Gypsy Woman with a Tambourine by George Clark Stanton, 19th century

According to the Scottish Traveller Education Programme, an estimated 20,000 Romanies and Travellers live in Scotland. Amongst the Romani people in Scotland are the Romanichal, Lowland Romanies in the Scottish Lowlands, and recent Romani migrants from mainland Europe, particularly Central and Eastern Europe.

The first recorded reference to "the Egyptians" appears to date from 1492, during the reign of James IV, when an entry in the Book of the Lord High Treasurer records a payment "to Peter Ker of four shillings, to go to the king at Hunthall, to get letters subscribed to the 'King of Rowmais'". Two days after, a payment of twenty pounds was made at the king's command to the messenger of the 'King of Rowmais'.

== Northern Ireland ==
Around 2,500 Romanies lived in Northern Ireland in 2016. Although Irish Travellers were sometimes incorrectly referred to as “gypsies” in the past, they are not Romani. Romani people in Northern Ireland are primarily recent Romani migrants from Continental Europe (primarily Romania, Slovakia, Hungary, Bulgaria and the Czech Republic). Romani people have also existed in relatively small numbers in Ireland for centuries due to historical migrations from Britain.

== Demographics ==
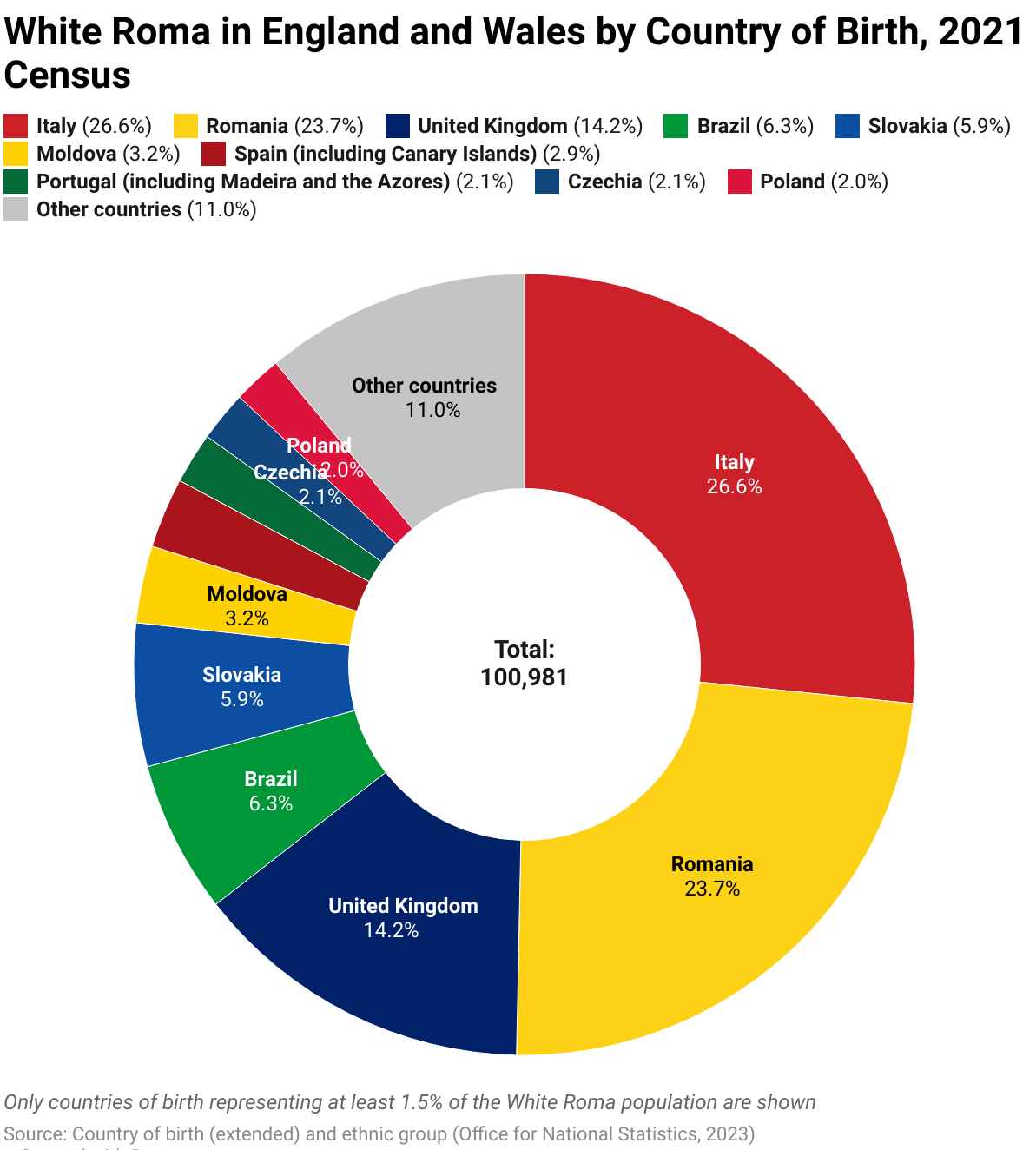
Country of birth (2021 census, England and Wales)

=== Religion ===
Romanies residing in the UK are predominantly Christian, with 71.8% of Romani in England and Wales identifying as Christian in the 2021 census compared to 46.2% of the wider population. The second largest group were those with no religion, constituting 17.6% of the Romani population in England and Wales. Muslims were the third largest group, constituting 2% of the Romani population in England and Wales.

Marime (or Mochadi) is a belief traditionally encompassed within Romanipen which, although not a religion, refers to the Romani concept of ritual impurity, relating to topics such as hygiene and human sexuality.

Religion	England and Wales	
Religion	2021	
Religion	Number	%
Christianity	72,485	71.8%
No religion	17,732	17.6%
Islam	2,028	2.0%
Buddhism	368	0.4%
Judaism	187	0.2%
Hinduism	58	0.06%
Sikhism	43	0.04%
Other religions	674	0.7%
Not Stated	7,405	7.3%
Total	100,980	100%

== Marginalisation ==
Romani people in the United Kingdom have historically experienced significant marginalisation and discrimination.

In 2005, Doncaster Borough Council discussed its review of Gypsy and Traveller needs and concluded that "Gypsies" and Irish Travellers are among the most vulnerable and marginalised ethnic minority groups in Britain.

In 2007, a study by the Equality and Human Rights Commission found that widespread prejudice against "Gypsy Traveller" communities persists in Wales.

In 2008, a report by the University of the West of Scotland found that both Scottish and UK governments had failed to safeguard the rights of the Roma as a recognised ethnic group and did not raise awareness of Roma rights within the UK.

In 2012, an Amnesty International report stated that "Gypsy Traveller" groups in Scotland routinely suffer widespread discrimination in society, as well as a disproportionate level of scrutiny in the media.

Since 2015, changes in policy have resulted in an ongoing widespread shortage of authorised encampment sites for nomadic communities, including traditionally nomadic Romani communities. In its 2019 electoral manifesto, the Conservative Party made a promise to "tackle unauthorised Traveller camps" to "protect our communities" by empowering police to arrest Travellers and seize their homes and property without compensation, continuing a long history of the criminalisation of Travellers in the United Kingdom. After success in that election, as of 2021, plans to implement these policies are proceeding.

== Culture ==
A variant of the Romani flag with the Union Jack added to the canton, designed by Shera Rom Billy Welch and usually featured at the Appleby Horse Fair.

Joe Grey or Joey Grey is a traditional British Romani stew. It typically includes sausages, bacon, onion, potatoes and tomatoes. Bacon pudding, meat pudding, rabbit pie, plum pudding, and apple dumplings (boiled not baked), are also popular among British Romanis. The dessert gypsy tart was named after the Roma and created in Kent to feed hungry Romani children. Hedgehogs were historically a popular delicacy among Romanis in the United Kingdom.

The Gypsy Vanner horse breed originated from the Romanichal community.

Big Fat Gypsy Weddings and Stacey Dooley: Growing Up Gypsy are some Romani television shows broadcast in the United Kingdom.

The Roma have made significant contributions to the music of the United Kingdom. Travellers and Romanichals intentionally alter harmony and meter with each performance of a song. Traditional singing styles are characterized by solo performances that are dramatic, slow-paced, and loud, while music is performed using portable instruments such as the fiddle, the Jew’s harp, the melodeon, or spoons.

Many British slang words such as ‘posh’, ‘pal’, ‘drag’, ‘kosh’ and ‘chav’ are derived from the Romani language.

Romani people brought fortune-telling methods such as palmistry to the United Kingdom.

British Romani people traditionally engaged in nomadic work such as harvesting fruit and hops, performing agricultural work, horse trading, and practising skilled trades like peg carving and basket weaving.

== British acts of legislation ==
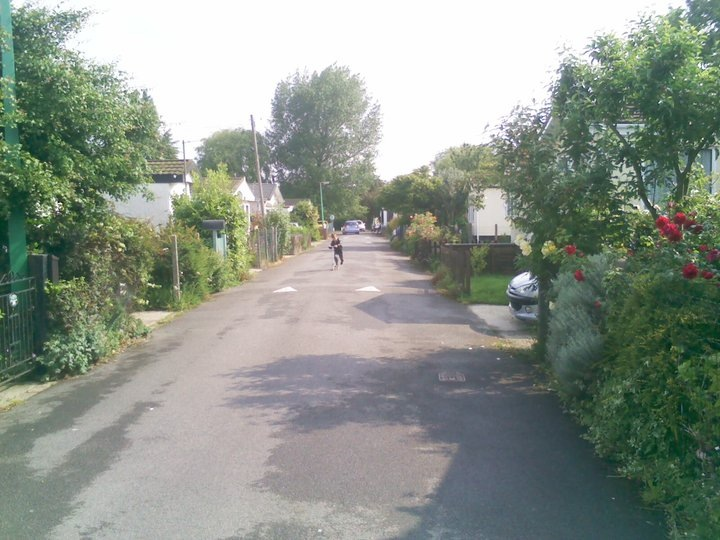
A Romanichal "atchin tan", or Romani site, as they are known in English

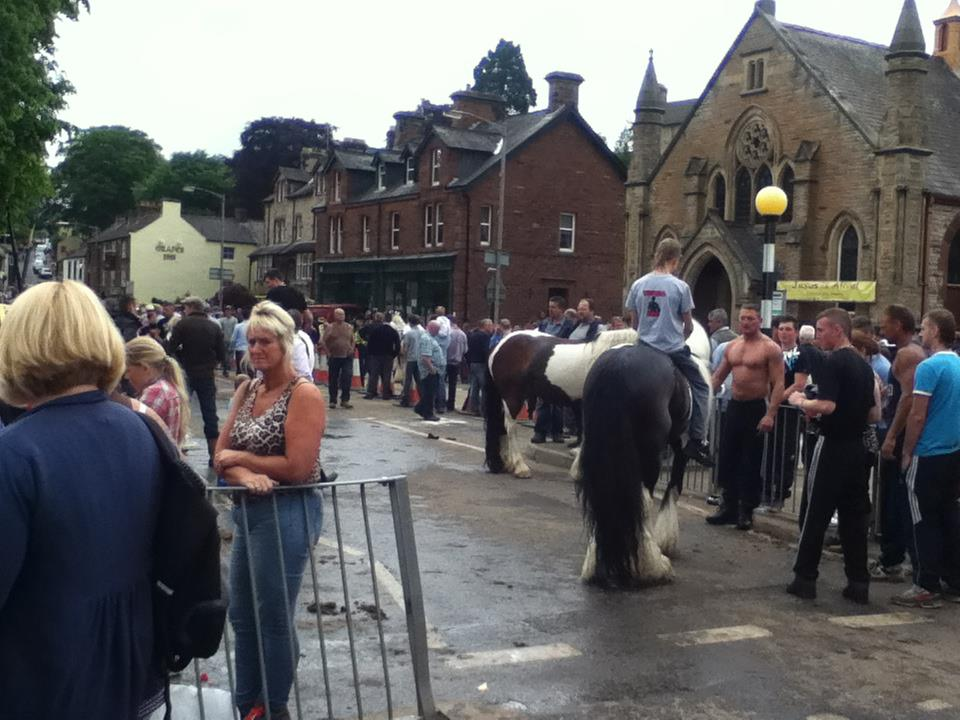
Horses on show at Appleby Horse Fair, England, Europe's largest Romani Horse Fair

=== 16th century laws ===
The Egyptians Act 1530 banned Romani people from entering England, requiring those already living there to leave within sixteen days under the threat of confiscation of property, imprisonment, and deportation. The Egyptian Act 1554 amended this law, removing the threat of punishment on the condition that Romani people abandon their "naughty, idle, and ungodly life and company" and adopt a settled, sedentary lifestyle. However, this same act also raised the penalty for noncompliance to death. Later, in 1562, new legislation was passed which permitted Romani people born in England and Wales to formally become English subjects but only if they assimilated into the local population, and the punishment of death remained for those who refused to assimilate.

=== 19th century laws ===
The Inclosure Act 1857 created the offence of injury or damage to village greens and interruption to its use or enjoyment as a place of exercise and recreation. The Commons Act 1876 makes encroachment or enclosure of a village green, and interference with or occupation of the soil, unlawful unless it is with the aim of improving enjoyment of the green.

=== 20th century laws ===
The Caravan Sites and Control of Development Act 1960 states that no occupier of land shall cause or permit the land to be used as a caravan site unless he is the holder of a site licence. It also enables a district council to make an order prohibiting the stationing of caravans on common land, or a town or village green. These acts had the overall effect of preventing travellers using the vast majority of their traditional stopping places.

The Caravan Sites Act 1968 required local authorities to provide caravan sites for travellers if there was a demonstrated need. This was resisted by many councils, who would claim that there were no Romanichals living in their areas. The result was that insufficient pitches were provided for travellers, leading to a situation whereby holders of a pitch could no longer travel, for fear of losing it.

The crisis of the 1960s, caused by the Caravan Sites Act 1968 (stopping new private sites being built until 1972), led to the appearance of the "British Gypsy Council" to fight for the rights of the Romani people in Britain.

The Criminal Justice and Public Order Act 1994, passed by the then Conservative government, removed local authorities' responsibility to provide sites, effectively limiting options for nomadic Travellers. Critics argued that this had the effect of criminalising their community, leaving Travellers with no option but to purchase unregistered new sites themselves.

=== Recent policy ===
In the UK, the issue of "Travellers" (referring to Romanichal Travellers, Irish Travellers, Funfair Travellers (Showmen), as well as other groups) became a 2005 general election issue, with the leader of the Conservative Party promising to review the Human Rights Act 1998. This law, which absorbs the European Convention on Human Rights into UK primary legislation, is seen by some to permit the granting of retrospective planning permission. Population pressures and limited availability of greenfield sites have led some Travellers to purchase land and establish residential settlements outside normal planning restrictions.

Romanichal Travellers and Irish Travellers argued in response that thousands of retrospective planning permissions are granted in Britain in cases involving non-Romani applicants each year and that statistics showed that 90% of planning applications by Travellers were initially refused by local councils, compared with a national average of 20% for other applicants.

== Famous people ==
- Adam Ant
- Alfie Best
- Charlie Chaplin
- Ian Hancock
- Bob Hoskins
- Jentina
- Cher Lloyd
- Robert Plant
- Connor Swindells
- Tracey Ullman

== See also ==
- Romanichal
- Romani Studies
- Welsh Romani language
- Welsh Kale
- Angloromani language
- Romani language
- Romani people
- History of the Romani people
- Anti-Romani sentiment
