= Languages of Wales =

- Official: Welsh; English (de facto)
- National: Welsh (17.8%), English
- Main: Welsh or English 96.7%; Polish 0.7%; Arabic 0.3%
- Foreign: Either French, German, Spanish or Mandarin
- Signed: British Sign Language
- Keyboard layout: QWERTY

The primary languages spoken in Wales are the two official languages: English (Note: De facto co-official language, and is the native language of a majority of Welsh people. English is used alongside Welsh in the Senedd.) and Welsh. The official languages of the Senedd (Welsh Parliament) are Welsh and English. According to the 2021 census, the Welsh-speaking population of Wales aged three or older was 17.8% (538,300 people) and nearly three quarters of the population in Wales said they had no Welsh language skills. Most of the remaining population primarily speak English.

== Official languages ==
Welsh is an official language of Wales, and is treated "no less favourably than the English language" as legislated in the Welsh Language (Wales) Measure 2011, with English as the other official language, although it's official status is not clarified in law. The de jure official languages of the Senedd are Welsh and English.

The Welsh Language (Wales) Measure 2011 recognises that Welsh is an official language in Wales and established a legal framework for a statutory duty on public bodies in Wales to comply with Welsh language standards. The legislation allows people to live through the medium of Welsh if they so wish. The legislation states "the Welsh language must not be treated less favourably than the English language". The 2011 measure also created the Welsh Language Commissioner post.

== Main language ==
In Wales, as of 2021, 96.7% of usual residents (2.9 million) aged three and above spoke Welsh or English as their main language. This is compared to 97.1% in 2011.

Of the 101,000 people in Wales who did not speak Welsh or English as a main language in 2021, 78.0% said they could speak English well or very well, similar to 77.1% in 2011. 22.0% of people who did not speak English or Welsh as a main language could not speak English very well or at all.

In both 2011 and 2021, Polish was the most spoken main language after Welsh and English, accounting for 0.7% of the population (21,000), up from 0.6% in 2011. Arabic was the next most common main language in Wales at 0.3%, up from 0.2% in 2011.

British Sign Language (BSL) was the preferred language of 900 (0.03%), up from 800 in 2011. An additional 300 usual residents used another form of sign language or communication system other than BSL.

== Welsh ==
Welsh is a Celtic language primarily spoken in Wales. It is the traditional language of Wales but was supplanted in large part by English, becoming a minority language in the early 20th century. For the year ending 30 June 2022, the Welsh Annual Population Survey showed that 29.7% (899,500) people aged three or older were able to speak Welsh. According to the 2021 census, 17.8% (538,300 people) of Wales' population, aged 3 or older, can speak Welsh, a decrease from 19% in 2011.

== English ==
=== Welsh English ===
Welsh English or Anglo-Welsh is the distinct form of English used in Wales.

Aside from lexical borrowings from Welsh like bach (little, wee), eisteddfod, nain and taid (grandmother and grandfather respectively), there exist distinctive grammatical conventions in vernacular Welsh English. Examples of this include the use by some speakers of the tag question isn't it? regardless of the form of the preceding statement and the placement of the subject and the verb after the predicate for emphasis, e.g. Fed up, I am or Running on Friday, he is.

In South Wales, the word "where" may often be expanded to "where to", as in the question, "Where to is your Mam?". The word "butty" is used to mean "friend" or "mate".

There is no standard variety of English that is specific to Wales, but such features are readily recognised by Anglophones from the rest of the UK as being from Wales, including the (actually rarely used) phrase look you which is a translation of a Welsh language tag.

== Welsh Romani ==
Welsh Romani (or Welsh Romany; sometimes also known as Kååle) is a variety of the Romani language which was spoken fluently in Wales until at least 1950. It was spoken by the Kale group of the Romani people who arrived in Britain during the 15th century. The first record of Roma in Wales comes from the 16th century. Welsh Romani is one of the many Northern Romani dialects.

== Sign languages ==
In 2017, the British Deaf Association claimed there were about 6,000 British Sign Language (BSL) users in Wales. Ongoing training and courses in BSL are offered in Wales by the Wales Council for Deaf People (WCDP), a voluntary umbrella organisation.

Makaton has limited use in Wales. It is not a sign language but a system using signs and symbols to help people who find speaking difficult, such as people with Down's Syndrome.

== Norman French and Latin ==
Isca Augusta, the ancient Roman amphitheatre at Caerleon

Latin is also used to a limited degree in certain official mottos, legal terminology (habeas corpus), and various ceremonial contexts. Latin abbreviations can also be seen on British coins. The use of Latin has declined greatly in recent years. At one time, Latin and Greek were commonly taught in British schools.

== See also ==
- Welsh toponymy
- Welsh Romani language
