= Para-Romani languages =

Non-Romani languages with considerable admixture from Romani spoken by Romani communities

Para-Romani are various mixed languages of non-Indo-Aryan linguistic classification containing considerable admixture from the Romani language. They are spoken as the traditional vernacular of Romani communities, either in place of, or alongside, varieties of the Romani language. Some Para-Romani languages have no structural features of Romani at all, taking only the vocabulary from Romani.

Reflecting the northern Indian subcontinent origin (in regions that are today part of India and Pakistan) of the Romani people, who for the last millennium have resided in dispersed locations predominantly throughout Europe, the linguistic makeup of most Para-Romani languages is based on Indo-European languages, except for Laiuse Romani (which is based on Estonian) and Erromintxela (which is based on Basque of the Basque region of Spain and France, separate from the Caló Iberian Romani language of Spain and Portugal based on the Romance languages of Iberia).

The phenomenon of Para-Romani languages is akin to Jewish languages (other than Hebrew) which are spoken by different communities of the Jewish diaspora and are heavily influenced by Hebrew, such as Yiddish (Judaeo-German) among Ashkenazi Jews, Ladino (Judaeo-Spanish) among Sephardic Jews, or Yevanic (Judaeo-Greek), Italkian (Judaeo-Italian), various Judeo-Arabic languages, etc.

== Varieties ==
=== Based on Indo-European languages ===
- Germanic-based
  - Angloromani
  - Scottish Cant
  - Scandoromani
- Greek-based
  - Romano-Greek
- Romance-based
  - †Germanía
    - Caló
- Slavic-based
  - †Bohemian Romani (which was moving towards being a Para-Romani variety prior to extinction)
  - Romano-Serbian

=== Based on non-Indo European languages ===
- Finnic-based
  - †Laiuse Romani (Estonian-based)
- Turkic-based
  - Romano-Turkish (Turkish-based)
  - Crimean-Romani (Crimean Tatar-based)
- Basque-based
  - Erromintxela

== See also ==
- Kurbet language
- Lomavren language
