= Laiuse Romani language =

Romani variety spoken in Estonia

Laiuse Romani
- Native to: Estonia
- Region: Laiuse
- Extinct: ca. 1940
- Language family: mixed Finnish Kalo–Estonian

Language codes
- ISO 639-3: None (mis)
- Glottolog: esto1257

Laiuse Romani was a Romani variety spoken in Estonia. It was a mixed language based on Romani and Estonian.

The Romani people first appeared in Estonia in the 17th century. According to rumors, they were first part of Swedish King Charles XII's Romani orchestra which he, after spending a winter in Laiuse, left behind. In 1841 all 44 Estonian Romani were collected and settled around Laiuse Parish. Their main stop was the village of Raaduvere, but they also lived in Rakvere, Jõgeva, and its precincts. Before the Second World War there were 60 Romani in Laiuse. Laiuse Romani became extinct in the German occupation, when all its speakers were killed by the Nazis during the Porajmos.

== Linguistic features ==
Laiuse Romani shares a number of linguistic features with Finnish Kalo, such as palatalization of velar consonants before front vowels and initial devoicing.

== Citations and references ==
=== Cited sources ===
- Matras, Yaron (2002). Romani: A Linguistic Introduction. Cambridge University Press. doi:10.1017/CBO9780511486791. ISBN 978-0-521-63165-5.
- Smith, Norval (1994). "An annotated list of creoles, pidgins, and mixed languages". In Arends, Jacque; Muysken, Pieter; Smith, Norval (eds.). Pidgins and Creoles. Creole Language Library. Vol. 15. John Benjamins. pp. 331–374. doi:10.1075/cll.15.34smi. ISBN 978-90-272-5236-4.
