= Nomadic peoples of Europe =

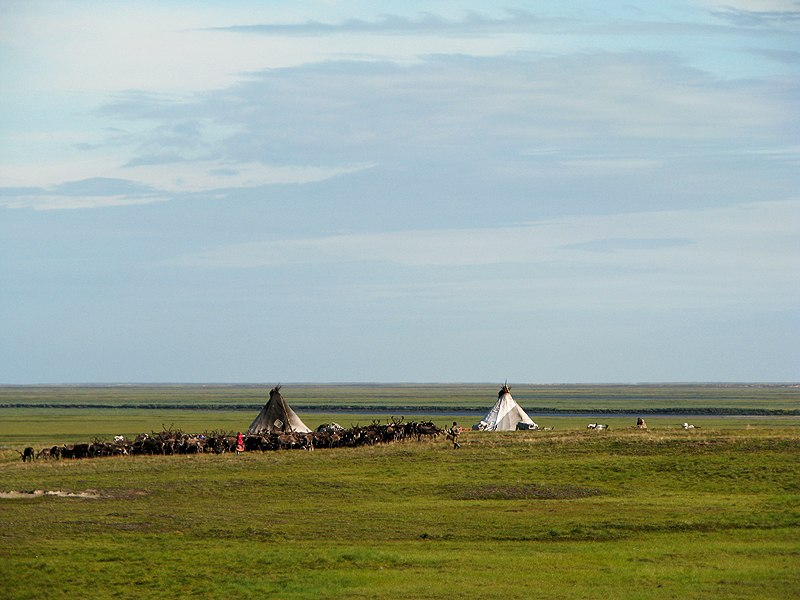
Nenets people in Russia, 2014

Nomadism has rarely been practiced in Europe in the modern period, being restricted to the margins of the continent, notably Arctic peoples such as the (traditionally) semi-nomadic Saami people in the north of Scandinavia, or the Nenets people in Russia's Nenets Autonomous Okrug. In ancient and early medieval times, Eurasian nomads dominated the eastern steppe areas of Europe, such as the Scythians, Huns, Avars, Pechenegs, Cumans or Kalmyk people in Russia's Kalmykia.

Historically, at least until the Early Middle Ages, nomadic groups were much more widespread, especially in the Pontic steppe of Eastern Europe (part of Europe in the contemporary geographical definition, but as part of the Eurasian Steppe historically considered part of Asian Scythia). The last nomadic populations of this region (such as the Kalmyk people, Nogais, Kazakhs and Bashkirs) became mostly sedentary in the Early Modern period under the Russian Empire. Seasonal migration over short distance is known as transhumance (as e.g. in the Alps or Vlachs in the Balkans) and is not normally considered "nomadism".

Sometimes also described as "nomadic" (in the figurative or extended sense) is the itinerant lifestyle of various groups subsisting on craft, trade or seasonal labour rather than on livestock. Romani people and Irish Travellers are the best known of these. See itinerant groups in Europe for those.

== See also ==
- Transhumance
- Vagrancy (people)
- Nomadic tribes in India
- Itinerant groups in Europe
