= Sinte Romani =

Romani variety of Central and Western Europe

- Sintitikes; Manouche
- Romanes, Sinto, Sintitikes
- Native to: Albania, Austria, Bulgaria, Croatia, Czech Republic, France, Germany, Italy, Netherlands, Portugal, Romania, Serbia, Slovenia, Spain, Switzerland, Turkey
- Ethnicity: Sinti
- Native speakers: (210,000 cited 2000–2014)
- Language family: Indo-European: Indo-Iranian; Indo-Aryan; Central Zone; Romani; Northern Romani; Northwestern Romani; Sinte Romani
- Dialects: Abbruzzesi, Eftawagaria, Estracharia, Gadschkene, Kranaria, Krantiki, Lallere, Manouche, Piedmont Sintí
- Writing system: Latin

Official status
- Recognised minority language in: Netherlands; Germany

Language codes
- ISO 639-3: rmo
- Glottolog: sint1235
- ELP: Sinte Romani

Sinte Romani (also known as Sintitikes, Manuš) is the variety of Romani spoken by the Sinti people in Germany, France, Austria, Belgium, the Netherlands, some parts of Northern Italy and other adjacent regions. Sinte Romani is characterized by significant German influence and is not mutually intelligible with other forms of Romani. The language is written in the Latin script.

== Overview ==
The name Romani derives from řom, the historical self-designation of speakers of the Romani language group. Romani is sometimes written as Romany (in English), but native speaking people use the word Romani for the language. Historically, Romani people have been known for being nomadic, but today only a small percentage of Romani people are unsettled due to forced assimilation and government interventions.

Sinte Romani is a dialect of Romani and belongs to the Northwestern Romani dialect group, Sinti is the self-designation of a large Romani population that began leaving the Balkans early on in the dispersion of the Romani language group, from the end of the 14th century on, and migrated to German-speaking territory. Sinti in France typically also speak Sinte Romani but refer to themselves as Manuš (or Manouche). Among French Sinti and Manouche people, its use has been largely superseded by a dialect of French usually known as Voyageur.

Today Sinte is mainly spoken in Germany, France, Northern Italy, Switzerland, Serbia, and Croatia, with smaller numbers of speakers in Austria, the Czech Republic, the Netherlands and Slovenia. Sinti form the largest sub-group of Romani people in Germany, and Germany, in turn, is home to the largest number of Sinte Romani speakers. Nearly all Sinte Romani speakers speak multiple languages, the dominant language of the country they live in being the most common.

== Phonology ==
Sinte Romani is a non-tonal language with 25 consonants, 6 vowels, and 4 diphthongs.

== Vocabulary ==
Example vocabulary for Sinte Romani is given below, based on samples from Austria, Italy, and Albania collected in the Romani Morpho-Syntax Database (RMS) hosted by the University of Manchester. Words that show the influence of historical German vocabulary are marked with an asterisk (*), and words that show the influence of the modern dominant languages (i.e. German, Italian, or Albanian) are marked with a double asterisk (**).

Sinte Romani Vocabulary
		Austria	Italy	Albania
Nouns	Sinti/Roma	sinto	sinti	gipter / sinto
	non-Roma	gadžo	gadžo	xujle
	friend	mal	mal	māl
	father	dad	dat	dād
	grandmother	mami	nonna**	mami
	horse	graj	graj	graj
	dog	džukel / džuklo	džukal	džuklo
	hedgehog	borso	niglo*	niglo*
	fur	hauta*	xauta*	hauta*
	hand	vast	vas	vas
	leg	heri	xeri	pīru
	stomach	buko	stomako**	magaker muj
	heart	zi	zi	zi
	time	ciro	siro	ciro
	weather	wetra*	siro	ciro
	moon	čon	luna**	montu*
	month	enja/čon	monato*	čon
	cabbage	šax	kavolo**	šax
	egg	jāro	jaro	jāro
	butter	khil	kil	butro**
Verbs	speak	rakar-	rakarava	rakr-
	call	khar-	karava	ker- pen
	live	dživ-	vita**	dži-
	love	kam-	kamava	kam-
Adverbs	today	kau dives	kava divas	kaldis
	tomorrow	tajsa	tejsa	tajsa
	yesterday	tajsa	u war divas	vāverdis
	a little	je bisla*	ja pisal*	pisa*
	enough	dosta	doal	doha
Adjective	long	laung**	lungo**	dur

== See also ==
- Sinti
- Romani language
- Manouche

== Sources ==
- Daniel Holzinger, Das Romanes. Grammatik und Diskursanalyse der Sprache der Sinte, Innsbruck 1993
- Norbert Boretzky/Birgit Igla, Kommentierter Dialektatlas des Romani, Teil 1, Wiesbaden: Harrassowitz, 2004
