= Rabbit pie =

Food consisting of rabbit meat in a gravy

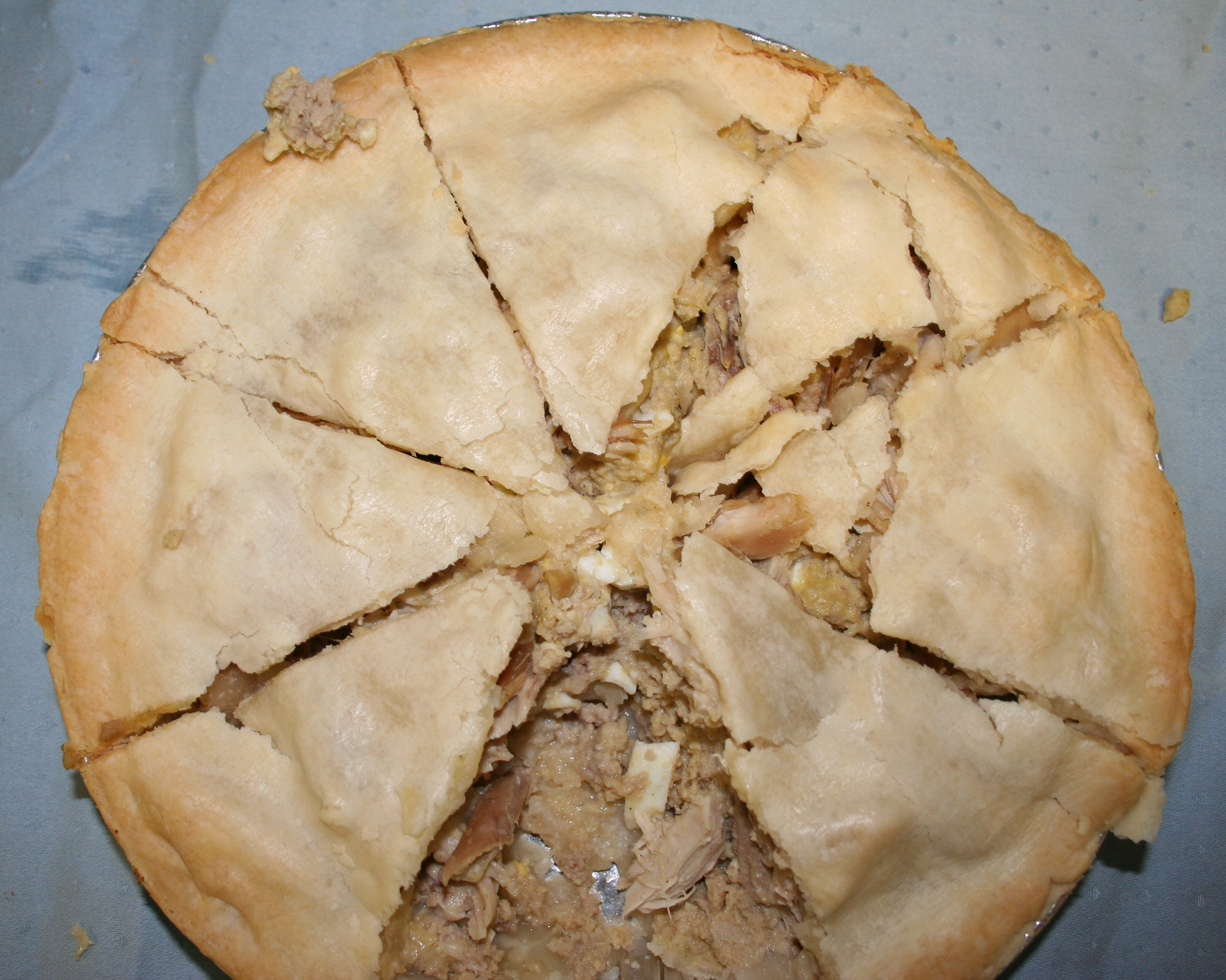
- A meat pie made with rabbit and chicken
- Type: Savoury pie
- Main ingredients: Rabbit, onions, celery and carrots

Rabbit pie is a game pie consisting of rabbit meat in a gravy with other ingredients (typically onions, celery and carrots) enclosed in a pastry case. Rabbit pie is part of traditional American and English cuisine. It has recently found renewed popularity.

== Ingredients ==
Wild rabbit, as opposed to farmed, is most often used as it is easily and affordably obtained, and is described as more flavoursome.

Along with rabbit meat, ingredients of the filling of a rabbit pie typically include onions, celery and carrots. Other ingredients may include prunes, bacon and cider. Australian recipes for rabbit pie sometimes include the food paste Vegemite as an ingredient.

== In culture ==
Rabbit pie was a staple dish of the American pioneers. Thanks to the increasing demand for wild and fresh ingredients, rabbit pie is often seen on the menus of fashionable restaurants and gastropubs.

Two huge rabbit pies are part of traditional Easter celebrations in the English village of Hallaton, Leicestershire.

In Beatrix Potter's children's book The Tale of Peter Rabbit, Peter Rabbit and his siblings are warned "not to go into Mr. McGregor's garden" because their father "had an accident there; he was put in a pie by Mrs. McGregor."

"Rabbit pie day" is ostensibly invoked in the song Run, Rabbit, Run.

It is eaten by the Romani minority.

== See also ==
- Jugged hare
- List of pies, tarts and flans
- Meat pie
