= Northern Romani dialects =

Group of Romani dialects

Northern Romani
- Geographic distribution: Baltic States, Belgium, Czech Republic, England, Finland, France, Germany, Netherlands, Norway, Poland, Scotland, Sweden, Wales
- Linguistic classification: Indo-European: Indo-Iranian; Indo-Aryan; Romani; Northern Romani

Language codes
- Glottolog: roma1330

Northern Romani dialects are a group of dialects of the Romani language spoken in various Northern, North-Western, North-Central and North-Eastern European countries.

The first grammatical outline of the Romani language was done on the Sinti variety.

== Dialects ==
Elšík uses this classification and dialect examples (geographical information from Matras):

Sub-group	Dialect	Place
Kā̊lē	Romnimus (Welsh Romani)	North Wales
Romanichal	Rummaness (Angloromani)	England, Scotland
Kaale	(Kaalengō čib) Finnish Kalo	Finland (only about a thousand speakers)
Northeastern	Lotfitko	Latvia
	Xaladytko	North Russian
	Lešaki	Poland
Sinto-Manuš	Prajstiko	Prussia
	Hameln Sinti	North Germany
	Marburg Sinti	West Germany
	Bohemian Sinti	Czech lands before World War II
	Hungarian Sinti	Hungary
	Westphalian Sinti	Northeastern Germany
	Auvergne Manuš	South Central France
	Piedmontese Sinti	Northwest Italy
	Lombardian Sinti	North Italy
	Venetian Sinti	Northeast Italy
Apennine	Abruzzian	Central Italy
	Calabrian	South Italy
