= Raaduvere =

Village in Estonia

Coordinates: 58°49′N 26°28′E

- Village
- Interactive map of Raaduvere
- Country: Estonia
- County: Jõgeva County
- Parish: Jõgeva Parish
- Time zone: UTC+2 (EET)
  - Summer (DST): UTC+3 (EEST)

Raaduvere is a village in Jõgeva Parish, Jõgeva County in eastern Estonia. A community of Romani also known as Laiuse Roma lived here until World War 2

== See also ==
- Kaevere
