= Scandoromani =

Para-Romani dialect spoken by the Romanisael

- Native to: Norway, Sweden, Denmark
- Native speakers: c. 100–150 (2014); Speakers mostly elderly. More people speak Swedish with some Roma vocabulary.
- Language family: Para-Romani, mixed Romani–Scandinavian

Official status
- Recognised minority language in: Norway (1993); Sweden (1999)

Language codes
- ISO 639-3: Variously: rmg – Traveller Norwegian rmu – Tavringer Romani (Sweden) rmd – Traveller Danish
- Glottolog: trav1236 Norwegian tavr1235 Swedish trav1237 Danish

Scandoromani is a Para-Romani dialect spoken by the Romanisael, a subgroup of the Romani people in Norway (c. 100–150 elderly Scandoromani speakers), and Sweden.

Subforms are referred to as:

- The Norwegian Romani language or Traveller Norwegian (tavringens rakripa, lit. 'Traveller's language'), Norwegian: romani or norsk romani (Norwegian Romani), in Norway (the Romani language of the Norwegian Roma is referred to as romanes in Norwegian);
- The Swedish Romani language or Tavringer Romani, Traveller Swedish or Tattare, Swedish: svensk romani (Swedish Romani), in Sweden;
- Traveller Danish † in Denmark.

Like Angloromani in Britain and Caló in Spain, Scandoromani draws upon a vocabulary of inflected Romani. Much of the original Romani grammar, however, has been lost to the users, and they now communicate in Swedish or Norwegian grammar.

There is no standardised form of Scandoromani, so variations exist in vocabulary, pronunciation, and usage, depending on the speaker. In print, Scandoromani words are often written with Swedish (S) or Norwegian (N) letters (ä, æ, ø, å) and letter combinations to represent Romani sounds, e.g., tj- (/ɕ/) or kj- (/ç/ alt. /tʃ/) to represent the Romani č /tʃ/ and čh /tʃʰ/. Some examples of Scandoromani variant spellings are: tjuro (S) / kjuro (N) 'knife'; gräj (S) / grei (N) 'horse'.

== See also ==
- Finnish Kalo language
- Para-Romani

== Suggested further reading ==
- Baardsen, Gjest (1948). Vandrings- eller skøiersprog; med tillegg av F. L. Hartman og N. Olsen. Ord og sed (in Norwegian). Oslo: Noregs boklag Helge Refsum.
- Dyneley Prince, J. (1925). "The Gypsy Language of Denmark" (PDF). Journal of the American Oriental Society. 45: 97–105. doi:10.2307/593478. JSTOR 593478.
- Baardsen, Gjest. "Samling af de mest forrekommende Ord i det saakaldte Vandrings eller Skøiersprog". Digital Archives. Archived from the original on March 30, 2016.
- Hancock, Ian (1992). "The social and linguistic development of Scandoromani". In Håkon Jahr, Ernst (ed.). Language Contact: Theoretical and Empirical Studies. Trends in Linguistics: Studies and Monographs. Berlin, New York: Mouton de Gruyter. pp. 37–52. ISBN 3-11-012802-0.
- Iversen, Ragnvald (1945). The Rodi (Rotwelsch) in Norway. Secret languages in Norway. Oslo: I Kommisjon Hos Jacob Dybwad.
- Karlsen, Ludvig (1993). Romani-folkets ordbok : [tavringens rakripa : de reisendes språk : romani-norsk-engelsk] (in Traveller Norwegian, Norwegian, and English). Oslo: Pinsevennenes evangeliesenter. ISBN 8299236312.
- Lindell, Lenny [in Swedish]; Thorbjörnsson-Djerf, Kenth (2008). Carling, Gerd (ed.). Ordbok över svensk romani: Resandefolkets språk och sånger (in Swedish). Stockholm: Podium. ISBN 978-91-89196-43-8. A lexicon and grammatical overview of Tavringer Romani; includes several Traveller song texts in extenso.
- Miskow, Johan; Brøndal, Viggo (1923). "Sigøjnersprog i Danmark" (PDF). Danske Studier (in Danish): 97–145.
