= Welsh Romani language =

Variety of the Romani language

Welsh Romani
- Romnimus
- Native to: Wales (United Kingdom)
- Language family: Indo-European: Indo-Iranian; Indo-Aryan; Romani; Northern Romani; British Romani; Welsh Romani

Language codes
- ISO 639-3: rmw
- Glottolog: wels1246

The Welsh Romani language, or Romnimus, is a dialect of the Romani language spoken by the Kale subgroup of the Romani people, who have been present in Wales since the 16th century. Welsh Romani is one of the many Northern Romani dialects.

While most of its vocabulary is of Indo-Aryan origin, there are a significant number of words derived from other languages, such as Greek, Slavic, Persian and Romanian. Welsh loanwords include melanō ("yellow", from melyn), grīga ("heather", from grug) and kraŋka ("crab", from cranc). English loanwords include vlija ("village"), spīdra ("spider") and bråmla ("bramble").

Historically the variants of Welsh Romani and Angloromani (spoken by the Romanichal) constituted the same variant of Romani, known as British Romani. Welsh Romani is closely related to Angloromani, Scandoromani (spoken by Romanisael in Sweden and Norway), Scottish Cant (spoken by Scottish Lowland Romani in Lowland Scotland) and Kalo (Spoken by Kaale in Finland and Sweden). Kale, Romanichal, Romanisael, Kaale and Scottish Lowland Romani are closely related Romani subgroups which stem from the wave of Romani immigrants who arrived in Northern Europe in the 16th century.

== Phonology ==
	Labial		Dental		Alveolar		Post- alveolar		Palatal	Dorsal		Glottal
Nasal		m				n					ŋ	
Stop	p pʰ	b			t tʰ	d	tʃ	dʒ		k kʰ	ɡ	
Fricative	f	v	θ	ð	s	z	ʃ	ʒ		x	ɣ	h
Trill					r̥	r						
Approximant									j	ʍ	w	
Lateral					ɬ	l						

	Front	Central	Back
Close	i		u
Mid	e	ə	o
Open		a	
