= Kale (Welsh Roma) =

Romani subgroup

Kā̊lē (Welsh Romani); Sipsiwn Cymreig (Welsh)
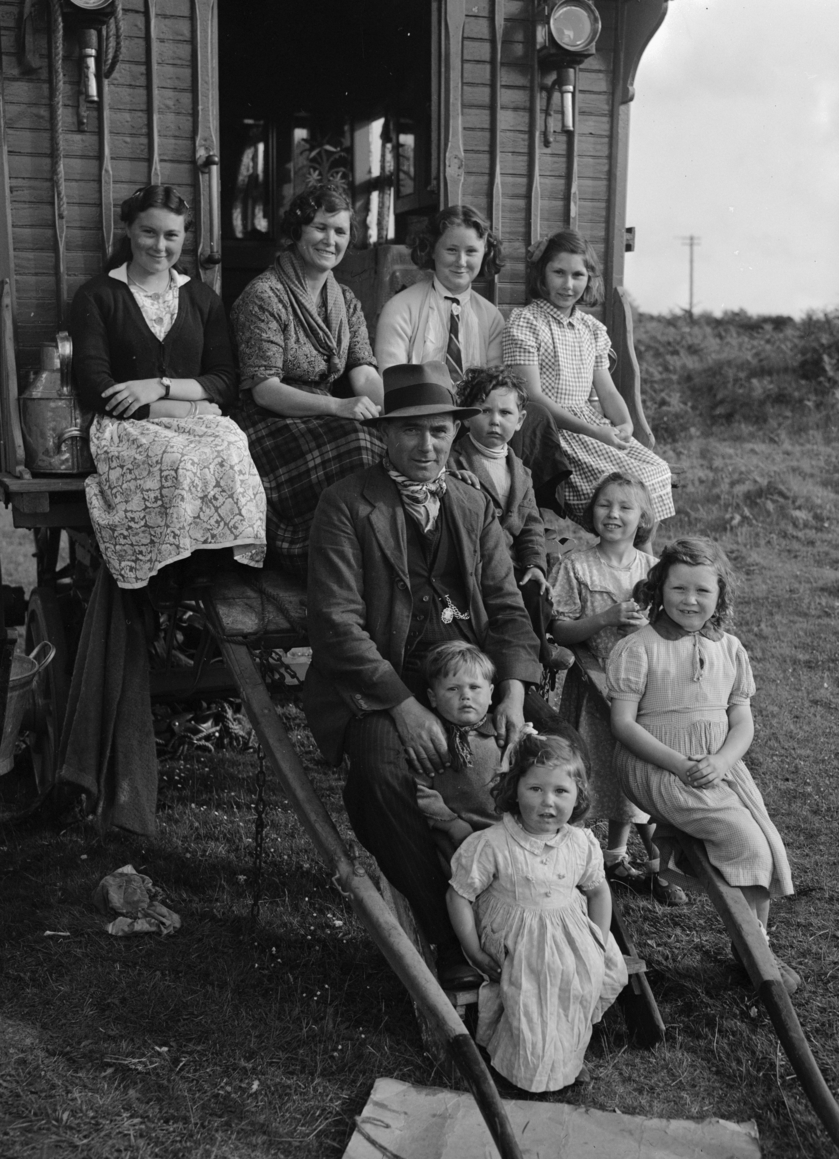
- Kale, taken in Bala, Wales, 1951

Total population
- No reliable data. In Wales, 3,630 identified as Gypsy or Traveller in the 2021 Census.

Regions with significant populations
- North Wales, Mid Wales

Languages
- Welsh Romani language, Welsh, and English

Religion
- Catholicism

Related ethnic groups
- Romanichal, Romanisael, Kaale, Calé, other Romani people

The Kale (also spelled Kalé, or Welsh Gypsies; Welsh Romani: Kā̊lē; Welsh: Sipsiwn Cymreig) are a Romani subgroup predominantly found in Wales, particularly in the Welsh-speaking areas. Romani people have been present in Wales since the 16th century.

The Kale are closely related to the Romanichal, Romanisael, and Kaale subgroups. The Romani people can trace their origins to South Asia, likely in the regions of present-day Punjab, Rajasthan and Sindh.

The Kale were traditionally renowned musicians, and are reported to have introduced the fiddle to Wales. They were also known for their distinctive styles of clothing, dance, poetry and storytelling.

== General ==
Kalo is the Romani word for "black". The Romanis in northwestern Wales use this word as a self-ascription rather than "Rom." Connections to Caló, used for the language spoken by the Calé, and with the Koli clan in Iran remains unclear. Kenrick says,

"Gypsy is not a Gypsy word, and there is no single word for Gypsy in all Romani dialects. Rom (plural Rom or Roma) is a noun meaning “Gypsy,” but not all Gypsies call themselves Roma. The Sinti, Manouche and Kaale in Finland use the word Rom only in the meaning of “husband."

In a glossary, prominent professor Thomas Acton gives "Kalo, Kaalo, Calo plural Kalé, Calé. Black; also used by some Gypsies to mean ‘Gypsy’." Roma has been applied to describe the Gypsies in Wales, notably by Yaron Matras and the Romani Cultural and Arts Project and Lovell's Learn Romani course republished in May 2023 from material dating to the 1990s. It is an umbrella term for the European Union:

The umbrella-term ‘Roma’ encompasses diverse groups, including Roma, Sinti, Kale, Romanichels, Boyash/Rudari, Ashkali, Egyptians, Yenish, Dom, Lom, Rom and Abdal, as well as Traveller populations (gens du voyage, Gypsies, Camminanti, etc.). EU policy documents and discussions commonly employ this terminology.

Kale have been called Gypsies, which originated from people wrongly believing they were from Egypt. This word has origins in the 15th century English term Egyptian and it was used by Shakespeare. The French gitan and Spanish gitano are of the derivation. The first use of Sipsiwn, a Welsh term for Gypsy, is found in a poem by Morris Kyffin at the end of the 16th century.

== Population ==
In the 2021 Census, 0.12% (71,440) of the usual resident population of England and Wales identified as Gypsy or Irish Traveller. Of these, 94.9% (67,815) lived in England and 5.1% (3,630) lived in Wales.

In the early 21st century, most Romanis in Wales lived in houses, though some families continued to travel in caravans. The caravan-dwelling figure in Wales in 2007 included Irish Travellers and descendants of marriages between English and Welsh Gypsies in South Wales. Previously in 1996, there were 489 caravans recorded, 36 of which were on unauthorized encampments (i.e., the roadside).

== History ==
The first reference to Welsh Gypsies is in 1579. Around 1730 Abraham Wood came to Wales and established the Wood family line. Abraham Wood is often credited with introducing the violin to Wales, and many of his descendants became celebrated musicians. Other families who settled in Wales for generations include the Ingrams, along with certain branches of the Price and Lee families. These groups are recognized today as part of the Romani community in Wales.

Within In Gipsy Tents, published in 1894, the very first detailed account of the origins of the Welsh Gypsies was given by John Roberts (b. 1818), a great-grandson of Abram Wood. Francis Hindes Groome, the author, recounts:

But, as it was, here sat John in his glory, lovingly hobnobbing with Silvanus, whose eyes were certainly twinkling, although he had not yet sneezed. They had plunged into endless genealogies, dear to your Gipsy as to any dowager, and had proved their cousinship in at least six different ways. Already John must have run over the four children, twenty grandchildren, fifty-four great-grandchildren, and two hundred and odd great-great-grandchildren of Abraham Wood, the founder of the chief Welsh Romani clan, who "came up into Wales about one hundred and fifty years ago or thereabouts," and was "buried at a lonesome quiet little place by the seaside, on the road from Towyn to Dolgelly, in a church that's not been used for a church as long as I can remember." For when I strolled up, he was speaking of the Ingrams, who "with the Woods were the first as came to Wales. And the first place they took a liking to, on account of rivers and other things, was near Llanidloes, Llanbrynmair, and in the neighbourhood of Machynlleth; and near Aberystwith some of them bought little estates, and others took to travelling. The Ingrams lived near Llanidloes, and the Woods near Llanbrynmair. They were supposed to be in possession of abundance of gold, when taking these places; they were thought gentlefolks of in those days. But my great-grandfather Abraham, and Sarah his wife, still went about from one granza or building to another, for he liked the country so well that he would rather travel it than to stop in one place, after he came to find it out that the people were so kind, and that he liked the country food, rough as it was. They were getting plenty of fishing in those days, and the women would have no occasion to go only to a house or two, until they would be loaded with plenty of beef and bacon and flour and potatoes...

== Language ==
The Kale traditionally spoke Welsh Romani, a dialect of the Romani language also known as Romnimus or the Kåålē dialect.

The Romanichal and Kale spoke differing dialects. By the end of the 19th century, the Romanichal dialect transformed into a mixed language whereas the dialect spoken by the Kale survived until at least the 1950s.

Some English loanwords in Welsh Romani include: yelma ("elm"), glistas- ("to glisten"), hagas ("hag"), masa ("mass"), uglimen ("ugly"), wåntas- ("to want"), určos ("hedgehog"), čimeras- ("to simmer"), ā̊t ("ought"), sekamūra ("sycamore"), lispas- ("to lisp"), slaberīa ("strawberry"), ranǰedō ("rancid") and spīdra ("spider"). Some Welsh loanwords in Welsh Romani include: krīavóla ("rowan") from Welsh criafolen ("rowan"), muŋa ("mane") from Welsh mwng ("mane"), marbólī ("embers") from Welsh marwor ("embers"), halikōn ("hellhound") from Welsh helgyn ("hound"), tišas- ("to sneeze") from Welsh tisio ("to sneeze").

Linguist Yaron Matras classified the dialect as belonging to a branch of the Romani language called British Romani, though it is more generally considered part of the Northern Romani dialects.

=== Extinction ===
Yaron Matras, a prominent Romani linguist, notes:

British Romani, an independent branch, is now considered extinct. The most thorough and extensive description is Sampson’s (1926) monumental grammar of Welsh Romani or the Kåålē dialect, which was still spoken by a number of families until the second half of the twentieth century (cf. Tipler 1957).

Examples are recorded by Derek Tipler in Caernarvonshire in 1957. It went extinct in the 1960s. Manffri Wood, the last known speaker died around 1968.

== Culture ==
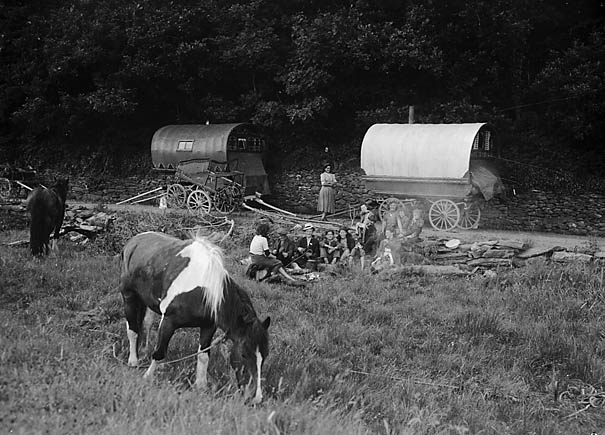
Kale encampment in Swansea (1953)

Kale traditionally participated in regional and national eisteddfodau. John Robert Lewis, the husband of Abram Wood's granddaughter, would win prizes for harping in 1842, 1848, and 1850. Another descendant, John Roberts (1816–1894), earned the sobriquet "Telynor Cymru", and taught his whole family various instruments. His illustrious career culminated in a performance before Queen Victoria at Palé Hall in Llandderfel near Bala on 24 August 1889, on the occasion of the Royal Visit to Wales. John Roberts played with his nine sons, all of them on the harp. Kale preserved the Welsh triple harp in the 19th century, and Nansi Richards, a Kale harpist, was instrumental in its revival in the 20th.

Romanis in Britain often adopted the local surnames when they entered a new area. Each tribe was headed by a sero rom.

== See also ==
- Angloromani
- Gypsy, Roma and Traveller People
- Irish Travellers
- Romanichal
- Scottish Romani and Traveller groups
- Welsh Romani
