= Finnish Romani language =

Variety of the Romani language

Kalo
- kaalengo tšimb
- Native to: Finland, Sweden
- Ethnicity: Finnish Roma
- Native speakers: (10,000 in Finland cited 2001 census); 1,700 in Sweden (2009)
- Language family: Indo-European: Indo-Iranian; Indo-Aryan; Western Indo-Aryan; Romani; Northern Romani; Northwestern Romani; Kalo

Language codes
- ISO 639-3: rmf
- Glottolog: kalo1256

Kalo, Kàlo or the Finnish Romani language (Kalo Finnish Romani: kaalengo tšimb) is a variety of the Romani language spoken by the Kaale subgroup of the Romani people in Finland and Sweden. The language is related to but not mutually intelligible with Scandoromani or Angloromani.

Kalo has 6,000–10,000 speakers and many young people do not know the language. The majority of speakers are from older generations and about two-thirds of the Romani in Finland still speak the language. There have been some revival efforts. Dictionaries and grammar books have been produced and some universities offer Kalo as a course. It has some similarities to the Romani languages in Hungary, where stress is placed on the first syllable of the word. This may be related to the fact that both Finnish and Hungarian words have fixed word-initial stress, a feature that would have diffused to the Romani languages. Kalo has been taught in schools since the late 1980s, with some courses available as early as the 1970s.

== Current situation ==
In 2012 only 30% of the 13,000 Romani in Finland spoke Kalo fluently, but about 50% could understand it. It is now uncommon for Kalo speakers to pass the language to children although there have been efforts made to revive it in recent years. There are language nests in Rovaniemi, and in Helsinki, Romani courses were established. In Finland, the municipalities can establish Romani courses if there is enough demand, though there have been problems due to a lack of resources.

Finnish Romani in Sweden have a right to Kalo and Finnish education.

The number of those speaking the Romani language is estimated to have fallen by almost 40% during the past fifty years.

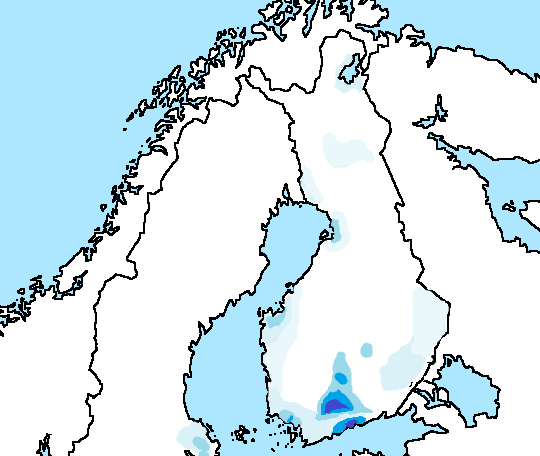
Kalo in Finland

== Phonology ==
	Front				Back	
	unrounded		rounded		Back	
	short	long	short	long	short	long
Close	i	iː	y	yː	u	uː
Mid	e	eː	ø	øː	o	oː
Open	æ	æː			ɑ	ɑː

Finnish Kalo has 8 pairs of long and short vowels. Vowel length can be phonemic as in bur 'through' versus buur 'boor' or allophonic as in baaro/baro 'big'.

Finnish Kalo has 9 closing diphthongs and 3 opening diphthongs.

Diphthongs			Ending point		
Diphthongs			Front		Back
Starting point			Front		Back
Close	Front	unrounded	ie		iu
Close	Front	rounded	yi	yø	
Close	Back		ui		uo
Mid	Front	unrounded	ei		eu
Mid	Front	rounded	øi		
Mid	Back		oi		ou
Open	Front		æi		
Open	Back		ɑi		ɑu

Finnish Kalo has the following consonant phonemes:

		Labial	Dental/ Alveolar	Postalveolar/ Palatal	Velar	Glottal
Nasal		m	n			
Plosive/ Affricate	voiceless	p	t	t̠ʃ	k	
Plosive/ Affricate	voiceless aspirated	pʰ	tʰ		kʰ	
Plosive/ Affricate	voiced	b	d	d̠ʒ	ɡ	
Fricative		f	s		x	h
Approximant		ʋ	l	j		
Trill			r			

== See also ==
- Miranda Vuolasranta
