= Gens du voyage (France) =

Historically marginalized people

The notion of gens du voyage (travelers) is an administrative concept created under French law to designate the community of travellers with no fixed residence, hence referred to as the nomadic community. The notion of "gens du voyage" remains very vague, as it does not avoid the possibility of stigmatization, linked to prejudices about a population that is widely diverse. The term was later taken up by the so-called Besson laws (Law on the reception and housing of Travellers), which organized the reception of Travellers on designated sites in municipalities with more than 5,000 inhabitants. The gens du voyage are French citizens in their own right, working in itinerant trade, construction and landscaping; fairground people are a "category" among them. More often than not, this nomadic lifestyle is the fruit of a family history. Not all are itinerant; some have settled down and others have chosen to return to mobile housing after a period of sedentary living.

The French expression "gens du voyage" should not be confused with:

- Roms (lit. French for Romani people) as defined by the International Romani Union and its various groups (Gitanos, Sinti, Yenish people, etc.), some of whom have settled down, but who are only one component of this group;
- fairground people, or showmen, who are mostly, but not entirely, Roms;
- those whom some French people have confusedly call Roms over the last few decades: economic exiles from Romania, Bulgaria or the countries of the former Yugoslavia, where the vast majority are sedentary, and who are sometimes housed in precarious conditions;
- Irish Travellers, which is often a confusion when translating from one language to another, as these Travellers do not live in continental Europe.

The four main groups of European gens du voyage are: the so-called Oriental Roms, who came from North India in the 13th century and are mainly to be found in Central and Eastern Europe; the Sinti or Manouches, mainly settled in Germany and the large northern half of France; the Gitanos or Kalés, whose presence in the Iberian Peninsula and southern France is attested as far back as the Middle Ages; and the Yenish people, mainly settled in German-speaking and border countries, and also found in the Gard, Ardèche and Massif Central regions.

Described as "voleurs de poules" (lit. French for "chicken thieves") and subject to various forms of discrimination, the gens du voyage have repeatedly seen their freedom to come and go placed under close police surveillance. First with the anthropometric booklet instituted by a law of 1912 on the movement of nomads, then with the "carnets" and "livrets de circulation" (circulation booklets) introduced by the law of January 3, 1969 on "the exercise of itinerant economic activities and the regime applicable to persons moving in France without fixed domicile or residence".

== History ==
From the Middle Ages onwards, many families from different regions of France developed economic activities linked to mobility: peddlers, mercenaries and seasonal workers. Examples include the cagots in southwestern France.

Refugees from Little Egypt, (Note: Little Egypt was the name given to their homeland by the first gypsies to immigrate to Western Europe in the 15th century, a name that did not usually refer to a specific region.) (Note: Consider the singular story of these sedentary Indians, abducted at the beginning of the 11th century, embarked by Turkish nomads in a war of conquest as military slaves, then sedentarized in Anatolia almost fifty years later. Some of them, who settled in the Venetian trading posts and the Byzantine Empire as craftsmen or soldiers towards the end of the 13th century, were forced into exile once again when the Ottomans arrived at the end of the 14th century. The history of this community in Europe dates back to the 15th century. The first travelers were endowed with a certain aura of respectability and nobility. In 1427, hundreds of travelers often presented themselves as pilgrims. They obtained letters of protection from monarchs. In the 15th and 16th centuries, European Roms were protected by princes in Hungary, Bohemia, Poland and France. Public opinion then showed a mixture of tolerance and respectful fear. But little by little, Travellers were denounced as troublemakers, "abusers of people". Those who arrived in Germany, Italy and France (Sinti/Manus) were forced, from expulsion to expulsion, to find subsistence strategies through itinerancy. The fate of their brothers in the Balkans (Roms) and on the Iberian Peninsula (Gitanos) was very different, and most of them are sedentary. Roms and Kalés are therefore not "gens du voyage".) who arrived in France in the early 15th century, also adopted this lifestyle out of economic necessity. At first, they worked as war contractors for the great feudal lords. Then, following Louis XIV's ban on private warfare and the King's Declaration against the Bohemians in 1682, which sent them to the galleys and forced them to hide and move around, they found new employment in seasonal services and itinerant trade.

At the end of the 1870 war, many Yenish from Alsace opted for France and joined the mass of families living a life structured around itinerancy. In the 19th century, nomadic populations, now known as "gens du voyage", included families of diverse origins: Manouches, Yenish, but also French peasants living on the road.

At the end of the 19th century, they were referred to exclusively as bohemians, but several administrative and legal steps led to their definition as pariahs, notably the 1895 census of "all nomads, bohemians and wanderers", followed by the July 16, 1912 law "on the exercise of itinerant professions and the circulation of nomads". Under this law, Travellers (both children and adults) were subject to controls through the presentation of their "anthropometric identity booklets", on which, in addition to photographs (face and profile), fingerprints and even vaccination records appeared. Worse still, on April 6, 1940, the French government issued a decree banning the circulation of "nomads" throughout metropolitan France and placing them under assigned residence; the decree was not lifted until July 1946. Under pressure from Nazi Germany, Vichy France created nomad camps where travellers, Romani people, gypsies and similar, were interned in harsh conditions until 1946.

== French legislation ==
=== The law of January 3, 1969 and the circulation booklet ===
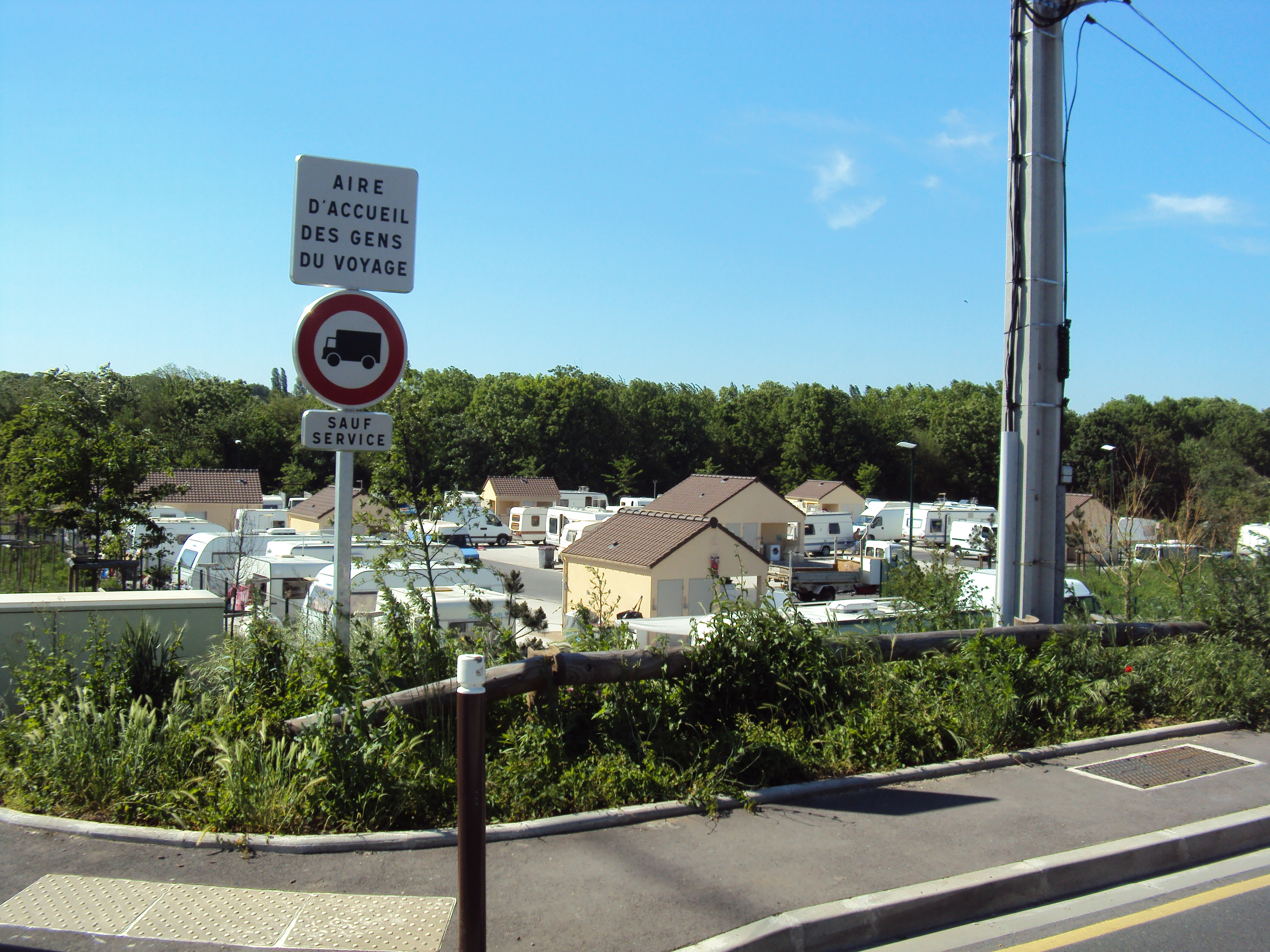
A reception area for travellers at Saint-Ouen-l'Aumône.

Prior to January 2017, non-sedentary French citizens were required to hold a circulation permit in order to move freely within France. Describing this administrative document as an "internal passport" and the law of January 3, 1969 which instituted it as an "apartheid law", Olivier Le Mailloux, a lawyer representing a travelling showman holding a livret de circulation, referred the matter to the French Constitutional Council. "Even though they are French, travellers still have to report regularly to the police station or gendarmerie," said the lawyer. The law of January 3, 1969 concerned people with no fixed domicile or residence of more than six months in a member state of the European Union.

In its decision, handed down on October 5, 2012, the Constitutional Council followed his analysis, declaring the carnet de circulation contrary to the Constitution on the grounds that this travel document "disproportionately impaired the exercise of the freedom to come and go" and "unjustifiably restricted the exercise of civic rights". However, the Constitutional Court upheld the legislator's requirement for itinerant people to hold a "livret de circulation", which was less coercive than the "carnet de circulation".

The abolition of carnets de circulation by the Égalité et Citoyenneté law of January 27, 2017 was hailed as a step forward by the French Rights Defender, notably in his report on gens du voyage "Lever les entraves au droit" (lifting barriers to the law) (oct 2021).

Olivier Le Mailloux continued the legal battle on behalf of the "Gens du voyage" associations he was defending before the Conseil d'Etat, arguing that the "livrets de circulation" were contrary to the European Convention on Human Rights.

The Conseil d'Etat partially agreed with him, declaring the sanctions applicable to all those who did not hold a travel permit or who could not justify possession before the forces of law and order to be contrary to the European Convention on Human Rights.

On October 28, 2016 in Montreuil-Bellay, the French President acknowledged France's responsibility for the internment of gens du voyage during World War II and inaugurated a memorial to the victims.

On December 22, 2016, the French National Assembly definitively adopted the law on equality and citizenship, which repeals the law of January 3, 1969, thus putting an end to travelers' carnets de circulation and the commune of attachment. The matter was referred to the French Constitutional Council. The law was promulgated on January 27, 2017.

=== The Besson laws ===
The 1st "Besson" law of May 31, 1990 required towns with a population of over 5,000 to provide sites for nomads, which led to complex situations for towns close to this limit. The second "Besson" law, Law no. 2000-614 of July 5, 2000, further defined the rules.

In March 2003, the law on internal security increased the penalties for illegal land occupation (six months' imprisonment and a 3,750 euro fine, seizure of motor vehicles and suspension of driving license). The November 7, 2018 law increased the penalties incurred to one year's imprisonment and a 7,500-euro fine.

In November 2005, the French National Assembly passed the 2006 Finance Act making people living in mobile homes liable to property tax. The tax was reviewed in 2010 and definitively repealed in 2019.

In 2018, following a bill, a new text modified the current rules in three areas: it clarified the role of the State, local authorities and their groupings, modified procedures for evacuating illegal parking sites, and strengthened criminal penalties.

=== La Commission nationale consultative des gens du voyage (CNCGDV) ===
Created and set up in December 2015, under the mandate of Sylvia Pinel, Minister of Housing, Territorial Equality and Rurality, the Commission nationale consultative des gens du voyage (CNCGDV), aims to adapt public policy to the reception, housing, support and culture of gens du voyage. It is part of a renewed inter-ministerial strategy concerning the situation of gens du voyage, following on from the reflections and proposals of Prefect Hubert Derache. The Commission was set up by the Dihal (interministerial delegation for housing and access to housing for homeless or poorly housed people).

== Living conditions ==
=== Permanent reception areas ===
The second Besson law of July 5, 2000 required towns of over 5,000 inhabitants to build and provide permanent halting sites for gens du voyage. These sites, equipped with individual sanitary facilities, as well as water and electricity supply points, involved a high development cost of around 75,000 euros per site (plus maintenance costs), which was assumed by the Departmental Councils, the State, urban communities and/or communes, depending on the case. However, many car parks were operated under public-private partnerships, i.e. delegated to companies. These companies, often specialized in this field, produced substantial sales figures.

In some departments, use of the sites could be free of charge (e.g. Côtes-d'Armor). Elsewhere, a parking fee may be charged for each space, ranging from one to ten euros per day per family.

As of July 17, 2013, only 52% of the sites planned in 2000 had been built (less than 30% for large-scale sites). Most of the reception areas actually built were far from city centers, inaccessible by public transport, or located in potentially dangerous industrial zones, such as the Rouen-Petit Quevilly site just a few meters from the Lubrizol plant, classified as SEVESO high threshold, which suffered a major fire on September 26, 2019. On this point, the FNASAT (Loris Granal and Gaëlla Loiseau) study on the location of public accommodation and housing for gens du voyage provided essential elements of knowledge and analysis.

== Bibliography ==
- Review collection Études tsiganes [Gypsy studies] (in French) edited by the FNASAT www.fnasat.asso.fr
- Merchat, Daniel, Accueil et stationnement des gens du voyage [Reception and parking of travelers] (in French), Éditions Le Moniteur, Paris, 2001
- Aubin, Emmanuel, La Commune et les gens du voyage [The commune and travelers] (in French), Éditions Berger-Levrault, Paris, 2003.
- DENYONS. H (2012). Les gens du voyages boudent l'école [Travellers stay away from school] (in French).
- DERACHE. H (2013). Appui à la définition d'une stratégie interministérielle renouvelée concernant la situation des gens du voyage [Support for the definition of a renewed interministerial strategy on the situation of Travellers] (in French).
- Les défenseurs des droits (2013). Gens du voyage [Travelers] (in French).
- MARTIN. L (2012). Les représentations des enseignants sur les enfants du voyages : quel impact sur la scolarisation de ce public ? [Teachers' representations of Travellers' children: what impact on the schooling of this group?] (in French).
- Sénat (2016). Accueil des gens du voyage et scolarisation des enfants [Home for Travellers and schooling for children] (in French).
- NOVIC.J (2009). L'école du voyage. Injam production. 52-minute documentary.
- CREYSSELS, M. (2008). « Technologie nomade pour enfants nomades » [Nomadic technology for nomadic children], Monde de l'éducation, No. 370, pp. –62-63 (in French)
- NEYROUD, P. (2006). « Quels bagages pour les enfants du voyage ? » [What luggage for the travelling children?], L'École des parents, No. 560, p. 54 (in French).
