= Angloromani =

Para-Romani dialect spoken by the Romanichal

- Pogadi Chib
- Native to: United Kingdom
- Region: English-speaking world
- Ethnicity: Romanichal
- Language family: Mixed Romani–English

Language codes
- ISO 639-3: rme
- Glottolog: angl1239

Angloromani or Anglo-Romani (also known as Angloromany, Rummaness, or Pogadi Chib) is a Para-Romani dialect spoken by the Romanichal, a subgroup of the Romani people in the United Kingdom and other parts of the English-speaking world. It is characterised by the presence of Romani vocabulary and syntax in the English used by Romanichal.

Romanichal used the Romani language from their arrival in the 16th century up until the late 19th century, when it was replaced, for the most part, by English as their everyday and family language. This resulted in the formation of Angloromani.

This differs from the presence of loanwords (such as that used locally in Edinburgh and Northumberland) from the Romani language, such as lollipop (originally a toffee apple), pal (originally Romani phral 'brother'), and chav (originally ćhavo 'boy').

== Documentation ==
A document from about the 17th century titled the Winchester Confessions indicates that the English Romani language was itself a dialect of the northern branch of Romani sharing a close similarity to the Welsh Romani language. However, the language in a modern context has changed from the Indic-based vocabulary, morphology, and influences from Greek and other Balkan languages of the 17th century to a Para-Romani dialect typical of modern Anglo-Romani with sentence endings influenced by English, while Welsh Romani retains the original grammatical system.

Historically, the variants of Welsh and English Romani constituted the same variant of Romani, share characteristics, and are historically closely related to dialects spoken in France, Germany (Sinti), Scandinavia, Spain, Poland, North Russia and the Baltic states. Such dialects are descended from the first wave of Romani immigrants into western, northern and southern Europe in the late Middle Ages. Few documents survive into modern times, the Winchester Confessions document c.1616 highlights the variant of English Romani and contains a high number of words still used in the modern Northern European Romani dialects and until recently also Welsh Romani; Examples include: balovas (pig meat bacon), lovina (beer, alcohol), ruk (tree), smentena (cream), boba (beans) and folaso (glove), and all such words occur in all western dialects of Romani, with few English loanwords present.

However, the Winchester Confessions document indicates that English grammatical structures were influencing speakers of English Romani (within a London context where the document was sourced) to adopt an (adjective-noun) configuration rather than the (noun-adjective) configuration of other Romani dialects, including modern Welsh Romani. The document suggests a complete separation between Thieves' Cant, and the variant of English Romani of the early 17th century. This has particular implications when dating the origin and development of Anglo-Romani and its split from Welsh Romani. The author of one such study believes English Romani gradually lost its distinctive syntax, phonology and morphology while other scholars believe Anglo-Romani developed relatively quickly after the Romanis' arrival in England in the 16th century, in a development similar to the Pidgin or Creole languages.

Anglo-Romani was already developing in the 17th century although the change from the original English Romani is unclear. The Winchester Confessions document disproves a sudden morphological change, and lends support to a strict linguistic separation between a Canting language and English Romani whose speakers used a separate and distinct Romani language when speaking amongst themselves. A situation which existed one hundred years later as testified by James Poulter 1775: "the English Gypsies spoke a variant of their own language that none other could understand," indicating the language was distinct from the common "Canting tongue" of England. Romani of that time was a language of everyday communication, of practical use, and not a secret language.

The origins of the Romani language are in India, and the core of the vocabulary and grammar still resemble modern Indic languages like Hindi, Kashmiri, and Punjabi. Linguists have been investigating the dialects of Romani since the second half of the 18th century, and although there are no ancient written records of the language, it has been possible to reconstruct the development of Romani from the medieval languages of India to its present forms as spoken in Europe. Although the language remains similar at its core, it is sometimes quite difficult for Romani people from different regions to understand one another if they have not had any exposure to other dialects before.

== Intertwining ==
Anglo-Romani is a mixed language, with the base languages being Romani and English (something referred to as Para-Romani in Romani linguistics). Alternatively, it has also been classified as a creole language, but many linguists reject this nowadays, arguing that the circumstances of its origin as well as the structural make-up of the language militate against such a classification.

Some English lexical items that are archaic or only used in idiomatic expressions in Standard English survive in Anglo-Romani, for example moniker and swaddling.

Every region where Angloromani is spoken is characterised by a distinct colloquial English style; this often leads outsiders to believe that the speech of Romanichals is regional English. The distinct rhotic pronunciation of the Southern Angloromani variety also means that many outsiders perceive Southern Romanichal Travellers to be from the West Country because West Country English is also rhotic. Indeed, many Romanichal Travellers from the South of England or the Midlands region have a slightly West Country sounding accent; in fact it is a Southern Romanichal Traveller accent.

== Dialects ==
Among Anglo-Romani speakers, there is variation depending on where groups originally settled before learning English:

- Southern Angloromani (Spoken across the Southwest, Southeast, East Anglia, West Midlands, East Midlands and South Wales).
- Northern Angloramani (Spoken across the Northwest, Northeast, Yorkshire, Northeast Wales and Scottish Borders).

The members of these groups consider that not only do their dialects/accents differ, but also that they are of different regional groups. The speakers of Southern Angloromani took the regional identity of Southern Romanichal Travellers and the speakers of Northern Angloromani took the regional identity of Northern Romanichal Travellers. At the time of settlement, these divisions were somewhat reflective of geographic location. They did travel, but until travel became modernized, the migrations were relatively local.

== Phonology ==
Overall, Anglo-Romani consonants reflect the Standard Southern British consonantal system with the exception that the rhotic is trilled [r] and /x/ appears in certain dialects. Anglo-Romani may sometimes be rhotic and in other cases is non-rhotic like English non-rhotic dialects; for example, in Romani terno "young" (passing through the stage tarno) can be rendered as tawno.

== Morphology ==
In the 16th century, the Romani language was an inflected language, employing two genders, plurality and case marking.

Anglo-Romani is first referenced in 1566–1567.

In the late 19th century, Romani personal pronouns became inconsistently marked, according to Leland, who also notes that case distinction began fading overall, and gender marking also disappeared. George Borrow notes that in 1874, some Romani speakers were still employing complete inflection, while some were adopting the English syntax with a Romani lexicon. It seems to be around 1876 that gender distinction was no longer seen; however, the continued use of Romani plural forms was noted, along with English verb conjugation. By 1923, some plural endings were still being used on nouns, but English prepositions were used instead of Romani postpositions. Current usage has lost almost all Romani morphology and instead uses English morphology with Romani lexical items.

== Syntax ==
Romani allowed for two word orders – Subject-Verb-Object (SVO) and Verb-Subject-Object (VSO).

Negation in Anglo-Romani is achieved through the use of the word kek:

- măndī can kek ker lĭs ('I can't do it')
- there's kekə pani left in kŭvə kurī ('there's no water left in this bucket')

"Be" is optionally deleted:

- tūte kūšta diken muš ('you are a fine-looking man')
- tūte rinkna râne ('you are a pretty lady')

Reduplication is employed for emphasis:

- dūvrī ('distant')
- dūvrī-dūvrī ('very distant')

== Samples ==
The Anglo-Romani Project, an initiative of the Romani community of Blackburn and the Lancashire Traveller Education Service, has samples of Anglo-Romani conversation as well as documentation, which it has collected with the aim of documenting the Anglo-Romani lexicon in its regional and dialectal variation. Samples of conversation and their meaning can be found on their website. A dictionary of Anglo-Romani words and their etymology can be found on the Romani Project website.

=== Some common phrases ===
An example of a phrase in Angloromani is The mush was jalling down the drom with his gry ('The man was walking down the road with his horse').

Kushti divvus	Hello (literally 'Good day')
Sashin?	How are you?
Mandi adusta kushti	I am very well.
Owli, mandi kushti	Yes, I'm fine, too.
Tutti rokker Rummaness?	Do you speak Romani?
Katar kai tutti jells?	Where are you from?
Mandi poshrat	I'm half Romani.
Mandi tatchi rummani	I'm full Romani.
Adusta salla jan tutti	Pleased to meet you.
Dik tutti kullika divvus	See you tomorrow.
So tutti's nav?	What's your name?
Mandi's nav Maria	My name is Maria.
Owli	Yes.
Kek	No.

=== Comparison of Angloromani, European Romani, Indic languages and English ===
Angloromani	European Romani	English	Indic languages	Slang English
chav	ćhavo	child, son, boy (all specifically used for Romani and not non-Romani)	bacha (relatively recent Persian borrowing)	chav 'a rough youth' (deriving from a derogatory usage of the word chav to refer to a Romani boy)
lollipobbul	laliphabai	toffee apple (or 'red apple')	lal seb (seb is a fairly recent Persian borrowing into Indic languages)	lollipop
gavver	gavengro	policeman (or villager)	gavāṇḍhī (Punjabi)	
jib	ćhib	language, tongue	jībh (Punjabi)	

=== Swadesh list ===
No.	English	Angloromani Romanes
1	I	me
2	you (singular)	tu
3	he	of
4	we	amen
5	you (plural)	tumen
6	they	on
7	this	ada
8	that	oda
9	here	ade
10	there	ode
11	who	ko
12	what	so
13	where	kaj
14	when	kana
15	how	sar
16	not	na/nane
17	all	sa
18	many	keci
19	some	varesave
20	few	cikra
21	other	
22	one	jek
23	two	duj
24	three	trin
25	four	star
26	five	panj
27	big	baro/bare
28	long	
29	wide	
30	thick	
31	heavy	
32	small	cikno
33	short	cikno
34	narrow	
35	thin	
36	woman	romni
37	man (adult male)	murs
38	man (human being)	rom/romni
39	child	cave
40	wife	
41	husband	
42	mother	mama
43	father	oco
44	animal	
45	fish	
46	bird	chirikle
47	dog	
48	louse	
49	snake	
50	worm	
51	tree	
52	forest	
53	stick	
54	fruit	
55	seed	
56	leaf	
57	root	
58	bark (of a tree)	
59	flower	
60	grass	
61	rope	
62	skin	
63	meat	mas
64	blood	rat
65	bone	
66	fat (noun)	
67	egg	
68	horn	
69	tail	
70	feather	
71	hair	shero/bala
72	head	shero
73	ear	kana
74	eye	yaka
75	nose	nak
76	mouth	muj
77	tooth	
78	tongue (organ)	cib
79	fingernail	
80	foot	
81	leg	
82	knee	
83	hand	vasta
84	wing	
85	belly	
86	guts	
87	neck	
88	back	dumo
89	breast	
90	heart	
91	liver	
92	to drink	
93	to eat	
94	to bite	
95	to suck	
96	to spit	
97	to vomit	
98	to blow	
99	to breathe	
100	to laugh	te asal
101	to see	te dikel
102	to hear	te sunel
103	to know	te dzanel
104	to think	te mislinel
105	to smell	
106	to fear	
107	to sleep	te sovel
108	to live	te dzivel
109	to die	te merel
110	to kill	te murdarel
111	to fight	te marel
112	to hunt	
113	to hit	
114	to cut	
115	to split	
116	to stab	
117	to scratch	
118	to dig	
119	to swim	
120	to fly	
121	to walk	
122	to come	te dzal
123	to lie (as in a bed)	
124	to sit	te besel tele
125	to stand	
126	to turn (intransitive)	
127	to fall	
128	to give	te del
129	to hold	
130	to squeeze	
131	to rub	
132	to wash	te tovel
133	to wipe	
134	to pull	
135	to push	
136	to throw	
137	to tie	
138	to sew	
139	to count	
140	to say	te penel
141	to sing	te dzijavel
142	to play	te bajinel
143	to float	
144	to flow	
145	to freeze	
146	to swell	
147	sun	
148	moon	
149	star	
150	water	
151	rain	
152	river	
153	lake	
154	sea	
155	salt	lon
156	stone	bar
157	sand	
158	dust	
159	earth	
160	cloud	
161	fog	
162	sky	
163	wind	
164	snow	
165	ice	
166	smoke	
167	fire	
168	ash	
169	to burn	
170	road	drom
171	mountain	
172	red	lolo/cerveno
173	green	
174	yellow	
175	white	parno
176	black	kalo
177	night	raci
178	day	dives
179	year	besh
180	warm	tato
181	cold	shil
182	full	calo
183	new	nevo
184	old	puro
185	good	laco
186	bad	nalaco
187	rotten	
188	dirty	
189	straight	
190	round	
191	sharp (as a knife)	
192	dull (as a knife)	
193	smooth	
194	wet	panalo
195	dry	
196	correct	pravo/caco
197	near	pase
198	far	dur
199	right	pravo
200	left	levo
201	at	
202	in	andro/andre
203	with	
204	and	a
205	if	
206	because	lebo
207	name	lav/nav

== See also ==
- Polari
