= Alberts Eichelis =

Latvian police officer, former Canadian citizen, convicted World War II war criminal

- Born: Alberts Yanovich Eichelis; 1912; Cēsis county, Russian Empire
- Died: 1984 (aged 71–72); West Germany
- Other names: Albert Eichelis; Albert Eihelis; Alberts Eihelis; Albert Yanovich Eichelis
- Known for: Nazi collaborator; directing Latvians to commit mass murders in Maltā and the Audrini massacre, during World War II
- Police career
- Country: Latvia
- Allegiance: Nazi Germany
- Department: District of Rēzekne
- Branch: Militia police
- Rank: Police chief of Rēzekne (August 26, 1941—c. 1943)
- Criminal information
- Motive: Antisemitism; Fascism
- Convictions: 1. Murder (in absentia) (1965); 2. Murder (1984)
- Penalty: 1. Death (1965); 2. 6 years imprisonment (1984)
- Accomplices: Boļeslavs Maikovskis; Haralds Puntulis; Heinrich Himmler; anor
- Escaped: To West Germany in 1948
- Comments: 1. Tried in absentia by the Latvian Soviet Socialist Republic (1965); 2. Tried in person by West Germany (1984)

Details
- Span of crimes: 1941–1943
- Country: Latvia
- Locations: Maltā and Audrini, Rēzekne, Rositten
- Targets: Latvian Jews, gypsies, and communists
- Killed: 1. 750 people (1965); 2. 170 people (1984)

Alberts Eichelis (Note: Also known as Albert Eichelis, Albert Eihelis, Alberts Eihelis, Albert Yanovich Eichelis, and other variations.) (1912–1984) was a Latvian police officer and Nazi collaborator.

In World War II Eichelis served as the chief of police in the Rēzekne district during the German occupation of Latvia. Eichelis directed the execution of Latvian Jews, gypsies, and communists. After the war, Eichelis escaped to West Germany and requests to extradite him to the Soviet Union to face criminal charges were refused. He was tried in absentia, was convicted of murder, and sentenced to death in 1965. (Note: The FBI note reads: "Those given the death sentence in absentia were Boleslavs Maikovskis, now living in Mineola, L.I.; Harold Puntilis (sic.) of Willowdale, Ont., Canada, and Albert (sic.) Eichelis of Karlsruhe, West Germany… All the accused were former Latvian police officials.)

At a second trial where Eichelis appeared in person, held in West Germany in 1984, it was found that he had been an accomplice of the Schutzstaffel forces that led to the execution of 170 residents of the town of Rositten, most of whom were women and children.

== Biography ==
Alberts Yanovich Eichelis was born in 1912 in the Cēsis county, Rozula parish of the Russian Empire, now modern-day Latvia. He was married and, after WWII, moved to Karlsruhe, near Klamveg, in the Federal German Republic (West Germany). It is believed that Eichelis died shortly after his 1984 sentence to six-years' imprisonment.

Serving as the Chief of the Militia Police of the District of Rēzekne, Eichelis was in command of fellow Latvians, Haralds Puntulis and Boļeslavs Maikovskis. Eichelis instructed Puntulis and Maikovskis and others to carry out mass murders in Maltā and the Audrini massacre, executing the entire population of the village, including the public execution of 30 villagers in the public square of Rēzekne. (Note: The FBI note reads: "He [Puntilis] was the stooge of Alberts Eihelis, Chief of the Militia Police of the District of Rezekne, and… he was also the leader of a special firing squad… The public murder of the 30 Audrinites on the market place in Rezekne was done by the Puntulis-led firing squad. In July 1941, thus very soon after the Hitler invasion, Puntulis and his firing squad killed, in the forest of Balda, all of the Jewish inhabitants of the village of Silmala. Shortly afterwards, the brutes invaded the village of Riebini. Puntulis gave us instructions for the forthcoming action, testified [another co-]accused J. Basankovics; 'He said that all Jews living in Riebini would be shot'. Very soon, several hundreds of unfortunate men, women, and children were taken to the forest and shot. After that, in the pastor's residence in Riebini, there took place a drinking party, 'in honor of the completed action', where [co-accused] Basankovics saw Puntulis and other leading police functionaries.)

=== 1965 trial, Latvia ===
In 1965, the Latvian Soviet Socialist Republic conducted a show trial held between October 12 and October 30 in the Supreme Court in Riga. Six men, all former Latvian police officials, were accused of the murder of the 15,000 people, including 2,000 children, in mass executions in the Rēzekne district when it was under German occupation between 1941 and 1943. Appearing in person were Latvians, Jasep Basankovic, Janis Krasovskis and Peteris Vaiciuks; and tried in absentia were Eichelis, Puntulis, and Maikovskis.

Eichelis, Puntulis, and Maikovskis left Latvia after WWII: Eichelis emigrated to West Germany; Puntulis to Canada in 1948; and Maikovskis, declared a displaced person, to the United States in 1951. In 1965, the USSR requested Eichelis, Puntulis, and Maikovskis be extradited to the Latvian Soviet Socialist Republic to face war crime charges. The West German, Canadian and U.S. governments refused. (Note: The FBI note reads: "Laiks, a anti-Communist Latvian language newspaper, published in Brooklyn, New York, Volume 17, Number 48.(1574), dated June 16, 1965, contains an article on Page 5, Column 4 entitled, "A New Soviet ..attack." This article refers to a Tass report informing that the Soviet Government has requested extradition of three Latvian nationals accused of war crimes during the German occupation of Latvia. The alleged "war criminals" are Boleslavs Maikovskis of Mineola, Long Island, New York, Harolds Puntulis of Toronto, and Eichels in Karlsmuke, West Germany. The Tass report informs that the extradition requests have been submitted to the American, Canadian, and West Germany Embassies in Moscow.")

Evidence was tendered at his trial that Eichelis directed Puntulis and Maikovskis to carry out the public execution of 30 villagers in the public square of Rēzekne. Witnesses claimed that the village of Audrini was burned to the ground and the possessions of the former inhabitants destroyed. At the trial, it was found that Eichelis had ordered that "…not one Jew must remain alive in Rēzekne…"; and directed others to carry out his commands. Eichelis was convicted of the murder of 750 people who were Latvian Jews, gypsies, and communists.

Puntulis and Maikovskis were also convicted of murder and sentenced to death, in absentia. Like Eichelis, Puntulis and Maikovskis both avoided the death penalty. Puntulis died of natural causes in Toronto, aged 73 years. Facing persecution and deportation due to making fraudulent claims on his 1951 U.S. visa application, Maikovskis fled to West Germany in 1987 where he faced additional murder charges. However, the charges were dropped due to his ill heath, and Maikovskis died of natural causes in Münster, aged 92 years.

Basankovic and Krasovskis were convicted of murder and sentenced to death. Vaiciuks was convicted and sentenced to 15-years' imprisonment.

=== 1984 trial, West Germany ===
In 1980 Eichelis faced further charges of murder and conspiracy in the mass execution of 270 men, women and children near the town of Rositten, including the execution of 170 residents of the village of Odrini in January 1942 and the execution of 100 Jews in September or October, 1941. Puntulis, still living in Canada, was required to give a signed deposition on Eichelis' actions, for use in the second trial.

In written statements before and during the trial, held in West Germany, Eichelis vehemently denied involvement in the murders, claiming that they were either carried out by German officials or he was not aware that they occurred.

In 1984 and 1985, it was reported that Eichelis was sentenced in a Landau court to six-years' imprisonment following his conviction of involvement in the killing of 170 civilians in Latvia in 1942.

== See also ==
- Ratlines (World War II)
- The Holocaust in Latvia
- Romani Holocaust
