= Haralds Puntulis =

Latvian police officer, former Canadian citizen, convicted World War II war criminal

- Puntulis in 1940
- Born: Haralds Petrovich Puntulis or Horald Petrovich Puntulis; 14 May 1909; Yaroslav, Latvia
- Died: 4 July 1982 (aged 73); Toronto, Canada
- Other name: Harry Puntulis
- Known for: Nazi collaborator; leading a firing squad that carried out mass murders in Maltā and the Audrini massacre, during World War II
- Spouse: Anna Puntulis
- Police career
- Country: Latvia
- Allegiance: Nazi Germany
- Department: District of Rezekne
- Branch: Militia police
- Rank: Platoon commander; Head of the 4th Police Precinct (July 27, 1941—May 20, 1944)
- Awards: Iron Cross (2nd class)
- Other work: Building contractor (Canada)
- Criminal information
- Motive: Antisemitism; Fascism
- Conviction: Murder (in absentia)
- Penalty: Death
- Accomplices: Alberts Eichelis; Boļeslavs Maikovskis; anor
- Escaped: To Canada in 1948
- Comments: Tried in absentia by the Latvian Soviet Socialist Republic (1965) (Note: Sources vary on the date of the trial, with some claiming it was held during October 1965; and other sources claim that the trial was held in 1982. However, reference to the 1982 date is most likely the date of the TODAY Magazine exposé, or the date of Puntulis' death.)

Details
- Span of crimes: August 1941 – January 4, 1942
- Country: Latvia
- Locations: Maltā and Audrini, Rēzekne
- Targets: Latvian Jews, gypsies, and communists
- Killed: 750 people

Haralds Puntulis (14 May 1909 – 4 July 1982), known locally in Canada as Harry Puntulis, was a Latvian police officer and Nazi collaborator.

In World War II Puntulis served as the chief of the 4th Maltā police precinct during the German occupation of Latvia. Puntulis directed the execution of Latvian Jews, gypsies, and communists, and was awarded the Iron Cross for service to the Reichskommissariat Ostland. After the war, Puntulis escaped to Canada and requests to extradite him to the Soviet Union to face criminal charges were refused by the Canadian government. He was tried in absentia, was convicted of murder, and sentenced to death. (Note: The FBI note reads: "Those given the death sentence in absentia were Boleslavs Maikovskis, now living in Mineola, L.I.; Harold Puntilis (sic.) of Willowdale, Ont., Canada, and Albert Eichelis of Karlsruhe, West Germany… All the accused were former Latvian police officials.)

A retired building contractor, Puntulis died of natural causes in Toronto, aged 73 years, 17 years after being sentenced to death.

== Biography ==
Haralds Petrovich Puntulis (or Horald Petrovich Puntulis) was born on May 14, 1909 in Yaroslav, Latvia.

Serving as the Head of the 4th Police Precinct of the Militia Police of the District of Rēzekne, Puntulis reported to Alberts Eichelis (Note: Also known as Albert Eihelis, Alberts Eihelis, Albert Yanovich Eichelis, and other variations.) and served alongside Boļeslavs Maikovskis. Puntulis was the leader of a special firing squad that carried out mass murders in Maltā and the Audrini massacre, executing the entire population of the village, including the public execution of 30 villagers in the public square of Rēzekne. (Note: The FBI note reads: "And why should Heralds Puntulis sit on the accused bench? He was the man who was at the head of a man-shooting commando, specially organized from 20 policeman, which, systematically and on a mass scale, murdered peaceful inhabitants in the Rezekne and Ludza Districts. Sadists subservient to them completed their bloody deed in the Ancupani hills; at his command, rifle salvos caused the Audrini people to collapse in the market square of Rezekne.") (Note: The FBI note reads: "Puntilis commanded the fourth Rezenke police precinct, according to occupation documents. One police report says that 713 Jews were executed by the police of this precinct. And witnesses testified that Puntilis gave the firing signal at nearly all mass executions in the district.") (Note: The FBI note reads: "He [Puntilis] was the stooge of Alberts Eihelis, Chief of the Militia Police of the District of Rezekne, and, as such, he was the Head of the 4th Police Precinct from July 27, 1941 until May 1944; he was also the leader of a special firing squad... The public murder of the 30 audrinites on the market place in Rezekne was done by the Puntulis-led firing squad. In July 1941, thus very soon after the Hitler invasion, Puntulis and his firing squad killed, in the forest of Balda, all of the Jewish inhabitants of the village of Silmala. Shortly afterwards, the brutes invaded the village of Riebini. Puntulis gave us instructions for the forthcoming action, testified [another co-]accused J. Basankovics; 'He said that all Jews living in Riebini would be shot'. Very soon, several hundreds of unfortunate men, women, and children were taken to the forest and shot. After that, in the pastor's residence in Riebini, there took place a drinking party, 'in honor of the completed action', where [co-accused] Basankovics saw Puntulis and other leading police functionaries.)

Following WWII, Puntulis fled to Canada via Sweden, arriving in Quebec City aboard the Empress of Canada on October 13, 1948. He moved to Toronto, worked as a building contractor and married, living in relative obscurity, and became a Canadian citizen. A minor protest by Jews occurred outside his Willowdale home in 1979.

In 1965, the USSR requested that Puntulis be extradited in order to face trial for war crimes. (Note: The FBI note reads: ""Laiks," a anti-Communist Latvian language newspaper, published in Brooklyn, New York, Volume 17, Number 48.(1574), dated June 16, 1965, contains an article on Page 5, Column 4 entitled, "A New Soviet ..attack." This article refers to a "Tass" report informing that the Soviet Government has requested extradition of three Latvian nationals accused of war crimes during the German occupation of Latvia. The alleged "war criminals" are Boleslavs Maikovskis of Mineola, Long Island, New York, Harolds Puntulis of Toronto, and Eichels in Karlsmuke, West Germany. The "Tass" report informs that the extradition requests have been submitted to the American, Canadian, and West Germany Embassies in Moscow.") However, Canada and the USSR did not have an extradition treaty and the Canadian government refused. Between 1965 and his death in 1982, the Canadian government did not prosecute Puntulis in Canada or establish an extradition treaty with the USSR.

The Canadian Department of External Affairs took the position in a 1965 memo that: " [Puntulis], regardless of anything else he may or may not have been doing, was in a state of armed revolt against the Soviet Union", and that his acts during this time " …may equally well be considered to have been acts of civil war… and can be considered to be political offences and therefore not extraditable", a position that may have been informed by the fact that many accused Nazi war criminals from Eastern Europe were also anti-communists.

Tried in absentia in a Riga court, Puntulis was convicted of the murder of 713 Jews, 28 gypsies, and nine communists. During the trial, that concluded on 30 October 1965, Puntulis was named as having personally shot an 11-year-old Jewish boy in the head after a subordinate failed at the task.

Following a tip from Simon Wiesenthal, Jeff Ansell, a Canadian investigative journalist, and fellow reporter, Paul Appleby, conducted a year-long investigation into Puntulis and Helmut Rauca, another Nazi war criminal also living in Canada. On 28 August 1982, in an exposé published in TODAY Magazine, a supplement in 18 Canadian newspapers, Puntulis was, for the first time, publicly identified as a war criminal living in Canada. Sensationally, the exposé article was emblazoned with a maple leaf and a swastika. Puntulis died seven weeks before the exposé was published.

David Levy, the Moscow correspondent for CBC News, who was in Riga for Puntulis' 1965 trial, described, in 1982, the trial as a "...show trial, but [with] no inquisitorial atmosphere. The fact is, they had evidence."

According to Ansell, the United States Office of Special Investigations had files on Puntulis as a part of its work to locate and bring to justice Nazi war criminals, but the Canadian government did not request these files or demonstrate an interest in investigating Puntulis. Ansell claimed that, in 1980, Puntulis made a sealed deposition before the Ontario Supreme Court and testified in the West German trial of Eichelis. Historian Atli Rodal, author of the Rodal Report for the Deschênes Commission of Inquiry on War Criminals in Canada, wrote that an interdepartmental meeting of the Canadian government concluded that there was "substantial evidence against Puntulis, and that revocation of citizenship seemed possible", but that then-Minister of Justice Pierre Elliott Trudeau dismissed the possibility, concerned about domestic political considerations with Eastern European communities in Canada.

The Canadian government began denaturalization proceedings against Nazi war criminals in the mid-1990s, after Puntulis' death.

== See also ==
- Daugavas Vanagi
- Ratlines (World War II)
- The Holocaust in Latvia
- War criminals in Canada
