= List of massacres in Latvia =

The following is a list of massacres that have occurred in Latvia (numbers may be approximate):

== Massacres during the Latvian War of Independence ==
Name	Date	Location	Deaths	Notes
White Terror	1919 to 1920	across Latvia	3,000 to 4,000	These estimates are very fragmentary, as there is still little data from some regions such as Latgale.
Red Terror	1918 to 1920	across Latvia	1,500 to 2,000	These estimates are very fragmentary, as there is still little data from some regions such as Latgale.

== Massacres during World War II ==
Name	Date	Location	Deaths	Notes
Liepāja massacres	1941	Liepāja and vicinity, including Priekule, Aizpute, and Grobiņa	5000+	5,000+ Jews. as well as gypsies, communists and the mentally ill were killed in a series of mass executions, many public or semi-public, in the city of Liepāja
Daugavpils Ghetto	June 26, 1941 to October 1943	Daugavpils and vicinity, including Pogulyanka (Poguļanka) Forest (sometimes called Mežciems forest).	13,000 to 16,000 Jews, mostly Latvians with some Lithuanians	
Burning of the Riga synagogues	July 4, 1941	Riga	400	All synagogues were destroyed and 400 Jews were killed
Bikernieki Forest Massacres	July 7, 1941 - 1944	Bikernieki Forest near Riga	30.000 - 46.000	Execution of between 30,000 and 46,000 victims of Nazism, mostly Latvian Jews
Rēzekne massacre	July 1941	Rēzekne	2,500	Killings were carried out by a German SD group, which was helped by Selbstschutz men and Arajs Kommando. Beginning in July 1941 and into the fall, about 2,500 Jewish men, women and children were murdered.
Ventspils massacre	July 16-July 18, 1941 and July–August, 1941	Ventspils	1,000	Soon a poster appeared on the Kuldīga-Ventspils highway, which said that Ventspils was Judenfrei (free of Jews).
Jelgava massacres	Second part of July or early August, 1941	Jelgava and vicinity	Separate estimates of 1,500, 1,550, and 2,000 victims have been made.	German police along with Latvian auxiliary police murdered the Jewish inhabitants of the city during a series of mass shootings
Varakļāni massacre	August 4, 1941	Varakļāni	540	The Nazis forced 540 remaining Jews to dig their own graves, and then shot them to death
Rumbula massacre	November 30 and December 8, 1941	Rumbula forest (near Riga)	25,000	About 24,000 Latvian Jews and 1,000 German Jews were murdered in or on the way to Rumbula forest near Riga.
Audriņi massacre	January 3-4, 1942	village of Audriņi, Audriņi Parish, Rēzekne Municipality	215	215 inhabitants were killed, including 51 children
Dunamunde massacre	March 15-26, 1942	Daugavgrīva, Latvia	3,740	About 3,740 German, Czech, and Austrian Jews were killed by the Nazi German occupying force and local collaborationists in Biķernieki forest.

== Post-war massacres ==
Name	Date	Location	Deaths	Notes
lecava massacre	September 20, 1997	Iecava Parish, Bauska Municipality	8	Yuri Chubarov kills 7 people and injures one in a shooting, then commits suicide
Gulbene kindergarten massacre	February 22, 1999	Gulbene	4	19-year-old Alexander Koryakov entered a Gulbene kindergarten and hacked three girls to death with a meat cleaver. He also killed a teacher and wounded a nurse before trying to escape. After his arrest, he told police that he wanted to become famous. Koryakov was sentenced to life imprisonment on December 7, 1999.
