= Romani people in Estonia =

Romad
Total population
- 1,250

Regions with significant populations
- Harjumaal, Tartumaal, Valgamaal, Pärnumaal, Raplamaal

Languages
- Lotfitka and Xaladytka, Estonian, English, Russian; Historically Laiuse Romani

Religion
- Majority Christianity

Related ethnic groups
- Romani people in Latvia, Romani people in Lithuania, Romani people in Finland, Romani people in Sweden, Romani people in Denmark, Finnish Roma

The Romani people in Estonia, known locally as the Mustlased or the Romad, are an Indo-Aryan people that represent a small minority population in Estonia.

Estonian Roma were killed during the Romani Holocaust of World War II, with estimates between 800 and 1,000 people killed. Approximately 5% of them survived. In 2007, a memorial for the murdered was unveiled in Kalevi-Liiva.

Based on 2013 data, the Council of Europe estimates that approximately 1,250 Romani people reside in Estonia (0.1% of the population).

The Estonian Roma speak mostly the Lotfitka Latvian dialect but also speak the Xaladytka Russian Romani (also called Ruska) dialect.
