= Norwegian Travellers =

Norwegian Traveller can refer to:

- Indigenous Norwegian Travellers, an ethnic minority
- Norwegian and Swedish Travellers (or Tater), a group of Romani people
- Traveller Norwegian language
