= Romani people in Lithuania =

Čigonai
Total population
- 2,115 (2011 census); 3,000 (Council of Europe)

Regions with significant populations
- Vilnius, Kaunas, Šiauliai, Marijampolė, Panevėžys

Languages
- Baltic Romani, Lithuanian, English, Russian

Religion
- Majority Christianity

Related ethnic groups
- Romani people in Latvia, Romani people in Estonia, Romani people in Poland, Romani people in Sweden, Romani people in Finland

The Romani, also spelled Romany or Rromani (/ˈroʊməni/ ROH-mə-nee or /ˈrɒməni/ ROM-ə-nee), colloquially known as the Roma (sing.: Rom), are an Indo-Aryan ethnic group who traditionally lived a nomadic, itinerant lifestyle. According to the Council of Europe, around 3,000 Romani people live in Lithuania (0.08% of the population).

According to the 2011 population and housing census in Lithuania, 2,115 Roma were residing in Lithuania. Since 1989, the population of Romani people in Lithuania is gradually decreasing. In 1989 2,718 Roma people were living in Lithuania while in 2001 2,571 Roma lived in the country. According to the 2011 Lithuanian data, 81% of Lithuanian Roma lived in urban areas, 19% Lithuania Roma lived in rural areas. Most of the Lithuanian Roma lived in Vilnius, Kaunas, Šiauliai, Marijampolė and Panevėžys counties.

The first Roma restaurant in Lithuania opened in 2020. It serves traditional Romani food, such as goulash, savijako (a type of pie), and humer (a soup dish).

In 1942, Nazi Germany occupied Lithuania and began mass arrests of Romani people, who were then transported to concentration camps and forced to work in Germany and France. Approximately one thousand Romani people were deported from Lithuania, with most of them eventually returning. Many Romani people were killed within Lithuania, particularly in Pravieniškės, near Švenčionys, and in the Šalčininkai district. Documents indicate that the majority of Romani people in Vilnius were killed in Kirtimai, although the exact number of Roma victims remains unknown.

== See also ==
- The Holocaust in Lithuania
