= No fixed abode =

Not having a fixed geographical location as a residence

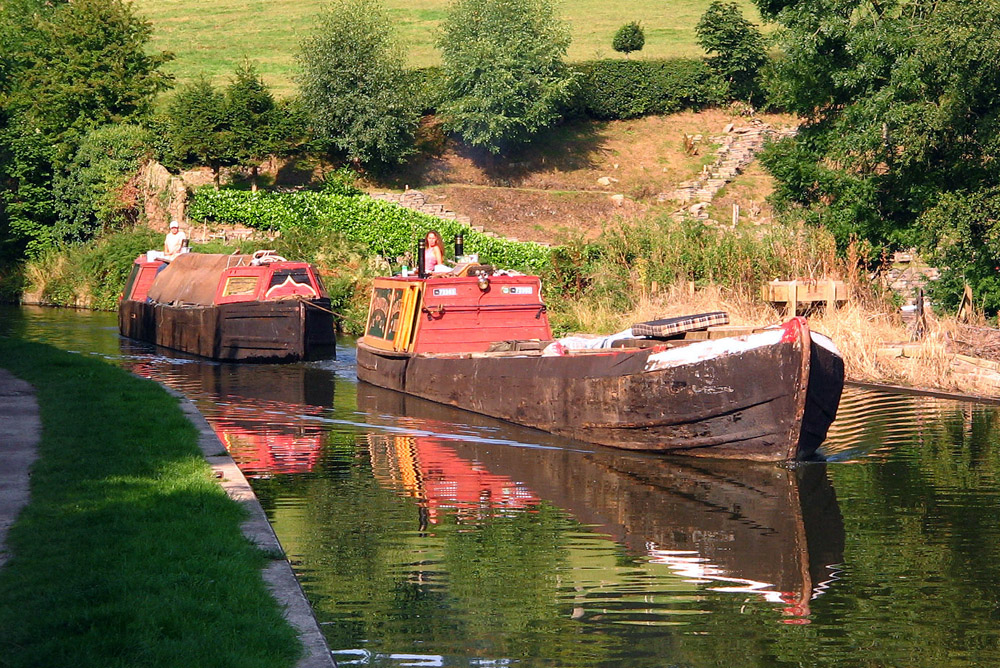
People living and working on a boat may be "of no fixed abode", but are not homeless.

In law, no fixed abode or without fixed abode is not having a fixed geographical location as a residence, commonly referred to as no fixed address. This is applicable to several groups:

- People who have a home, but which is not always in the same place:
  - Those whose occupation requires them to live permanently on boats, ships or movable oil platforms, or to travel constantly (as showmen, for example).
  - Nomadic peoples (e.g. Indigenous Norwegian Travellers and Romanichal) and traveller groups (e.g. Irish Travellers, Scottish Gypsy and Traveller groups, New Age travellers, Norwegian and Swedish Travellers); as well as individuals who adopt a mobile lifestyle, living in narrowboats, recreational vehicles or the like.
  - People with multiple residences who frequently move around these addresses.
  - Persons who temporarily live with people such as friends and family.
- People considered to be homeless. The term "of no fixed abode" or "no fixed address" is frequently used as a description by the police and a euphemism by the media for somebody who is without a home.
- People may be homeless because of some natural disaster or conflict, which may have destroyed their home. Refugees fleeing a war zone are also regarded as homeless.

A person with no fixed address may have mail addressed to a Poste restante service. Such individuals may also encounter challenges in accessing government social services, registering to vote, and may be deprived of many common services.

== Ships ==
Ships may have a mobile letter box that can be placed on the dockside whilst a ship is moored in port or the crew are on shore leave, allowing the delivery of mail to those living on the ship—for as long as the vessel is in that port.

== See also ==
- Digital nomad
- Hunter-gatherer
- Perpetual traveler
- RV lifestyle
- Showmen
