= Romani people in Denmark =

Romaer
Total population
- 5,500

Regions with significant populations
- Helsingør and Copenhagen

Languages
- Romani, Danish, English

Religion
- Majority Christianity

Related ethnic groups
- Romani people in Sweden, Romani people in Norway, Romani people in Finland, Romani people in Germany, Romani people in the Netherlands, Pakistanis in Denmark, Scottish Romani and Traveller groups

Romani people in Denmark constitute a small minority group in the Kingdom of Denmark. Based on 2013 data, the Council of Europe has estimated that around 5,500 Romani people live in Denmark (0.1% of the Danish population). The Danish Roma minority speak Scandoromani.

The first recorded Romani people in Denmark came from Scotland in the year 1505. Danish police drove out most Roma in Denmark by 1939. Today, Danish Roma are concentrated in Helsingør and Copenhagen.
