= Rezekne Airport =

Airport in Rēzekne, Latvia

Rezekne Airport Rēzeknes lidlauks
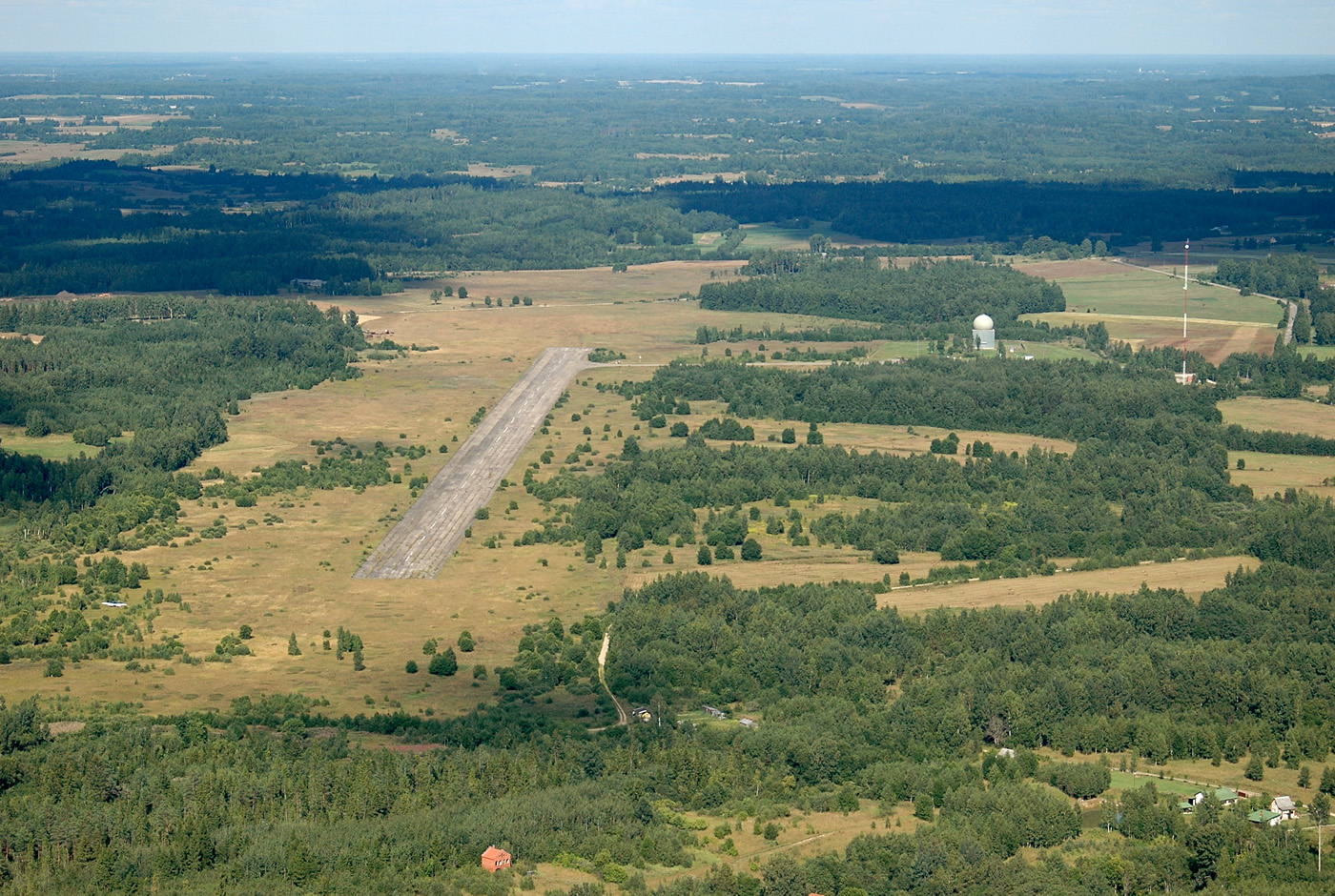
- IATA: none; ICAO: EVNA

Summary
- Airport type: Military
- Owner: Ministry of Defense of Latvia
- Serves: Rēzekne
- Location: Kuciņi, Rēzekne Municipality, Latvia
- Elevation AMSL: 502 ft / 153 m
- Coordinates: 56°33′23″N 27°12′47″E

Map

Runways
Direction	Length		Surface
Direction	ft	m	Surface
05/23	4,265	1,300	Concrete

Rezekne airport is an uncertified airfield in Rēzekne Municipality. Located in Audriņi Parish in Kuciņi, northwest of Rēzekne, 10 km from the city center. The airfield has one 1300 m long and 40 m wide concrete runway. The owner of the airfield is the Ministry of Defence. NATO air defense radar TPS-117 is located near the airfield, which is able to control the airspace within a radius of 450 kilometers and at an altitude of 30 kilometers.

== History ==
Rezekne airfield was created Sopwith Strutter Sopwith Camel were stationed at the airfield.

The civil airport was built in the 1970s and offered only the flight Rēzekne-Rīga, it was soon discontinued.

After the restoration of Latvia's independence in 1992, the Rezekne airfield was kept in state ownership and transferred to the possession of the Ministry of Defence. In 2001, the government of Latvia signed an agreement with the US company Lockheed Martin for the purchase of a radar system worth eight million euros that meets NATO requirements. Residents of Rēzekne city and district collected approximately 17 thousand signatures against the installation of radar in Audriņi Parish. The long-range three-dimensional radar TPS-117 was nevertheless installed in 2004. The Ministry of Defense paid compensation in the amount of 140,000 euros to Audriņi Parish and six neighboring parishes, which were invested in the purchase of paramedic station equipment and health monitoring.

In 2009, an application was received to privatize the airfield registered in the land register under the name of the Ministry of Defense. The committee established by the Cabinet of Ministers decided that the Rēzekne airfield will not be transferred to privatization. From the airport, panoramic flights for groups and individuals over the lakes of Rēzekne and Latgale are possible, as well as the possibility to see the EU border from a bird's eye view.
