= Romani people in Sweden =

Romer
Total population
- 25,000–42,500

Regions with significant populations
- Malmö, Stockholm, Gothenburg

Languages
- Romani, Swedish, English

Religion
- Christianity, Romani folk religion, Islam, Hinduism, Sikhism, Buddhism, or unaffiliated

Related ethnic groups
- Romani people in Denmark, Romani people in Norway, Romani people in Finland, Romani people in Estonia, Romani people in Latvia, Indians in Sweden

In 2013, it was estimated that there were about 50,000 Romani people in Sweden. Romani people are one of the oldest ethnic minority groups in the country. They mainly live in Malmö, Stockholm and Gothenburg.

There are around 25,000 Romani in Sweden who descend from a wave of Romani migration to Sweden in the early 16th century. The rest of the Romani population consists of Romani migrants or Romani people who have descended from migrations that occurred since the early 20th century. Romani people are one of five recognized minorities in Sweden. The Romani language is also officially recognised as a minority language in Sweden. Despite this recognition in Sweden, the Roma remain one of the most marginalized communities in the country. Romani people have been discriminated in Sweden since at least the 20th century.

The first evidence of Romani presence dates back to 1512, when thirty Romani families arrived in Stockholm from Helsinki, Finland. Precise dates of Romani presence in Sweden are found in the Swedish Chronicle of Olaus Petri.

Many Swedish Traveller families were of Roma origin, specifically Romanisael. They travelled throughout Sweden without a permanent residence and many of them were not registered in the parish-based population registers. In the 1980s, the Swedish genealogists Håkan Skogsjö and Bo Lindwall, Södertälje, conducted groundbreaking research on how to trace Swedish Traveller families in historical sources.

Radio Sweden and the Swedish Television Network are broadcasting programs in the Romani language in Sweden.

Hate crimes and violence targeting the Roma community are frequent in Sweden. Anti-Roma sentiment in the country has led to feelings of fear, exclusion, and inferiority among Romani individuals. Additionally, this hostility has contributed to mental health issues within the Romani population in Sweden, including stress, trauma, sleep disturbances, insomnia, and depression.

Roma people, especially those from Romania, are among the most disproportionately affected groups by human trafficking and exploitation in Sweden. Roma individuals from Eastern Europe are frequently trafficked to Sweden for the purposes of forced begging and theft.

== Notable people ==
- Katarina Taikon – Swedish Romani writer-actor
- Rosa Taikon – Swedish-Romani silversmith and actress
- Zlatan Ibrahimović – Swedish footballer (born 1981):
According to an article in the Czech sports magazine Hattrick, written by Zdeněk Ryšavý, Ibrahimović has Romani heritage through his Catholic Croatian mother. There is no public record of Ibrahimović ever discussing or confirming this claim. He has, however, been subject to anti-Romani verbal abuse and vandalism, based on perceptions of the perpertrators.

== See also ==
- Norwegian and Swedish Travellers
- Racism in Sweden
