= Boļeslavs Maikovskis =

Latvian police officer, former U.S. citizen, convicted World War II war criminal

- Born: Boļeslavs Jazepovich Maikovskis; 21 January 1904; Masteri, Rēzekne county, Vitebsk Governorate, Russian Empire
- Died: 19 April 1996 (aged 92); Münster, Germany
- Other name: Harry Puntulis
- Known for: Leading a firing squad that carried out the Audrini massacre, during World War II
- Board member of: American Latvian Association, as the representative of the Daugavas Vanagi
- Spouse: Janina Ritins (m. 1939)
- Police career
- Country: Latvia
- Allegiance: Nazi Germany
- Department: District of Rēzekne
- Branch: Militia police
- Rank: Head of the 2nd Police Precinct (July 1941–c.May 1944)
- Awards: Iron Cross (2nd class)
- Other work: Carpenter (U.S.)
- Criminal information
- Motive: Antisemitism; Fascism
- Conviction: Murder (in absentia)
- Penalty: Death
- Accomplices: Alberts Eichelis; Haralds Puntulis; anor
- Escaped: To United States in 1951; To Germany in 1987
- Comments: Tried in absentia by the Latvian Soviet Socialist Republic (1965)

Details
- Date: December 1941 – July 20, 1942
- Country: Latvia
- Locations: Audrini, Rēzekne
- Targets: Latvian Jews, gypsies and communists
- Killed: c. 170 – c. 200 people (Note: The FBI note reads: "…126 Jews were 'arrested and liquidated'… [and] 41 alleged 'Communists' were liquidated.")

Boļeslavs Maikovskis (21 January 1904 – 19 April 1996) was a Latvian police officer and Nazi collaborator.

In World War II, Maikovskis served as the chief of the 2nd police precinct of Rēzekne during the German occupation of Latvia. Maikovskis directed the execution of Latvian Jews, gypsies, and communists, and was awarded the Iron Cross for service to the Reichskommissariat Ostland. After the war, Maikovskis emigrated to the United States in 1951. Requests to extradite him to Latvia to face criminal charges were refused by the U.S. government. In 1965, he was tried in absentia, was convicted of murder, and sentenced to death. (Note: The FBI note reads: "Those given the death sentence in absentia were Boleslavs Maikovskis, now living in Mineola, L.I.; Harold Puntilis (sic.) of Willowdale, Ont., Canada, and Albert Eichelis of Karlsruhe, West Germany… All the accused were former Latvian police officials.)

Despite his death sentence, in the U.S., Maikovskis served on a subcommittee of the Committee to Re-elect the President during Nixon's 1972 campaign. Later, he fled to West Germany where he was prosecuted for war crimes; however, charges were dropped due to his ill health, and Maikovskis died of natural causes in Germany, aged 92 years, 31 years after being sentenced to death.

== Biography ==
=== In Latvia ===
Boļeslavs Jazepovich Maikovskis was born on 21 January 1904 in Masteri, Rēzekne county, in the Vitebsk Governorate of the Russian Empire, in modern-day Latvia. Maikovskis represented that his father was killed by the Soviets and his two brothers were deported to Siberia. Maikovskis claimed that he commenced university and worked initially as a bookkeeper for a Soviet authority, before being removed for political reasons. In 1933, aged 29 years, Maikovskis claimed that he joined the Aizsargi, a civil guard organization, where he served until Soviet occupation of Latvia in 1940. In interviews, Maikovskis claimed that he was a police clerk who reported to Alberts Eichelis (Note: Also known as Albert Eichelis, Albert Eihelis, Alberts Eihelis, Albert Yanovich Eichelis, and other variations.) and served alongside Haralds Puntulis.

However, in other evidence, Maikovskis served as the Chief of Police of Latgalia, where he assisted the Reichskommissariat Ostland in identifying Latvian partisans that led to the Audrini massacre, where the entire population, along with the partisans captured, were taken to the center of the village and either shot or hanged, believed to be approximately 170–200 people, including 51 children. Evidence was tendered at his trial that, together with Eichelis and Puntulis, Maikovskis directed the public execution of 30 villagers in the public square of Rēzekne. Witnesses claimed that the village of Audrini was burned to the ground and the possessions of the former inhabitants destroyed.

At the conclusion of World War II, Maikovskis and his wife were classified as displaced people, located in Hamburg, West Germany, and they made application for a U.S. visa. However, it was rejected by the United States Displaced Persons Commission on September 5, 1950, due to Maikovskis involvement with the Aizsargi. Following removal of the Aizsargi from the list of subversive organizations, their visa application was reconsidered by U.S. officials. It was reported that he lied on his visa application when asked whether he had "been complicit in the persecutions of others during World War II". (Note: That question was removed from the application the year after Maikovskis emigrated.)

=== Emigration to the United States ===
Granted a visa on November 14, 1951, Maikovskis emigrated to the U.S., and arrived on December 22, 1951, initially living in Brooklyn before purchasing a house with his wife in Mineola, New York. He and his wife lived there for 36 years, and Maikovskis was active in Latvian organizations, including serving of the board of the American Latvian Association, as the representative of the Daugavas Vanagi. He worked as a carpenter until his retirement.

In 1965, the USSR requested that Maikovskis be extradited in order to face trial for war crimes. (Note: The FBI note reads: "The New York Times… issue of June 12, 1965, contained… an article captioned, "Soviet Demands US. Axtradite L.I. Nan," …and read as follows: "The Soviet Union has asked the United States for the extradition of a man living in Mineola, L. I., as an alleged World War II war criminal. Tass, the Soviet press agency, said the man, Boleslavs Maikovskis, lives… [in] Mineola.") (Note: The FBI note reads: "Laiks, a anti-Communist Latvian language newspaper, published in Brooklyn… dated June 16, 1965, contains an article on Page 5, Column 4 entitled, "A New Soviet ..attack." This article refers to a Tass report informing that the Soviet Government has requested extradition of three Latvian nationals accused of war crimes during the German occupation of Latvia. The alleged "war criminals" are Boleslavs Maikovskis of Mineola, Long Island, New York, Harolds Puntulis of Toronto, and Eichels in Karlsmuke, West Germany. The Tass report informs that the extradition requests have been submitted to the American, Canadian, and West Germany Embassies in Moscow.") However, the United States and the USSR did not have an extradition treaty and the U.S. government refused. Tried in absentia in a Riga court, Maikovskis was convicted of murder and sentenced to death on 30 October 1965.

In 1976, the Immigration and Naturalizatiom Service began deportation proceedings against him on grounds he obtained his visa fraudulently after concealing his participation in the crimes. On August 14, 1984, the U.S. Immigration Court ruled to deport Maikovski on the grounds of his participation in war crimes and for lying to gain entry into the United States; Switzerland rejected his request for asylum; in September 1985, the U.S. Court of Appeals rejected Maikovskis' appeal against deportation; and in June 1986, the U.S. Supreme Court directed the Department of Justice to find a suitable country that would accept Maikovskis.

His crimes were detailed in a November 1976 episode of 60 Minutes, and, in 1977, Maikovskis was featured in Howard Blum's book Wanted!: The Search for Nazis in America. During the 1970s and 1980s, Maikovskis became the target of anti-Nazi vigilantes. In August 1978, he was shot in the right knee at his home. In 1979, a man stabbed a person whom he mistook for Maikovskis. In September 1981, Maikovskis's home was bombed by the Jewish Defense League.

=== Flee to Germany ===
After his deportation to the Soviet Union became a certainty, Maikovskis fled from the U.S. in 1987. He settled in West Germany after secretly convincing a diplomatic official to grant him a visa on the grounds of political asylum. In October 1988, Maikovskis was arrested as a suspected war criminal. He was held in a prison hospital until the fall of 1992. Maikovskis was simultaneously prosecuted in the German judicial system, but the case was dropped on health grounds in 1994. He died in Münster in 1996, aged 92, from a heart attack.

== See also ==
- Ratlines (World War II)
- Romani Holocaust
- The Holocaust in Latvia
