= Miranda Vuolasranta =

Finnish Roma politician (born 1959)

- Born: 1959 (age 66–67); Tornio, Finland
- Citizenship: Finland
- Known for: President of the European Roma & Traveller Forum

Miranda Vuolasranta (born 1959) is a Finnish Kale activist, Romani-language teacher and Roma human rights expert, who is President of the European Roma & Travellers Forum.

== Biography ==
Vuolasranta was born in 1959. She grew up in a traditional Romani family, speaking Finnish, Swedish and Romani. Whilst both her parents were illiterate, they encouraged education in Vuolasranta and her four siblings. Despite this, as a young woman she was advised by teachers to ignore her Roma identity in order to succeed in Finnish society. Nevertheless, she graduated as a teacher of Romani language and history after studying in Sweden in the 1970s. Whilst working as a teacher, she became an advocate for Roma rights, firstly as part of a working group on Finnish Roma immigration to Sweden, where she was living. In the 1980s, Vuolasranta returned to Finland and began to use journalism as means to advocate for Roma communities. In 1989 she began to work with the Finnish National Advisory Board on Romani Affairs as a representative of the organisation, Romano Missio.

During the 1990s, Vuolasranta's activism continued. In 1995 she worked to compile Romani language teaching materials for schools. She has been outspoken about the need for the media and schools in Finland to carry out their legal obligation to provide translations for Romani-speaking communities. In 1997 she became Planning Officer for the National Advisory Board on Romani Affairs and in 1998 she became Secretary General of Romani Advisory Board at the Ministry of Social Affairs and Health; she was the first Roma person to hold this position.

From 2002 to 2006 Vuolasranta worked on Roma related Issues at the Council of Europe in Strasbourg. From 2008 to 2012 she was Executive Director of the National Roma Forum of Finland. Subsequently she worked at the Ministry for Foreign Affairs of Finland and from 2013 to 2015 as a policy officer at the European Commission. She has held a number of other positions including Chair of the European Roma Forum. As of 2020 she was President of the European Roma & Travellers Forum.

In 2020, in her role as President of the ERTF Vuolasranta made a statement which encouraged the "Roma nation to come together to fight the pandemic", whilst recognising that many Roma communities ran a high risk of contracting COVID-19.

== Criticism ==
Several prominent members of the Finnish Roma community, including artist Kiba Lumberg, singer Rainer Friman (fi) and author Veijo Baltzar, have criticised Vuolasranta and suggested she leads conservative Roma who seek to downplay problems and exclude critical voices. In 2008 she was forced to pay a fine after Lumberg accused her of defamation.

== Awards ==
- Human Rights Fighter Award (2012) - Finnish Human Rights League.
- Golden Wheel Cross Award (2007) - International Romani Union.
