= Kiba Lumberg =

Finnish artist and activist (born 1956)

Kirsti Leila Annikki Lumberg
- Born: 1956 (age 69–70); Lappeenranta, Finland

Kiba Lumberg, real name Kirsti Leila Annikki Lumberg (born 27 May 1956), is a Finnish artist and author of Finnish Kale descent. She is known as a critic of the traditional Roma culture.

== Biography ==
Lumberg was born in Lappeenranta. She ran away from her family at the age of 13 because of fear, violence, and subjugation. Many of her works are inspired by her childhood experience. Lumberg gained nationwide publicity in 1997 when a television mini-series of the traditional Kale life, based on her screenplay, titled Tumma ja hehkuva veri, was shown on television. In 2007, Lumberg received death threats after criticizing Romani culture on television.

Along with other prominent members of the Finnish Romani community, Lumberg, singer Rainer Friman (fi), and author Veijo Baltzar criticized Miranda Vuolasranta, President of the European Roma & Traveller Forum, accusing her of downplaying problems and excluding critical voices. In 2008, Vuolasranta was forced to pay a fine after Lumberg accused her of defamation.

Lumberg was a Left Alliance candidate in the 2007 Finnish parliamentary elections and in the 2009 European Parliament elections.
