= War criminals in Canada =

The proper handling of war criminals in Canada with regard to criminal prosecution or extradition has been the subject of ongoing debate.

== History ==
Following World War II, Canada held investigations and proceedings against Nazi war criminals that lasted until 1948. During the 1950s, an anti-communist political climate turned public opinion away from the atrocities of World War II and allegedly resulted in an immigration policy which was more permissive to former Nazis. During this period, approximately 40,000 such individuals could more easily demonstrate a non-communist affiliation and therefore emigrated to Canada from Germany. Among the influx of Nazis were an unknown number of suspected war criminals. Ramon Hnatyshyn stated "Canada would not be a haven for those who would commit or who have committed crimes against humanity". Despite growing awareness and some legislative changes it soon became clear that despite having the required legislation, Canada still lacked the political will to prosecute its most senior war criminals.

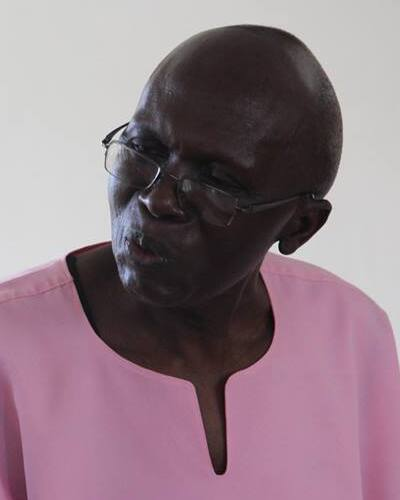
Léon Mugesera is a convicted war criminal who resided in Quebec for nearly two decades before being deported to Rwanda in 2012 to face justice

During the 1990s, suspected war criminals from more recent conflicts came to Canada. These included individuals wanted in connection with war crimes in Bosnia, some of the perpetrators of genocide in Rwanda, members of the Colombian secret police and from Sri Lanka. Léon Mugesera, a Rwandan national, was granted permanent residency in Canada as a refugee in the 1990s but was later identified as an alleged war criminal due to his role in inciting the 1994 Rwandan genocide. The treatment of these suspected individuals was seen to shed light on the prevalent attitudes towards suspected World War II war criminals. Trying such individuals who lacked a support network within Canada, whose atrocities were still fresh in the public's memory and - perhaps most importantly - were unlikely to die soon of old age, became a priority: those who were located were either tried in a court of law or deported. Information on suspected World War II criminals was suppressed by Canada and the United States. Some convicted war criminals were allowed to remain within Canada while some others escaped due process.

=== Deschênes Commission ===
In 1985, the Deschênes Commission was created as a Commission of Inquiry on War Criminals in Canada. The Deschênes Commission found that allegations about alleged Nazi war criminals in Canada had been "grossly exaggerated" by a factor of "over 400%." It recommended a "made in Canada" solution to bringing all war criminals found in this country to justice. Later changes were made to the law of Canada to allow for the prosecution or deportation of suspected war criminals. However, only a small number of cases were pursued.

In 1994 Canada said it would no longer prosecute Nazi war criminals. In 1995, Australian Konrad Kalejs was allowed to leave Canada. Bernie Farber commented on the rescheduling of Kalejs' deportation hearing: "Granting him this delay without incarcerating him is tantamount to letting him escape."

=== Crimes Against Humanity and War Crimes Act ===
In 2000, the Crimes Against Humanity and War Crimes Act passed as a statute of the Parliament of Canada, which implements Canada's obligations under the Rome Statute of the International Criminal Court.

In the years following the 2000 legislation, the lack of any compelling evidence about Nazi war criminals in Canada may have signalled to other potential war criminals from more recent arenas of conflict that Canada was a safe haven. In 2009, Rwandan war criminal Désiré Munyaneza was found living in Toronto, Ontario, Canada. He was the first man to be arrested and convicted in Canada on charges of war crimes and crimes against humanity for his role in the 1994 Rwandan genocide. In 2011, Illandaridevage Kulatunga who was wanted for suspected war crimes in Sri Lanka was able to leave Canada. Manuel De La Torre Herrera, a former Peruvian police officer who stayed in Canada for two years, was apprehended and deported.

=== Yaroslav Hunka scandal ===
On September 22, 2023, World War II veteran Yaroslav Hunka, who fought in the SS Division Galicia of the military wing of the Nazi Party, the Waffen-SS, was invited to the House of Commons of Canada to be recognized by Speaker Anthony Rota, the Member of Parliament for Hunka's district. Hunka received two standing ovations from all house members, including Prime Minister Justin Trudeau. This led to a major international embarrassment for Canada and the resignation of Anthony Rota.

== Simon Wiesenthal Centre ==
The Simon Wiesenthal Centre, an independent organization which has frequently brought suspected Nazi war criminals to trial, has faulted the Government of Canada's efforts to investigate and prosecute Nazi war criminals. A 2012 center publication claimed that approximately 2,000 Nazi war criminals obtained Canadian citizenship by providing false information. However, other sources have published different estimates. The actual number of surviving war criminals is difficult to determine.

== See also ==
- Ahani v Canada (Minister of Citizenship and Immigration)
- László Csatáry – Hungarian Nazi collaborator (1915–2013)
- Kanao Inouye – Canadian war criminal (1916–1947)
- Aleksander Laak – Estonian military personnel, Holocaust perpetrator
- Haralds Puntulis – Latvian police officer, former Canadian citizen, convicted World War II war criminal
- Peter Savaryn – Ukrainian-born Canadian lawyer and Waffen-SS veteran (1926–2017)
- Yaroslav Hunka scandal
