= Veijo Baltzar =

Romani author and visual artist

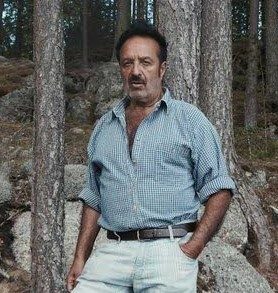
- Born: 9 June 1942 (age 83) Kuopio, Finland
- Period: 1968–present

Website
- veijobaltzar.net

Veija "Veijo" Oskari Baltzar (born June 9, 1942) is a Romani author and visual artist from Finland.

Baltzar's artistic output comprises over 72 literary works, including novels, short stories, plays and musicals, a film, librettos and TV screenplays. Baltzar has described his childhood as extremely poor but very rich socially and spiritually.

In 2011, President Tarja Halonen granted Baltzar the honorary title of Cultural Counselor, which President Alexander Stubb revoked at the end of 2025. Finnish author and actress Oona-Emilia Enkelsaari called for the removal of his honorary title of Cultural Counselor based on Baltzar's previous and recent criminal convictions.

Baltzar was found guilty of having committed sexual crimes in April 2025. He was convicted on two counts of sexual abuse committed between 2016 and 2019 and sentenced to one year and 10 months in prison. Enkelsaari has publicly stated that she is one of the victims.

== Literary works ==
Baltzar's first novel Polttava tie, "The Burning Road" (1968, published in Swedish 1969 as Brännande väg) was successful and brought attention to him. It was the first Finnish book that was written about the Roma and their culture, seen through the eyes of a Roma. Verikihlat (1969), "The Engagement of Blood", is a story about love, hate and blood revenge. In Mari (1972), Baltzar discusses women and their position inside the tribe. Baltzar's 1988 mythic novel Käärmeenkäräjäkivi was a nominee for the Finlandia Prize.

Musta tango (1990), "The Black Tango", tells about Gypsies in modern Finnish society after they moved to the suburbs. Baltzar has also written a novel for children about Gypsies (Mustan Saaran kristallipallo, The Crystal Ball of Black Sarah) in 1978. Phuro, published in 2000, is an extensive epic novel about the Roma living in Central Europe, the saga of a family, which tells a tale of the community through that of the relatives. The latest novel by Veijo Baltzar, In love and war, published in 2008, tells about the tragic fate of European Roma in the middle of the Second World War.

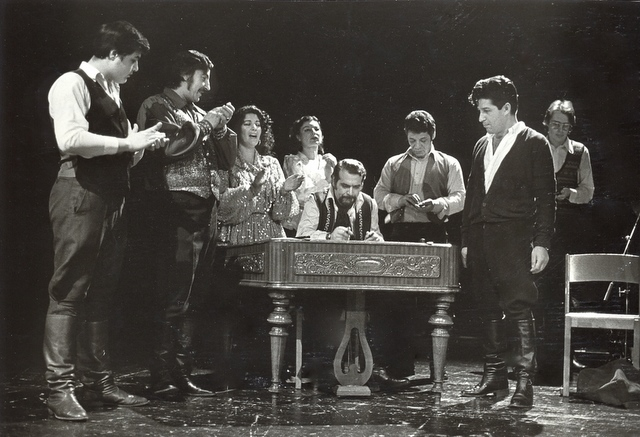
Drom Theater's play "The Black Scourge", 1981–1982

== Theatre ==
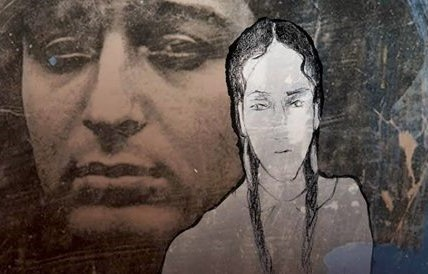
Baltzar's exhibition "Miranda - The Roma Holocaust" in Tallinn, Estonia, 11 May 2017

Veijo Baltzar has written several plays, most of them focusing on Roma, but there are also plays about myths, religion and war. He was the founder of the first and only Roma theatre in Nordic countries, Drom Theatre in 1976. At the beginning of the 1980s, Baltzar worked as a leading teacher in the Theatre Academy of Finland. Baltzar wrote and directed tens of tragedies, poetic plays and musicals to the group.

In the 1990s Baltzar continued playwriting and directing, as well as taught in municipal and state institutions. In Imatra, he wrote and directed a folk opera Orli with 200 actors 1994–1997. The premiere of so-called "second" Orli, patronaged by Finland's Prime Minister Paavo Lipponen, took place in the Finlandia concert hall in March 1997. Since 2013, Veijo Baltzar has produced theatrical and music work at the premises of Alexander theatre.

== Pedagogical work ==
When Baltzar started managing his own theatre and teaching / directing in 1976, he created his own pedagogical method based on multicultural emotional intelligence, known as Intercultural Experiential Education. In 2012, Baltzar published a polemic work Towards Experiential Philosophy (Kokemuspohjainen filosofia in Finnish), in which he introduces his pedagogical method and its philosophical and educational background. The book was published in English in 2014.

== Romani activism ==
In 2002, in order to strengthen the position of Romani literature worldwide, Baltzar founded the International Roma Writers Association: A joint organization (IRWA) and acted as its president between 2002 and 2005.

Baltzar has been active in promoting Roma policies in Finland since 1965. Alongside other members of the Finnish Roma community, including artist Kiba Lumberg and singer Rainer Friman (fi), he has criticised Miranda Vuolasranta, President of the European Roma & Traveller Forum and suggested she leads conservatism in the Roma community who seek to downplay problems and exclude critical voices.

In 2014, Baltzar organized an international minister-level The Conscience of Europe conference at the Finnish Parliament. The conference critically addressed the issues of multicultural society in Europe. The conference issued a 24-item set of proposals for law initiatives for reforming European policies of multiculturalism, which were then sent to European Commission.

== Visual arts ==
Veijo Baltzar has been engaged in the visual arts since the late 1960s. His works were presented at the exhibition for young artists in the Ateneum art museum in 1975. Since then Baltzar has had numerous exhibitions in different parts of Finland, Sweden and the Czech Republic. Since the 1980s Baltzar has also done architectural design.

== Criminal cases ==
=== Criminal sentence in 2005 ===
A building that was in a nominal ownership of Baltzar's son burned down in March 2003. Baltzar was found guilty of attempted aggravated insurance fraud and received a one-year suspended prison sentence from the Turku Court of Appeal in 2005.

=== Crimes committed between 2004–2019 ===
Baltzar was detained on 21 November 2019 by the Helsinki District Court for suspected crimes against seven underage and adult women born in the 1980s–2000s. Baltzar was suspected with a probable cause of human trafficking, aggravated human trafficking, sexual abuse, aggravated sexual abuse of a child, rape, aggravated rape, assault, and unlawful threat. The crimes were suspected of having taken place in Helsinki, Espoo, Raseborg, Suonenjoki, and Kuopio between 1 August 2004 and 19 November 2019.

On 24 November 2019, the newspaper Helsingin Sanomat published a multi-page story about Baltzar's alleged inappropriate behaviour against young women, some of them underage, whom he had recruited to his theater productions.

Baltzar was found guilty of two counts of sexual abuse by the Helsinki Court of Appeal on 29 April 2025. He was sentenced to one year and 10 months of imprisonment and ordered to pay damages for the victims.

== Works ==
Novels by Veijo Baltzar (Tammi publishers):

- In Love and War (Sodassa ja rakkaudessa) (2008)
- Phuro (2000)
- The Black Tango (Musta tango) (1990)
- The Snake Trial Stone (Käärmeenkäräjäkivi) (1988)
- The Chrystall Ball of the Black Sara (Mustan Saaran kristallipallo) (1978)
- Mari (Mari) (1972)
- The Engagement of Blood (Verikihlat) (1969)
- The Burning Road (Polttava tie) (1968)

Plays by Veijo Baltzar (written and directed)

Whole night plays

- 1981 The Black Scourge (Musta ruoska). Roma theatre Drom.
- 1982 The Hungry Cranes (Nälkäkurjet). Drom Theatre.
- 1980 The Crystal Ball of Black Sarah. A play for children. Performed in theatre Green Apple in Helsinki.
- 1983 I'll Forge Stone to Be a Horse (Taon kivestä hevosen). Drom Theatre. Performed at the International Theatre Festival 22.–26.11.1985, Deutsches Schauspielhaus, Hamburg.
- 1984 Iron Nights (Rautayöt). Drom Theatre.
- 1986 Iron Horses (Rautaratsut). Drom Theatre.
- 1991 The God Is Great (Jumala on suuri). Passion play. 1993
- 1992 The Paradise of Gods (Jumalten Paratiisi). Kuopio Student Theatre.
- 1993 Backyard Carmen (Takapihan Carmen) 1993. Kuopio Student Theatre.
- 1993 The Gang (Jengi)
- 1993 The Dance (Tanssi)
- 1993 I Will Not Leave My Friend (Kaveria ei jätetä).
- 1996 The Forest of Women (Naisten metsä).
- 1997 Love and Mary (Rakkauteni Maria) Oratory.
- 1994-1997 ORLI, Folk opera. Premiere at the Imatra Cultural Center 1995. The second version premiered in March 1997 at Finlandia Hall, Helsinki.
- 2004 The Paradise of Gods (Jumalten Paratiisi).
- 2009 BOTOX.
- 2011 The God is Great (Jumala on Suuri).
- 2014 With the Seven-String Guitar. Gipsy cabaret. Premiere at the Alexander Theatre, Helsinki
- 2016 Sin. A musical play. Premiere at the Alexander Theatre, Helsinki

Poetic plays

- 1979 Muistan eläneeni (Remembrance of my life). Theatre Baltzar
- 1982 Tie (The Road). Drom.
- 1983 Yön kulkijat (Wanderers of the night), Theatre Drom
- 1983 Punainen hevonen (The Red Horse). Drom.
- 1985 Mustat kiharat (Black Curls). Drom.
- 2005 Mustalaisrunoteatteri (Gipsy Poetry Theatre).

Others

2012 “Sny” (Dreams). Prague's National Theatre, Nova Scena

== Prizes and awards ==
1980 1st prize in the Golden Harp – competition, Dublin for the manuscript of short movie Punainen puutarha (the Red Garden)

1981 The theatre action of the year. Awarded by Finnish Theatre Center

1992 The Art award of the Province of Kuopio

1991 The Culture award of Rautalampi

1999 The 3rd prize in the international “Amico Rom” - competition. Italy

2000 The 2nd prize in the international “Amico Rom” - competition. Italy

2002 Arvo Turtiainen literature prize

2008 Mikael Agricola medal celebrating 40-year literary career. Helsinki, Tammi publishers

2011 An honorary title of Cultural Counsellor, kulttuurineuvos, granted by the President of Finland Tarja Halonen. The title got revoked in 2025.

2016 Finalist and honorable mention (international recognition for 50-year activity for the benefit of European Roma), European Roma Spirit Award (ERSA). Bratislava, Slovakia

2017 Artist pension, granted by Arts Promotion Centre Finland as recognition for meritious artistic activity
