= Malta, Malta Parish =

Malta Borovaja
- Village
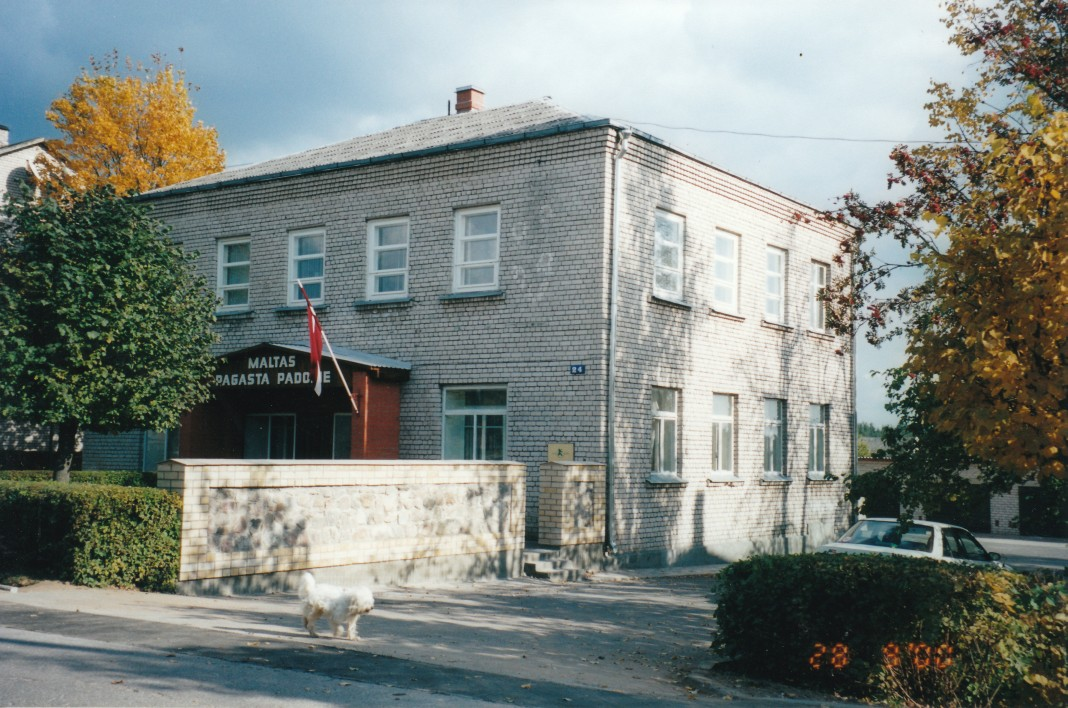
- Malta Parish council in 2000.

- Location within Latvia
- Coordinates: 56°20′50″N 27°09′52″E
- Country: Latvia
- Municipality: Rēzekne Municipality
- Parish: Malta Parish

Area
  - Total: 4.4 km^{2} (1.7 sq mi)
- Elevation: 149 m (489 ft)

Population (2022)
  - Total: 2 172
- ZIP Code: LV-4630 Malta

Malta (until 1936 Borovaja) is a village in the eastern part of Latvia, in Latgale. The center of Malta Parish of Rēzekne Municipality is 21 km from Rēzekne.

Local government institutions in the village: Malta High School, Malta Music School, Malta Pre-School Educational Institution "Dzīpariņš", House of Culture, Malta Parish Library, Children and Youth Center, History Museum, Malta Municipalities Ltd. company, Center for Health and Social Care.

The special primary school of Rēzekne Municipality under the responsibility of Rēzekne municipality is located in Malta.

== History ==
=== Etymology ===
The origin of the name 'Malta' is not clearly documented – it may be related to the verb 'malt'.

=== Beginnings ===
The beginnings of Malta are connected with Rozentova manor, information about which can be found in the 16th century. After the change of some owners, at the time of the 1784 general survey, there were 23 villages and 76 homesteads in the manor. The peasants cultivated 200-tenths of land for the lord, the men also engaged in beekeeping, and the women in weaving.

The last owners of the manor, the Bogomolets family, founded a flax processing factory and a dairy there, which began with the request of the nobleman Filip Mihail Bogomolets on 17 October 1897, to the Vitebsk gubernatorial board for the installation of a milk heating and milk production plant with two steam boilers. The dairy got the patented name "Rozentovo" and produced dairy products, including cheeses of various varieties. The company received awards for quality in London, St. Petersburg, Warsaw, Daugavpils.

=== Railway and village development ===
In 1836 the Saint Petersburg–Warsaw highway was built through the territory of present-day Malta, and later, in 1861, the Saint Petersburg–Warsaw Railway with the Antonopole railway station was opened. Moving from the nearby Rozentova manor towards the newly built railway station, a new settlement was formed – Borovaja, which, thanks to its advantageous location at the intersection of four roads and on the side of the railway, soon became the main trading point of the area.

1873 the first folk school of Rozentova was founded in the parish house.

=== From Borovaja to Malta ===
In 1933, Borovaja was granted the status of a densely populated place (village). 1937. In 1990, the village of Borovaja was renamed Malta (until then Malta was called the current Silmala) the settlement had 139 houses with 715 inhabitants and several dozen shops, which were mainly owned by Jews. At that time, Malta was the largest village in Rēzekne district.

=== War crimes ===
In July 1941, a self-defense group was established in Malta under the leadership of the guard Haralds Puntulis.

According to the testimony of local residents, at the beginning of July, Puntulis and his scout team killed all the Jews of Silmala village in the Balda forest. Immediately following, the killers stormed into Riebini, where Puntulis gave instructions to his subordinates: all Jews must be shot. After the shooting, a celebratory dinner was held in honor of the successful action – Jázeps Basankovičs, a participant in the tragedy, talked about it.

After that, Puntulis and his assistant Drozdovski organized mass murders in Malta. After the initial order to shoot, wealthy Jews were not included in the list, so that they could first be deprived of all their possessions, jewelry and other valuables, and only then killed.

Maltese police officers took part in mass shootings in the Ančupani mountains, where they killed several thousand people, including all the inhabitants of Audriņi sajja.

=== Under Soviet occupation ===
The 1950s and 1960s were important in the growth of Malta, especially the period from 1950 to 1959 when Malta was the center of the district. During this time, intensive construction took place – the culture house was renovated (built in 1939 as the House of Guards), a dairy, an industrial complex, a hospital, and a school were built. Until 1976, the village consisted of 332 individual houses.

== Cultural monuments ==
In the territory of the village there is one architectural monument of national importance and four of local importance.

Monuments of national importance:

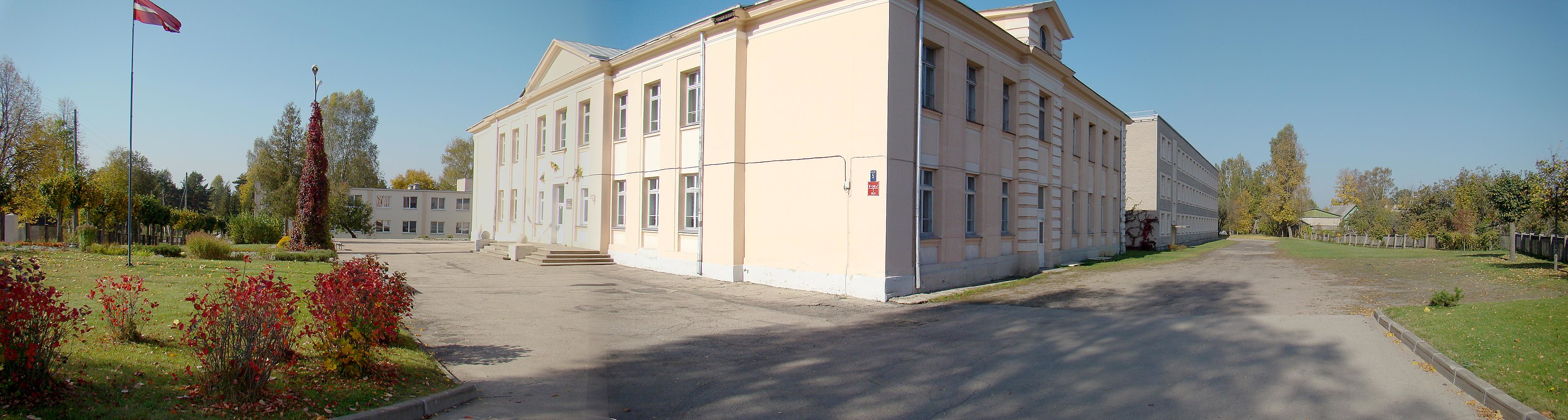
Malta's 1. secondary school panorama view

The Roman Catholic Church of the Exaltation of the Holy Cross in Rosentow(Malta) is a wooden building with one tower. The church was built by the nobleman Antonijs Josef von Felkersam between 1780 and 1782. Soon the church turned out to be too small for the large congregation, which was separated as a separate church in 1801. In 1842, the church was extended for the first time, and in 1906, with the support of the owners of the Rozentova manor, the Bogomelets, it was extended again. Peculiar ferretrons (movable altars) have been preserved in the church.

Monuments of local importance:

The Bell Tower of the Catholic Church in Rozentova (Malta).

Prayer house of the Old Believers community of Malta (Borovka). The construction of the church started in 1931, it was built by the construction contractor A. Gruncevičs.

All Saints' Orthodox Church of Malta (Rozentova). It was built in 1928 as a small wooden log house near the Orthodox cemetery.

The Malta Horse Post Station, built in the middle of the 19th century, is the oldest building in Malta that has survived to this day.
