= Audriņi =

Village in Rēzekne Municipality, Latvia

Coordinates: 56°35′N 27°14′E

Audriņi Audreni
- Village
- Interactive map of Audriņi
- Country: Latvia
- Municipality: Rēzekne
- Parish: Audriņi

Population (2021)
  - Total: 438
- Time zone: UTC+2 (EET)
  - Summer (DST): UTC+3 (EEST)
- Postal code: LV-4611

Audriņi (also Audreņi, Latgalian: Audreni) is a village and the center of Audriņi Parish, Rēzekne Municipality of the Latgale region of eastern Latvia, 245 km east of Riga. It is situated on the banks of the Liužonka River along route P36.

The parish council building, a primary school, cultural center, library, medical station and a Latvian Post office are present in this village.

On the outskirts of the village, an AN/TPS-77(V) air search radar of the Latvian Air Force was built in 2004.

== History ==
=== World War II tragedy ===
The village of Audriņi was completely eradicated and its entire population was liquidated on 3 January 1942 by the Nazi occupation authorities, during World War II. In total 215 inhabitants were killed, including 51 children; later, on 4 January 1942, 30 of them were shot on the market square in Rēzekne; the others in the Ančupāni hills.

Boļeslavs Maikovskis was the Latvian police commander who organized and carried out the massacre. At the end of World War II, the US Central Intelligence Agency recruited him to work for the US Government's operations against the Soviet Union. He was later allowed to emigrate to the United States via the CIA's "ratline", which assisted hundreds of wanted World War II war criminals in escaping justice at the hands of a war crimes tribunal.

In 1966, the US Department of Justice and FBI produced a document as part of their proceedings to revoke the citizenship of Maikovskis. The document relates the story of the Audriņi massacre:

Boļeslavs Maikovskis, the former Chief of the II Section of the Rēzekne district police [...] and Eihelis were the ones who energetically responded to the order that the village of Audriņi be wiped off the face of the earth. On a cold winter night, in December, 1941, Eihelis' and Maikovskis' policemen burst into Audriņi, drove the occupants from their houses, arrested them, and took them to the Rēzekne jail. After the looting of the village, he gave the signal to put fire to the buildings. In this way, under the supervision of the police, all 42 farmers' houses burned to the ground. as a result of the 'successful' operation, a feast took place in the Rēzekne district Police Headquarters, with foodstuffs looted in Audriņi.

Soon after that, on the evening of January 3, a ghastly column of trucks left Rēzekne Prison. The murderers were taking 170 inhabitants of Audriņi, including 51 children, to be killed at Ančupāni Hills. After rifle salvos had done their work, Eihelis still walked around the piles of victims and shot his pistol in order to finish off those people who still showed signs of life. On January 4, 1942, in Rēzekne Market Square, Eihelis directed the public shooting of 30 men and adolescents from Audriņi village.

The U.S. Central Intelligence Agency's Freedom of Information Act Electronic Reading Room has an entire set of documents pertaining to the case of Boļeslavs Maikovskis. Also implicated and tried in absentia was Haralds Puntulis, a Latvian Nazi sympathiser and former platoon commander, who fled to Canada.
