= Indigenous Norwegian Travellers =

Ethnic minority group in Norway

Norwegian Travellers
Regions with significant populations
- Agder and Rogaland

Languages
- Norwegian, Rodi

Related ethnic groups
- Yenish people

Indigenous Norwegian Travellers (better known as Fantefolk or Skøyere) are an ethnic minority group in Norway. They are a wandering people who once travelled by foot, with horse-drawn carts and with boats along the southern and southwestern coastline of Norway.

They are not to be confused with Romanisæl (also known as Tater, who are a subgroup of the Romani people in Norway and Sweden, and have a larger presence).

Indigenous Norwegian Travellers have traditionally almost exclusively been centred around Southern Norway and the very southern parts of Southwestern Norway. They have managed to prevent their culture, language, identity, traditions and history from being absorbed by the larger Romanisæl group of Norway due to being isolated from where they have historically travelled, as Romanisæl have traditionally travelled other parts of Norway, particularly Eastern Norway.

== Origins ==
Similar to indigenous Dutch Travellers, there is very little information on the history of Indigenous Norwegian Travellers. They may have mixed with the Yenish people and Romani people in the past, and they may have Yenish and Romani loanwords in their language.

== Names for the group ==
Known to the settled majority population as fant/fanter/fantefolk or skøyere, they prefer the term reisende ('travellers'). This term is also used by the Romanisæl (the largest population of Romani people in Norway and Sweden), though the two groups are distinct. There are also groups in German-speaking countries who refer to themselves as Reisende, which is German for 'travellers' as well.

Eilert Sundt, a 19th-century sociologist, termed the indigenous Travellers småvandrer or småvandringer ('small travellers’), to contrast them with the Romanisæl (Tater), which Sundt called storvandrer or storvandringer (‘great travellers’) who ranged further in their journeys.

== Language ==
The indigenous Norwegian Travellers used to speak their own language. This language was known as Rodi.

Rodi has heavy lexical borrowings from German Rotwelsch as well as lexical borrowings from Romani too. The German Rotwelsch lexicon found within Norwegian Rodi is theorised to be from Yenish Travellers (German Travellers) migrating to Norway and mixing with indigenous Norwegian Travellers, it is also theorised that indigenous Norwegian Travellers are descended from Yenish Travellers who migrated to Norway centuries ago.

The Romani lexicon found within Norwegian Rodi is not as prominent as German Rotwelsch lexicon. Romani lexicon is found in Norwegian Rodi because of the nearby Romanisæl who live close by to the Indigenous Norwegian Travellers, also some Romani lexicon has come via Yenish Travellers, as their language (German Rotwelsch) has Romani lexical borrowings as well. There are mentions of Romanisæl-Indigenous Norwegian Traveller intermarriage, although despite this the two groups (along with their cultures, languages, traditions, identities and histories) have remained distinct.

The morphology, syntax and grammar of the language is entirely Norwegian. Except for the lexicon of Romani and Rotwelsch origin, the language is entirely Nordic derived.
