= Romani people in Norway =

Ethnic group

Romane manusha ando Norvego (Romani)

Total population
- ≈ 4,000–10,000

Regions with significant populations
- Oslo

Languages
- Norwegian, Romani

Religion
- Christianity, Romani mythology

There are estimated to be around 4,000–10,000 Romani people in Norway. The Romani people were not recognized as one of Norway’s five national minorities until the year 1999.

The small Romani minority in Norway suffered greatly during the World War II. After being denied entry to Norway in 1934, Norwegian Romani families had lived in Belgium and France, under strict state surveillance. With the German occupation of these Belgium and France in the year 1940, the majority of these Romani people later ended up in concentration camps in France, and were later sent to Auschwitz-Birkenau. Only 4 of the 66 Norwegian Romani people sent to the Auschwitz-Birkenau death camp had survived.

The Romani community in Norway are culturally and socially part of the Romanisael and northern Vlax Romani subgroups. The population of Romani migrants in Norway is unknown. An increasing number of Romani migrants have came to Norway. The majority have migrated from Romania. Due to previous assimilation policies, the Romani people in Norway are now primarily sedentary. The majority live in Oslo, with a population of more than 600.

Romani women were forcibly sterilized in Norway.

The first Romani people arrived to the country in the second half of the 19th century as a part of the second Romani diaspora, the emigration of Romani people from Hungary and Romania in around the year 1850.

The Romani originally arrived in Norway during the 1800s but were banned from the country from the 1920s until 1956.

Romanisael in Norway speak the Scandoromani dialect.

A small number of Romani families had come to Norway from France after 1954.

== Culture ==
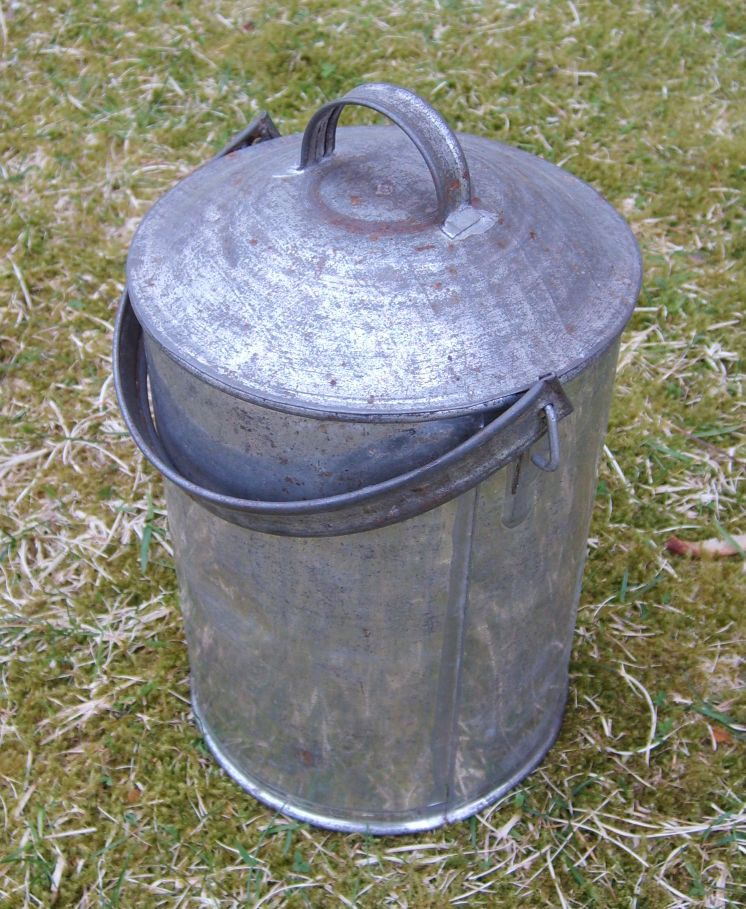

In Norway, the Romani people are well-known and valued for their music. The Yagori Festival is a celebration of Romani music that takes place in Oslo.

== Notable people ==
- Elias Akselsen
- Natalina Jansen
- Stor-Johan
- Cowboy-Laila
- Fant-Karl
- The Wanderer
- Jenny Emilie Pettersen

== See also ==
- Norwegian and Swedish Travellers
- Racism in Norway
- The Holocaust in Norway
