= Romanisael =

Romani subgroup in Norway and Sweden

Romanisael Romanisæl
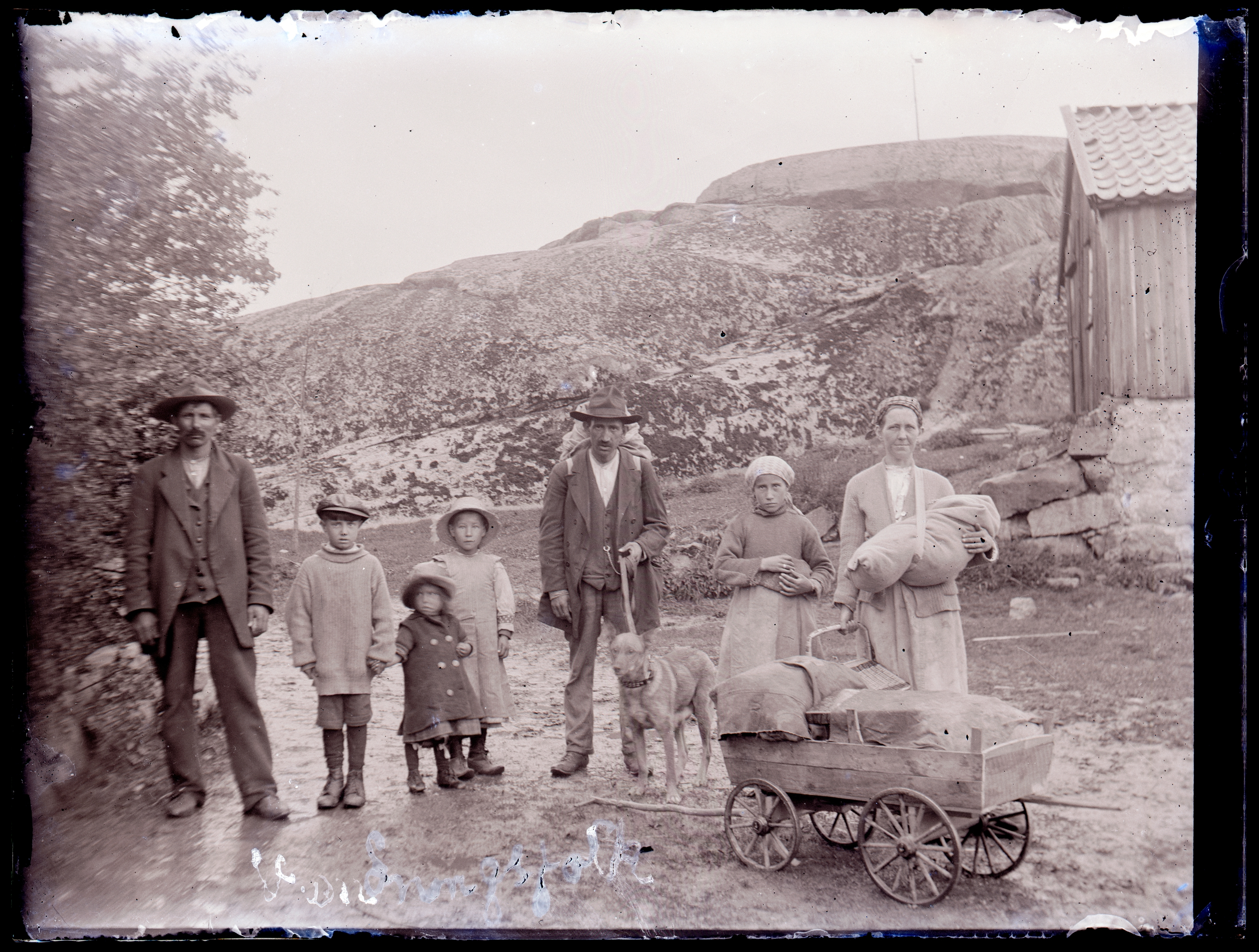
- Romanisael family pictured in northern Bohuslän, Sweden, 1919

Total population
- ≈ 75,000

Languages
- Scandoromani

The Romanisael (also known as Swedish Roma and Norwegian Roma, or Swedish Taters and Norwegian Taters) (Note: Swedish: romer, zigenare, tattare, resande; Norwegian: romanifolket, tatere, sigøynere; Scandoromani: romanisæl, romanoar, rom(m)ani, tavringer/ar, tattare) are a Romani subgroup who have been resident in Sweden and Norway for some 500 years. The estimated number of Romanisael in Sweden is 65,000, while in Norway, the number is estimated to be around 10,000.

== Origins ==
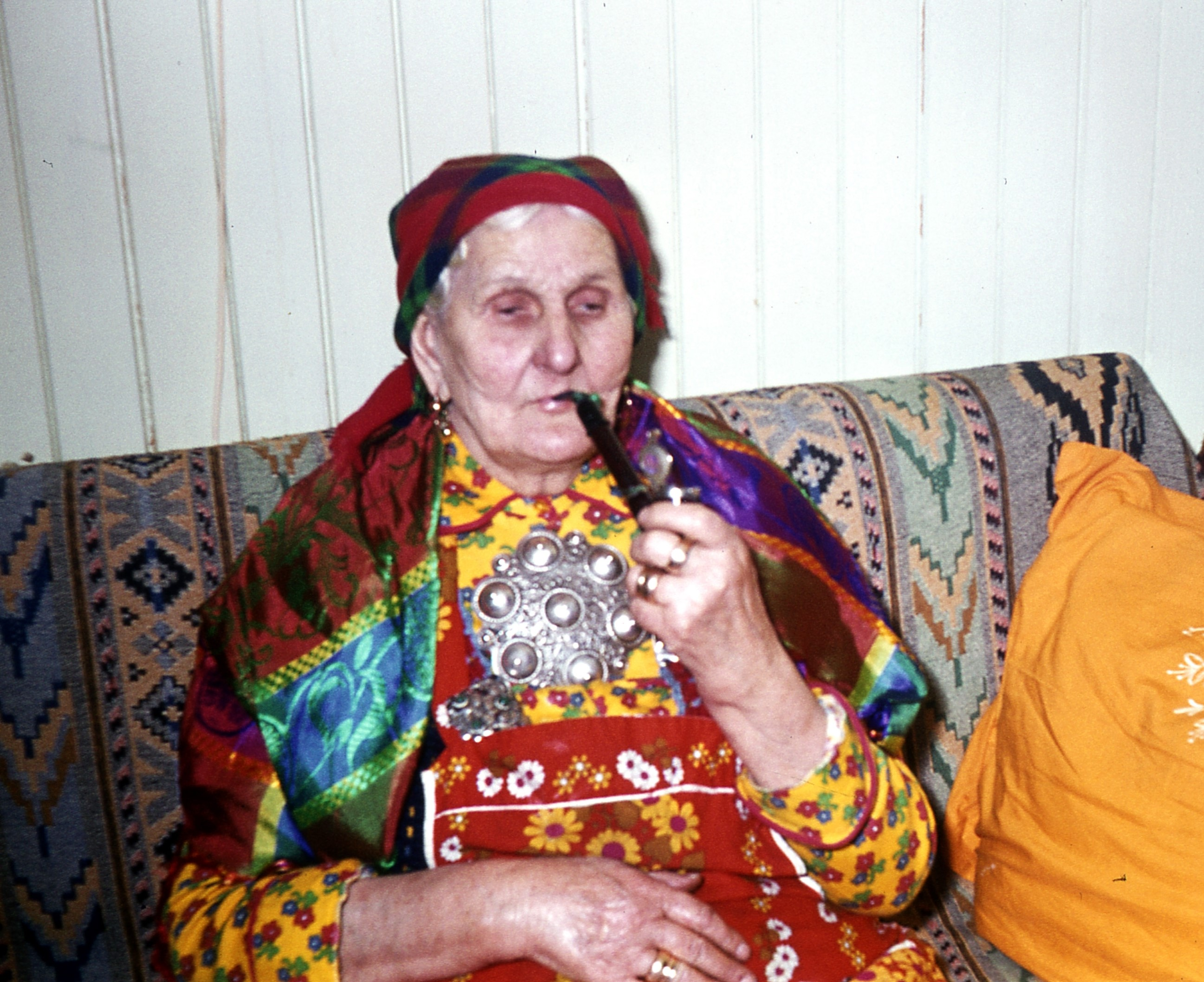
Romanisael woman in Norway

Romanisael history and culture is particularly related to other Romani subgroups in Northern Europe such as Kaale, Kalé and Romanichal.

Modern-day Romanisael (Tater) are the descendants of the first Roma who arrived in Scandinavia during the 16th century. Most were deportees from Britain to Norway, but small numbers came via Denmark. Norwegian and Swedish Romani identify as Romanisæl; this word has same origins as the Angloromani word Romanichal. Romanichal is the word that Romani in England, the Scottish Border and parts of southern Wales use to identify themselves.

The Kaale (or Kàlo) are descendants of early Scandinavian Roma who were deported in the 17th century from Sweden proper to Finland. The Kaale, however, maintain that their ancestors migrated from Scotland.

Romanisael in Norway at times have been confused with the indigenous Norwegian Travellers, although they perceive the latter group to be non-Roma by culture and origins.

== Names for the group ==
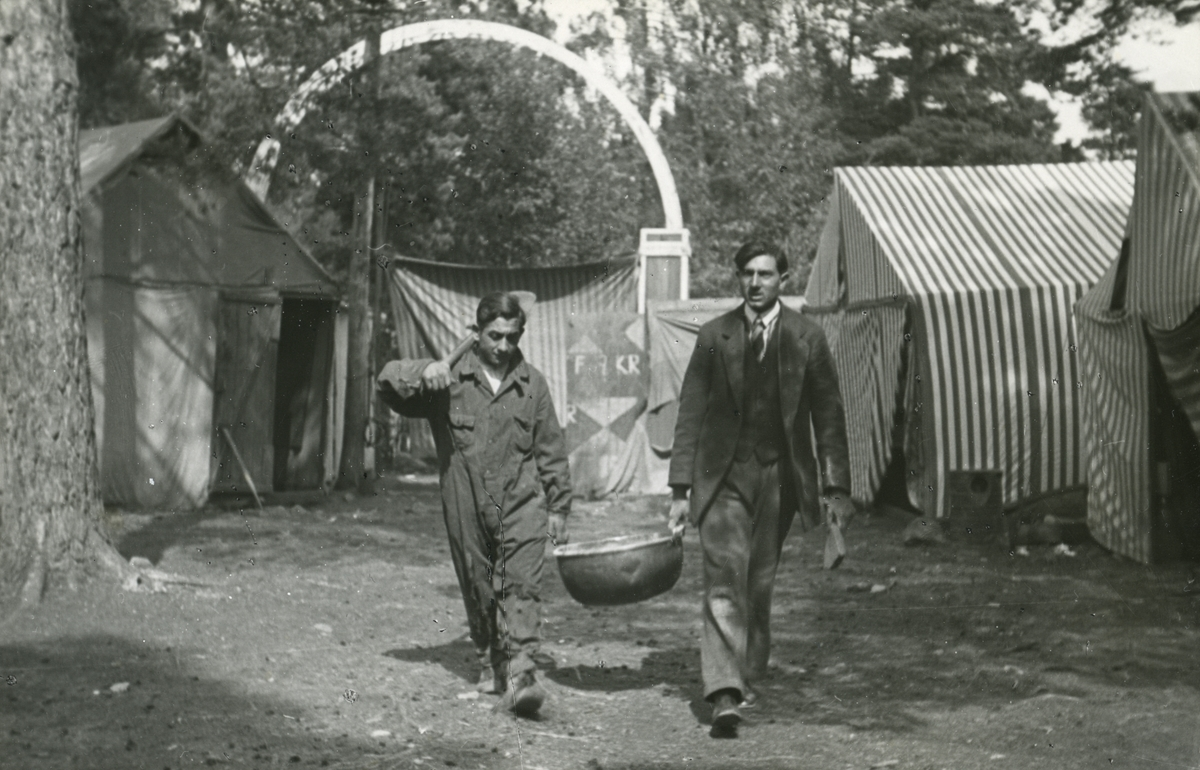
”Romer” in Stockholm, Sweden, 1931

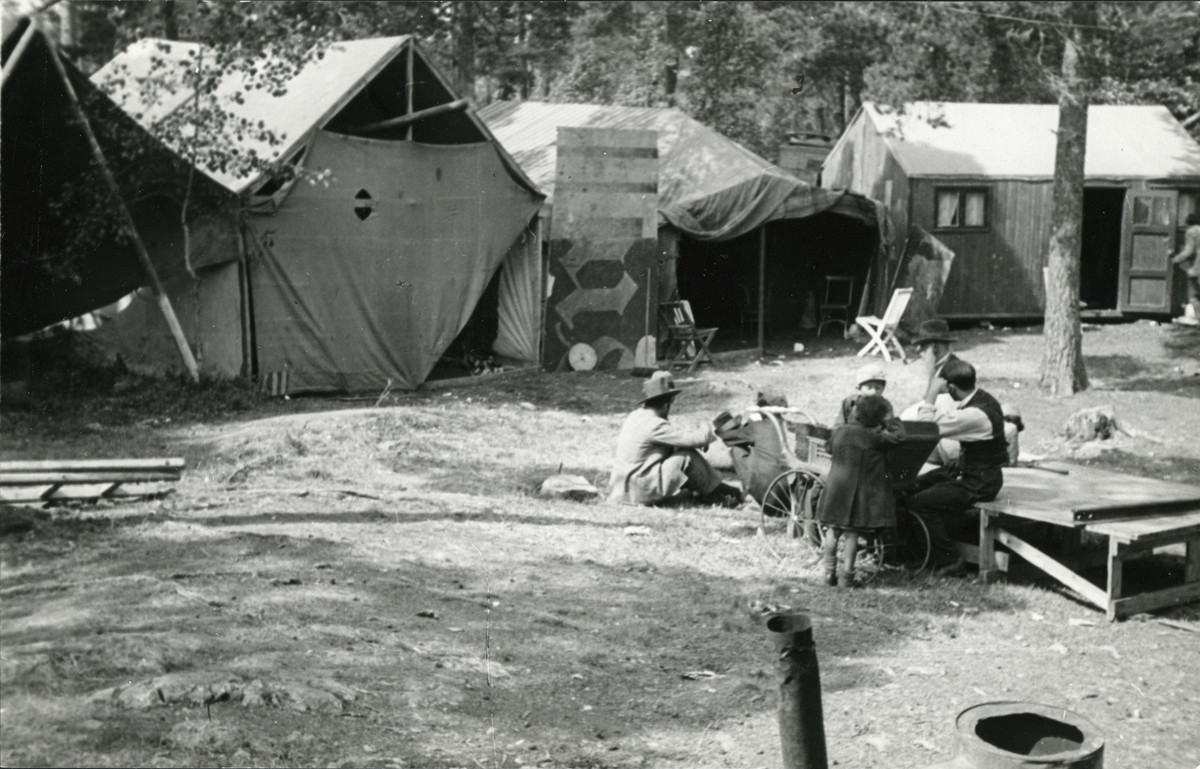
Romani encampment in Stockholm, Sweden, 1931

By the settled majority population, the Romanisael in Norway are commonly known as romanifolk or romanifolket, or by the exonyms tatere or sigønyere ('gypsies'), while endonyms in use are romanisæl, romani, romanoar or vandriar ('wanderers'). In Sweden they used to be called the exonyms tattare or zigenare ('gypsies'), but are officially called by the term romer, while endonyms in use are romanisæl, dinglare or resande ('travellers') or resandefolket ('travelling-people'). Less common is the term tavringar. There has been an attempt to term Swedish Romani as tschiwi, but this usage is contested.

The terms tatere and tattare hint to the original misconception that the Romani in Sweden and Norway were Tatars. In Sweden, tattare is now considered a disparaging term and has been completely abandoned in official use. For Romanisael in Norway however, the name tatere is severely disputed. It does not carry the same stigma as in Sweden; their Norwegian counterparts have fought for the same rights as Swedish Romanisael for many years. Some Romani organizations maintain this term in their official names.

Skojare was a name sometimes used for Romanisael in Sweden; in Norway skøyere was associated with indigenous Travellers. Fant or fanter was a term formerly applied to both Romanisael and non-Romani Travellers in southern Norway. Many of these terms nowadays are considered pejorative due to their connotation of vagabondage and vagrancy.

Since 2000, Romanisael in Sweden are counted as part of the romer national minority, which also includes Kalderash Roma who have arrived from Central and Eastern Europe since the late 19th century and more recent Roma migrants. In Norway, Romanisael are categorized as a national minority group, officially referred to as romanifolk, romanifolket or tatere. In contrast to Sweden, in Norway a distinction is made between romanifolket and rom (i.e., Roma groups that arrived since the 19th century) in the official legislation on national minorities.

== Language ==
Romanisael speak a form of Para-Romani referred to as Scandoromani. Many words of Nordic Romani origin have survived in the Scandinavian languages, both in common speech and slang. Examples from Swedish:

- tjej, meaning 'girl' (originally slang, but now a more common alternative to the older flicka)
- puffra, meaning 'gun' (used to be common slang)
- hak, meaning 'place, joint, establishment' (used to be common slang)
- vischan, meaning 'the countryside', 'boondocks' or 'rural areas' (used to be common slang)

== Organisations ==
Romanisael have founded organisations for preserving their culture and lobbying for their collective rights. One example is Föreningen Resandefolkets Riksorganisation, based in Malmö, Sweden.

== Media ==
Romani Posten (also Romaniposten, 'The Romani Post'; ISSN 0809-8379) was a news magazine for the Romani community in Norway. It had no political or religious affiliation, and published articles in Norwegian. At its most frequent, it came out eight times per year. On 6 September 2003, it was founded as an on-line publication; the first print edition was published in October 2006. Jone Pedersen was the founding publisher and editor-in-chief. As of 2007, it had ceased publication.

== See also ==
- Romani people in Norway
- Romani people in Sweden
