= Audriņi Parish =

Parish in Rēzekne Municipality, Latvia

- parish of Latvia
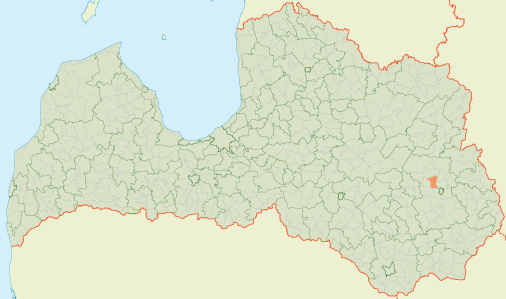
- Coordinates: 56°35′10″N 27°14′03″E
- Country: Latvia

Population (1 January 2026)
  - Total: 879
- Time zone: Eastern European Time
- Website: https://audrini.lv/

Audriņi Parish (Latvian: Audriņu pagasts) is an administrative unit of Rēzekne Municipality in the Latgale region of Latvia.

== Towns, villages and settlements of Audriņi parish ==
- Audriņi (administrative center)
