= Finnish Roma =

Romani subgroup in Finland

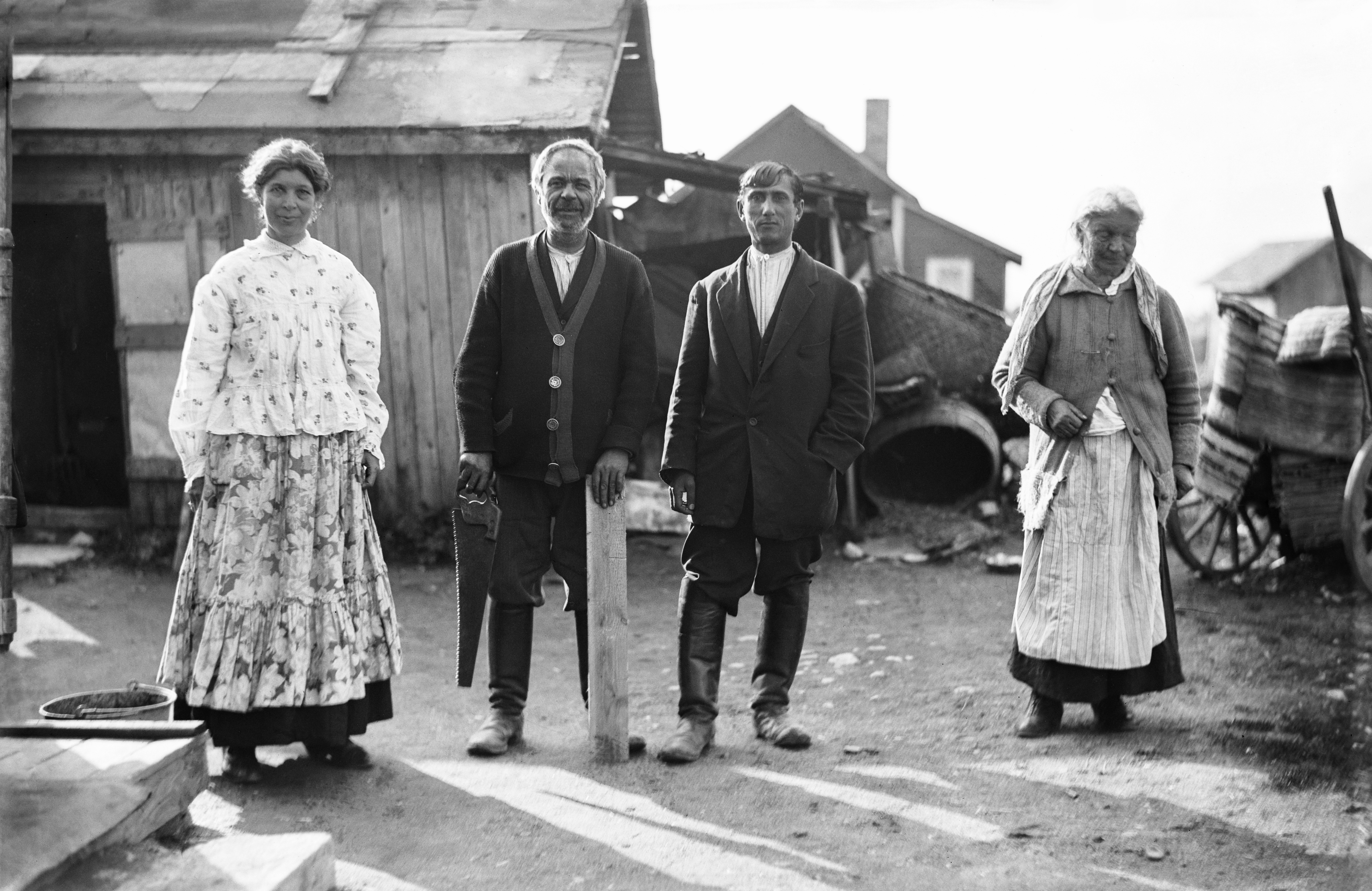
- Kaale in Malmi, Helsinki, 1930

Regions with significant populations
- Finland: 10,000
- Sweden: 4,500

Languages
- Finnish, Swedish and Finnish Romani

Religion
- Lutheran and Pentecostal Christianity

Related ethnic groups
- Laiuse Romani, Romanisael, Romanichal, Sinti, Manouche, Kale, Scottish Lowland Romani and other Romani peoples

The Finnish Roma (Romani: Kàlo; Finnish: Suomen romanit, kaaleet; Swedish: kalé-romer, finska romer), also known as the Kaale [ˈkɑː le], Finnish Romani, and Finnish Kale, are a Romani subgroup who live primarily in Finland but also in Sweden. Their main languages are Finnish, Swedish and Kalo.

The first recorded Roma arrived in Finland in the 16th century, and they primarily descend from the Romanisael. Although Finland does not collect data on individuals' ethnicity, the Finnish Roma population in Finland was estimated at 10,000 in 2004. In addition, approximately 4,500 Finnish Roma were residing in Sweden in 2020.

There are also Romani migrants from Romania and Bulgaria living in Finland, who should not be confused with the Finnish Roma, as the two groups are not closely related. They have primarily settled in southern Finland during the 21st century, with their population estimated at between 300 and 500.

== History ==
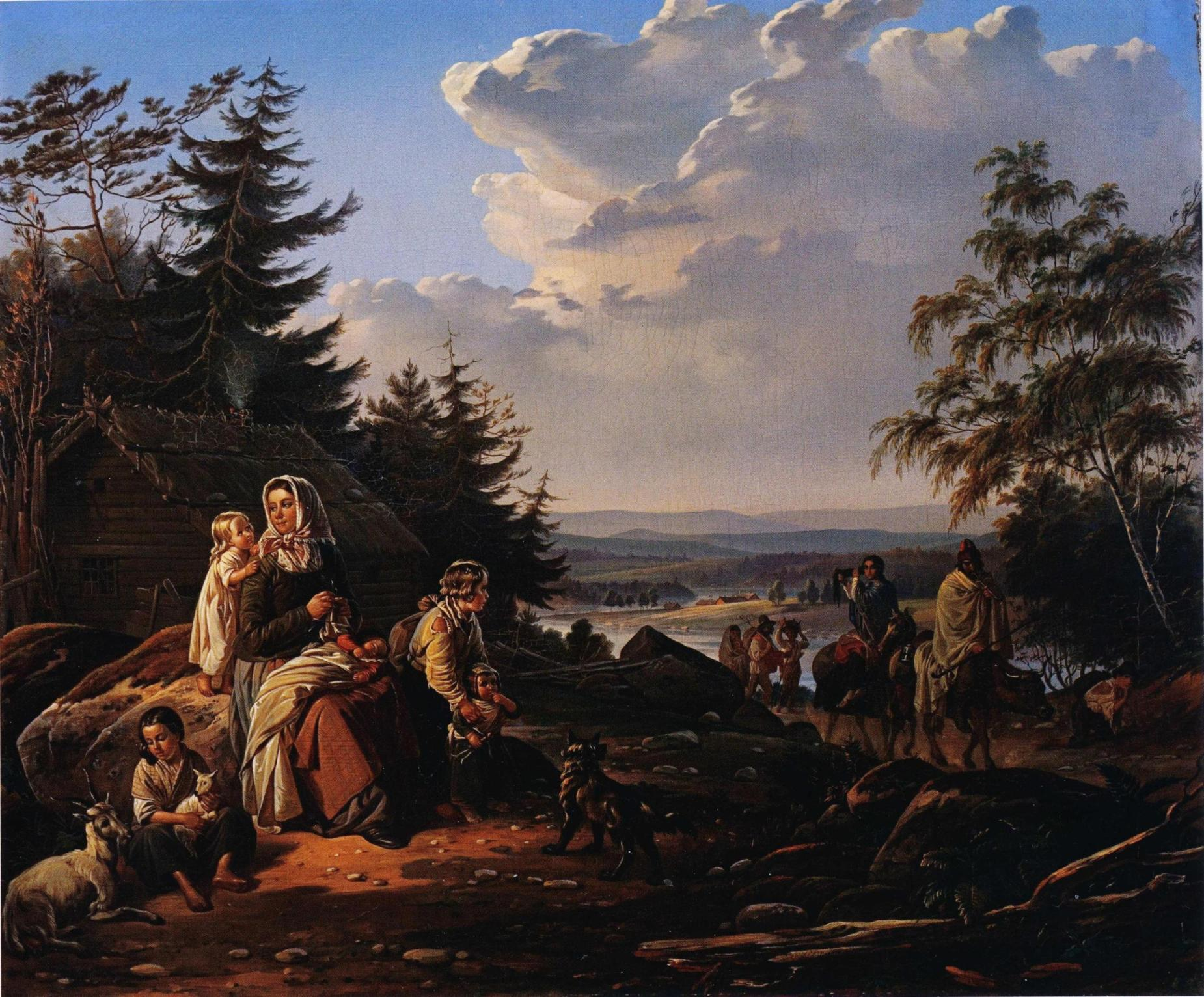
R. W. Ekman's Gypsy group 1849

=== From the 1500s to World War II ===
The first recorded Roma arrived in southwest Finland and Åland in the 16th century from the area that is now Sweden. The Finnish Kale primarily descend from the Romanisael who came to Finland via Sweden after being deported from Sweden in the 17th century. The ancestors of Finnish, Swedish and Norwegian Romani are English and Scottish Romani, who were deported from the kingdoms of Scotland and England.

In the Swedish part of the kingdom, "Tattares" are said to have arrived to Sweden and Stockholm for the first time in 1512, when people referred to as "Tattares" were traveling through the country. According to the minutes of the Stockholm city council, a group of about 60 people arrived in the city, reportedly from Little Egypt. The idea that the Roma came from Egypt was common in the stories of Roma groups traveling across Europe, which is also the origin of the English word Gypsies. The initial reception was friendly, but already during the reign of Gustav Vasa in the 1520s, the king aimed to expel the Roma from the kingdom. John III continued the same policy, ordering the "Tattares" to be driven into Norway and banning them from returning under threat of the death penalty. After the abolition of monasteries due to the Reformation, there were fears that itinerants would become a burden on state welfare. As foreigners, itinerants were also suspected of being spies for hostile powers.

The first known record of Roma in Finland dates from 1559, when the bailiff of Kastelholm Castle ordered the cessation of "inappropriate trading by Tattares" and their arrest. The next mention is from 1580, when a Tattare named Bågdan Bålatzen was reported to be imprisoned in Turku Castle. Four years later, in 1584, a total of 11 Tattare men were imprisoned due to complaints from peasants. The women and children of the group stayed outside the gate. In 1597, a Tattare group of about 100 people is known to have stayed in the province of Olavinlinna Castle.

==== 17th century ====
In the Kingdom of Sweden, a decree titled Placat om Tartarens fördrifwande af landet ("Proclamation on the Expulsion of the Tattares from the Country")—commonly known as the Hanging Law—was issued on 24 November 1637. It ordered all Roma to leave the country within a year and a day. After this deadline, Roma men found in the country could be hanged without trial, and women and children were to be driven beyond the kingdom's borders. The law used both the term "Tattare" and “sikeiner” (cf. zigenare), the latter becoming the more common term. Execution without trial conflicted with principles of the rule of law already present in Sweden, and the law was apparently never enforced. The execution provision was officially repealed only in 1748.

In practice, in Finland, for example, Governor-General Pietari/Per Brahe hired Tattares for construction work and tried in the 1660s to settle them near the eastern border in Pielisjärvi, where Roma were moved to cultivate abandoned farms and at the same time help defend the poorly protected border. Elements of the Karelian culture, such as traditional Karelian stew, remain part of Finnish Roma culture.

Life in the remote forests of Northern Karelia during years of crop failure proved impossible for the Roma, and they abandoned their settlements after a short time despite harsh threats. According to the Finnish National Agency for Education, the farms would have likely not been abandoned if the land had been arable or if the Roma had received the same support from the state as the pioneer settlers arriving in the area.

The Roma continued their nomadic lifestyle in Finland, practicing their own trades. Men earned their living mainly through horse trading and horse care, while women engaged in activities such as fortune-telling and bloodletting. Roma also served in the Swedish army. At least 15 Roma were listed in Gerhard Schantzenstierna's dragoon squadron inspected in 1676.

==== 19th century ====
The attitude of the Lutheran Church toward Roma was strictly negative: they were denied all church sacraments and healthcare, which had long been the responsibility of the Church. The Vagrancy Act of 1852 reinforced earlier practices and classified Roma as vagrants: Roma without protection were to be arrested immediately, brought before the governor, and sent to a labour house for an indefinite period. Men unfit for general work were to be sent to Crown fortresses, and women to Spinning Houses. Due to a lack of available labor institution space, the law could not be widely implemented. Between 1842 and 1861, an imperial decree was also in effect ordering that sons of Roma women placed in spinning houses be forcibly sent to Cantonist battalions in Tallinn and Pskov. The Vagrancy Act contained until 1883 a clause known as the "Gypsy paragraph," which effectively subjected Roma to harsher treatment than other vagrants.

==== From the turn of the 20th century through World War II ====
In early 20th-century rural Finland, nomadic Roma had established routes with farms where they regularly stayed overnight. In return, they helped with work on the farms. Men participated in field and forest work, while women helped with laundry, cleaning, cooking, and childcare. In addition, Roma traded horses, told fortunes, and sold handicrafts. Hosts were mostly modest rural people – smallholders, tenant farmers, and cottagers. Roma were also sometimes welcomed in rural parsonages. Wealthier landowners were generally more reluctant to host them. From the late 19th century, many Finnish municipalities began issuing regulations imposing heavy fines on households that accommodated Roma.

Roma sometimes slept outdoors in homemade tents while traveling. Their belongings often traveled with them by horse and cart. Roma generally stayed within or near their home parishes. The rural population came to know the Roma in their area and often treated them quite kindly. As they traveled, Roma relayed news to the majority population and thus served as important messengers of local events. Though Romani children often did not attend school because their families lacked permanent housing.

In 1895, the Finnish government established a committee to investigate the “Gypsy question.” Chaired by Reverend Alexander Gustaf Walle, the committee became known as the Walle Committee. Its resulting report, presented to the imperial Senate of Finland in 1900, focused on recommending how the Roma could be rapidly and effectively assimilated into the majority population. The committee felt that the Roma were unfit for agricultural work due to their physical and mental traits and instead suggested vocational training in handicrafts. However, its proposals were not implemented in practice.

From the early 1900s to the 1950s, much of the interest in Romani affairs in Finland was handled by the religious missionary organization Gypsy mission, founded in 1906 by Oskari Jalkio, who also served as its long-time chairman, originally, Oskari Jalkio intended to go do missionary work in East Asia, but when a young Roma boy, close to freezing, came to ask him for a coat, he realized that there was enough need for help in Finland, and founded the Gypsy Mission. Like the Walle Committee, he believed the only way to improve the Roma's status in Finland was to assimilate them into the majority. From the outset, the mission's ideology emphasized the “problematic” position of Romani children. According to Jalkio, Romani mothers taught their daughters to steal, tell fortunes, and beg, while fathers taught their sons to drink and trade horses. The organization's main goal for decades was to remove Romani children from their "unfit" parents and raise them to become "respectable" members of society. Researcher Martti Grönfors, who studies Finnish Roma, stated that the mission largely ignored Roma culture and needs and described the organization's attitude as “benevolently patronizing.”

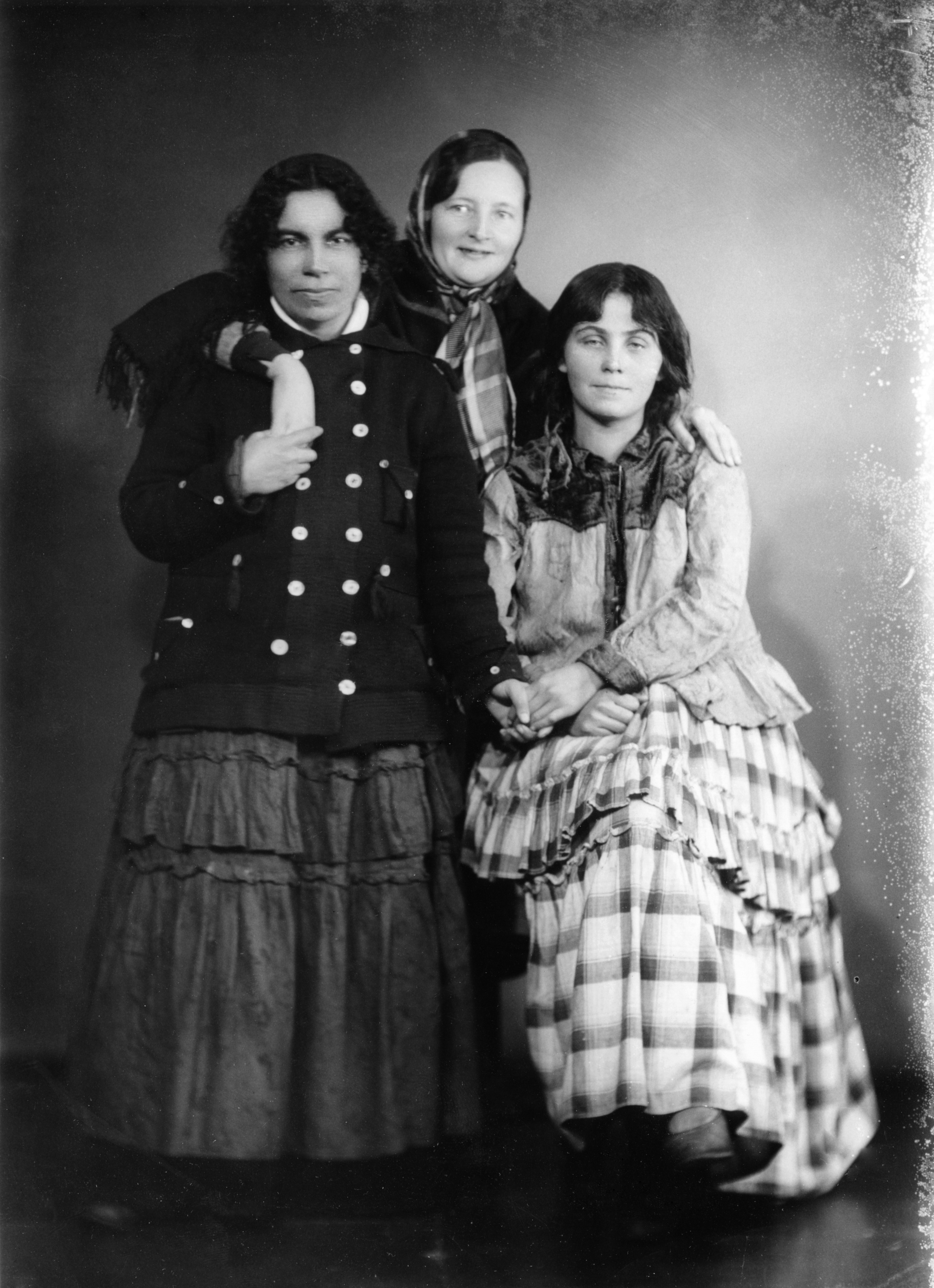
Three Roma women photographed in Helsinki in the 1930s.

During the wars of 1939–1945, at least 300 Romani men served in the military, with at least 60 killed. Many of these veterans later reported experiencing a level of equality on the front lines that was otherwise rare in Finland both before and after the wars.

During the Continuation War, a project was initiated in Finland by the Ministry of the Interior's Central Board for the Care of Evacuees under the leadership of Urho Kekkonen. The goal was to force Roma into employment. In 1943, Parliament passed a special labor camp law, which effectively meant the establishment of forced labor camps for Roma. The law was justified by the perceived increase in Roma vagrancy and associated criminal threats. At least one such camp was established in Lappajärvi, where men were assigned to cut and strip logs and float timber in streams. Romani men labeled "work-shy" by authorities were placed in a vagrants’ camp in Kihniö during the Continuation War, while a separate camp for Romani women was established in Vieremä.

=== After World War II ===
==== Major changes ====
By the late 1930s, over a thousand Finnish Roma lived in the Karelian territory that would soon be been annexed by Russia in the aftermath of the Winter War. Like the 430,000 other Karelian residents, the Roma from the region had to be evacuated to other parts of Finland due to the war. Evacuated Roma from the Karelian Isthmus mostly spread throughout Southern Finland, while many of those who left from the area around Sortavala and northern Ladoga Karelia settled in municipalities in Savo and North Karelia.

After the wars, evacuated Roma suffered severe housing shortages in many areas. As a result, communities inhabited by Roma sprang up on the outskirts of Finnish cities, where living conditions were often poor. Many evacuated Roma ended up in the Helsinki metropolitan area, living in makeshift tents and spruce shelters in Espoo's Mäkkylä forest and in Helsinki in barracks and old train cars near Malmi and Puistola. Elsewhere in Finland, “gypsy ghettos” formed near cities like Lappeenranta, Kuusankoski, and Pori. In the 1950s, authorities began assigning Roma dilapidated wooden houses that were slated for demolition. This housing misery led to health and social issues for the Roma and deepened their social exclusion. Some Roma in the capital region managed to slightly improve their living standards in the 1950s by finding employment in ports, factories, and construction sites in Helsinki.

Municipal authorities and local residents in many places tried to prevent Roma arriving from elsewhere from settling in good-quality rental housing in their area. A state committee addressing the “Gypsy question” between 1953 and 1955 claimed that the Roma were largely to blame for their own housing issues due to their “unsuitable lifestyle and lack of cleanliness.” Roma who had received housing were forcefully and unlawfully evicted by their neighbors in, for example, Kemijärvi (1951), Vehmersalmi and Huittinen (1955), and Pankakoski in Pielisjärvi (1956).

Soon after the war, state actors began proposing the removal of Romani children from their communities. Traditional Romani life was seen as spiritually and economically decayed, and harmful to children. Large numbers of Romani children were placed in orphanages, where they were raised according to mainstream norms. These children were isolated from their parents and pressured to abandon their culture. It is estimated that one in two Romani children spent time in orphanages at some point between the 1950s and 1980s.

After the war, Finnish agriculture began to mechanize, reducing the need for traditional rural labor. The use of money increased, and barter systems lost their importance. The rapid restructuring of Finland's economy in the 1950s and 1960s led to large-scale migration from rural areas to cities. This also undermined traditional Romani occupations, forcing many Roma to move to growth centers in search of livelihood. For many, this marked the end of a centuries-long nomadic lifestyle. As barter declined, interaction between the majority population and Roma decreased, and mutual attitudes became increasingly negative.

The 1969 book Gypsy Life described the transformation over the previous two decades as follows:

Tractors have killed the horse trade, factory goods have replaced women's handicrafts, the flood of plastic bowls has made tinkers and tin-smiths obsolete, pig gelders and castrators have lost their markets, fortune-telling is no longer profitable when newspapers are full of horoscopes. [– –] The Gypsies' own economic structure has become unnecessary. Economic independence is lost. [– –] Without basic education, lacking professional skills, even literacy, the Gypsies are not competitive in our rapidly industrialized, education-focused society.

In this new reality, obtaining housing and employment in Finland was made harder for Roma by the strong prejudices of the majority population. Consequently, large numbers of Finnish Roma began migrating to Sweden in the 1960s and 1970s, where they experienced better housing, job opportunities, and social security than in Finland. Sweden's broader internationalism and tolerance created a more favorable environment. Finnish Roma there faced far fewer obstacles in finding work and many found jobs especially in industry, construction, and services.

In Finland, Roma housing and livelihood conditions began to improve gradually during the 1960s alongside the development of the welfare state. However, meaningful improvement in housing did not occur until the 1970s. A 1972 national report still listed common Romani dwellings as old train cars, kiosks, cars, condemned shacks, basements, and storage or shed buildings.

==== Social mobilization ====
From the late 1960s onwards, Finnish Roma began participating in national Romani policy by demanding equality and addressing the group's social issues in society. This new Romani policy emerged as a counter-reaction to traditional assimilationist policies—new activists rejected the idea that Roma should only be passive subjects of intervention. They also opposed the religious justifications behind such measures and the dominant role played by religious organizations led by non-Roma, such as the Mission to the Gypsies (now Romano Missio) and the advisory board on Gypsy Affairs.

The Finnish Romani Association (originally the Finnish Gypsy Association), founded in 1967, began working to improve Roma conditions while respecting the cultural characteristics of the Romani population. The organization demanded better living conditions without forced assimilation. Its core goals included bridging the gap between Roma and mainstream society via mutual communication, reforming attitudes among both groups, and preserving valuable Romani traditions. The association contributed significantly to late 1960s and early 1970s studies that highlighted poor living conditions and offered solutions. It was also instrumental in pushing through a housing law for Roma, passed by Parliament in 1975, and monitored the enforcement of the 1970 anti-discrimination law.

In the 1980s, Finnish Romani policy underwent a major shift: demands to preserve and promote Romani language and culture became central. Finland's engagement with European human rights discourse around 1990 shifted Romani policy rhetoric from social problems to human rights. In the late 2000s, a liberal trend emphasizing individual freedoms among Roma also entered the policy scene.

==== Today ====
Although Roma in Finland today have the same rights and responsibilities as other citizens, their societal position still requires improvement. Ongoing challenges include housing, livelihood, and education. Since the 2010s, health education has also become a focus. Overall, the condition of Finland's Romani population has significantly improved in all areas of life since the early 1990s.

== Culture ==
=== Dress ===
The traditional female Kaale dress stems from the traditional dress worn by the ethnic Finn women. Until the turn of the 20th century, Kaale and Finn women dressed much alike in blouses, long skirts, and waist aprons. Over time and with increased wealth, the female Kale dress has become continually more decorated. The dress features a heavy full-length black velvet skirt worn relatively high at the waist, supported by padding, and a puffed blouse, often with prominent ruffles and lace, made of decorative cloth such as with sequins or a metallic sheen.

=== Music ===
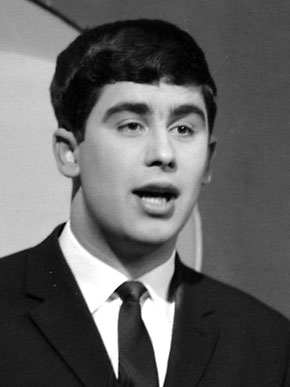
Taisto Tammi in 1960

Music is a central part of Kaale culture, everyday entertainment and domestic life. In Finland, the Kaale are known especially for their contribution to the Finnish tango and Schlager music. Kaale men have been a vital part of the Schlager scene since the start of the genre's popularity in Finland following World War II. At first Kaale singers faced direct discrimination, and for instance were banned from performing at certain establishments either on principle or following Kaale audience misbehavior. Taisto Tammi and Markus Allan were the two most important early Kaale performers; both adopted artistic aliases to reduce attention to their ethnic background.

== Perceived problems of the Kaale in Finland ==
=== Socioeconomic status ===
The Kaale have traditionally held positions as craftsmen, but the occupation has lost its importance in modern times, leading to a significant rise in unemployment within the group. A paper published by the Ministry of Labour states that "According to labour administration's client register material, 70% of the Roma jobseekers had a primary school or lower secondary school education." According to the same paper: "Education is compulsory in Finland and this obligation applies equally to the Roma as to other citizens, but dropping out of basic education is still common among young Roma, while in the mainstream population it is extremely uncommon."

=== Issues ===
In 2007, police officer and boxer Riku Lumberg (of Romani heritage) wrote an open letter to his own people, seeking an end to the "barbaric tradition of blood feud" in the community. Romani artist Kiba Lumberg has said the following about the culture she grew up in: "Blood feud and the violence that exists in Roma culture can't be discussed in Finland. We can't accept that some groups hide behind culture to excuse stepping on human rights and freedom of speech," and "the problem is, that when a Gypsy dares to speak in public about the negative things happening in their own tribe, they face death threats. If a white person opens their mouth, they're accused of racism."

== Finnish Romani in Sweden ==
From the 1950s, Finnish Romani have moved to Sweden, mainly due to better job opportunities and less discrimination. Around 4,500 Finnish Romani live in Sweden. They are the only Romani group in Sweden who wear their traditional dress. In Sweden it is easier for Finnish Romani to get a job and an apartment due to more Swedish sounding surnames as well as a long tradition of multiculturalism in Sweden.

== Notable people of Kaale descent ==
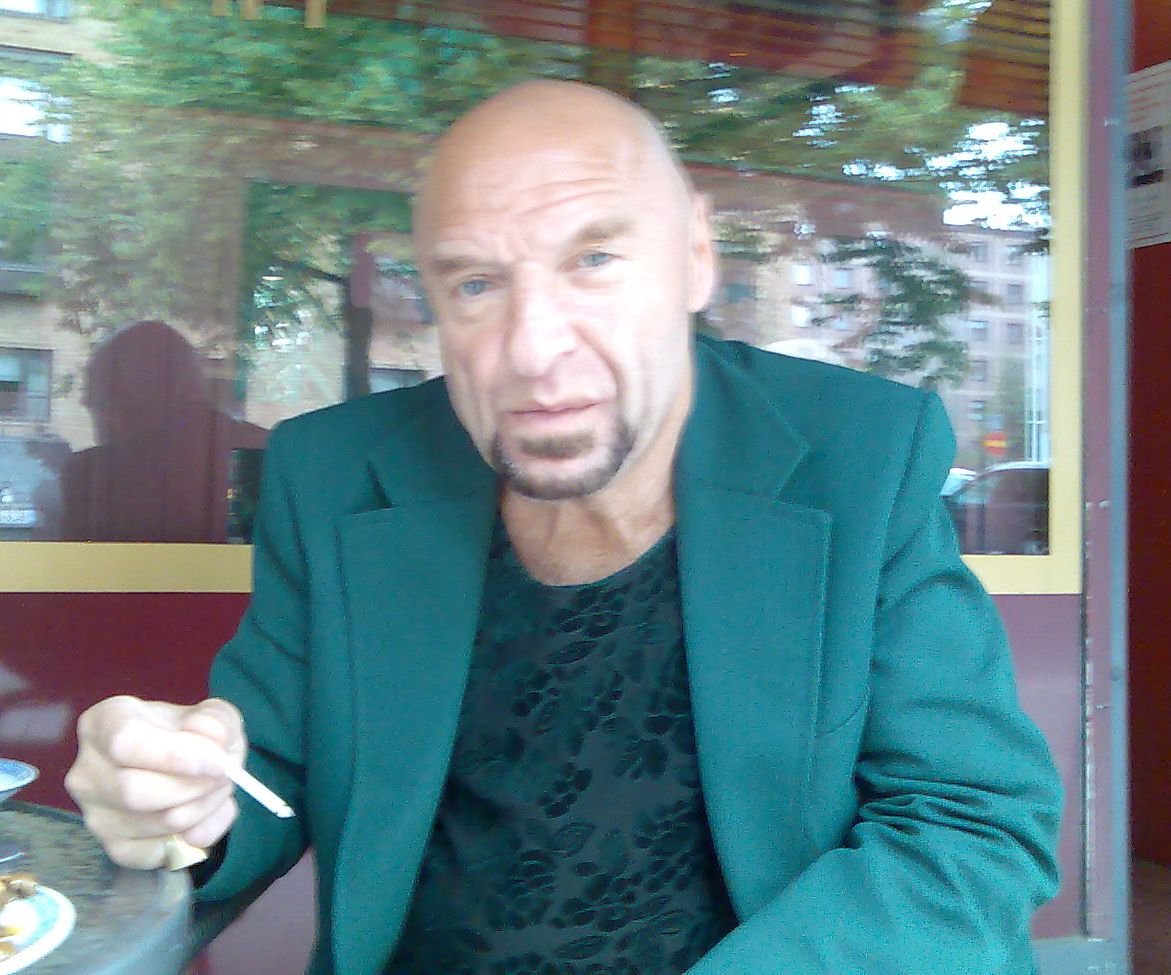
Remu Aaltonen

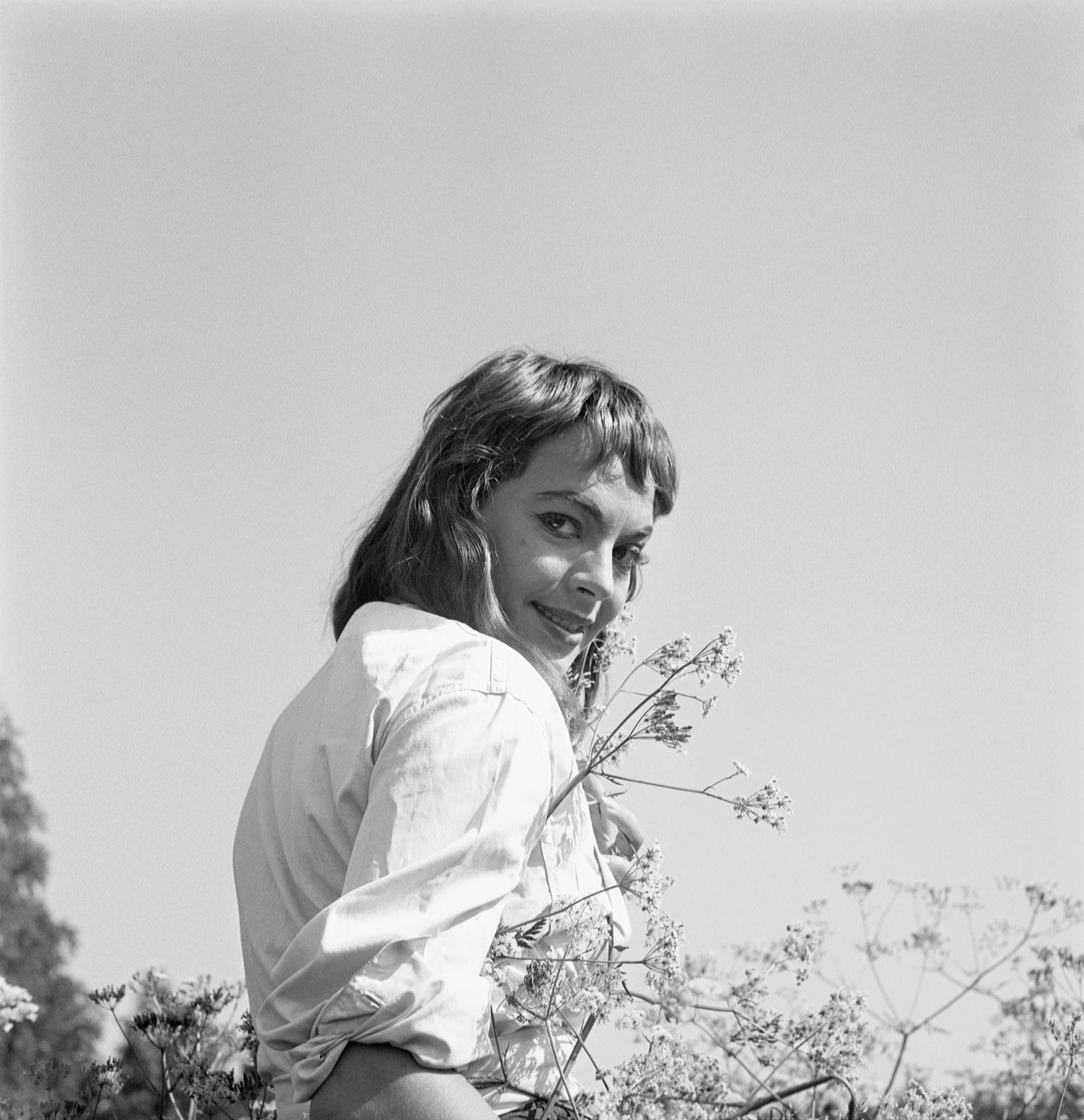
Anneli Sauli, 1957

- Remu Aaltonen, drummer and singer
- Veijo Baltzar, author and director
- Jasmine, singer
- Kiba Lumberg, author, artist and critic of violence in Roma culture
- Amadeus Lundberg, singer, Tango King
- Mirella, singer
- Anneli Sauli, actress
- Miranda Vuolasranta, activist and educator

== See also ==
- Kale (Welsh Roma)
- Romanichal
- Romanisael (Swedish and Norwegian Roma)
- Scottish Romani and Traveller groups
- Laiuse Romani language
- Irish Travellers
- Romani diaspora
- Romani people in Sweden
- Romani people in Finland
