= Romani people in Latvia =

Ethnic group in Latvia

Romane manusha andi Latvia (Romani)

Total population
- 7,456 (2017)

Regions with significant populations
- Riga and Ventspils

Languages
- Baltic Romani, Latvian

Religion
- Lutheranism

Related ethnic groups
- Romani people in Lithuania, Romani people in Estonia, Romani people in Belarus

Romani people in Latvia represent one of the country's oldest ethnic minorities. These include the Loftitke and Xaladytka subgroups, which have lived in Latvia since ancient times. According to the Office for Citizenship and Migration Affairs, there were 7,456 Romani people living in Latvia as of 2017, comprising 0.3% of the total population. However, they continue to suffer from discrimination by ethnic Latvians.

According to the latest extensive survey "Roma in Latvia", the data reveals that nearly half of the Roma individuals interviewed (49.3%) responded negatively when asked about their ethnicity recorded in their passports. Additionally, 12.9% admitted that another nationality is stated, while only 36.5% acknowledged themselves as Roma in their passports. Out of all the officially registered Roma individuals, 94.4% hold Latvian citizenship, and approximately 70% of them are fluent in Latvian. Furthermore, a significant majority of Roma consider the Romani language as their mother tongue.

According to the Council of Europe, approximately 5,600 Romani people live in Latvia (0.3% of the population).

During German occupation of Latvia during World War II, 3,800 Romani people were killed in Latvia by the Nazis.

== See also ==
- The Holocaust in Latvia
