= Demographics of Spain =

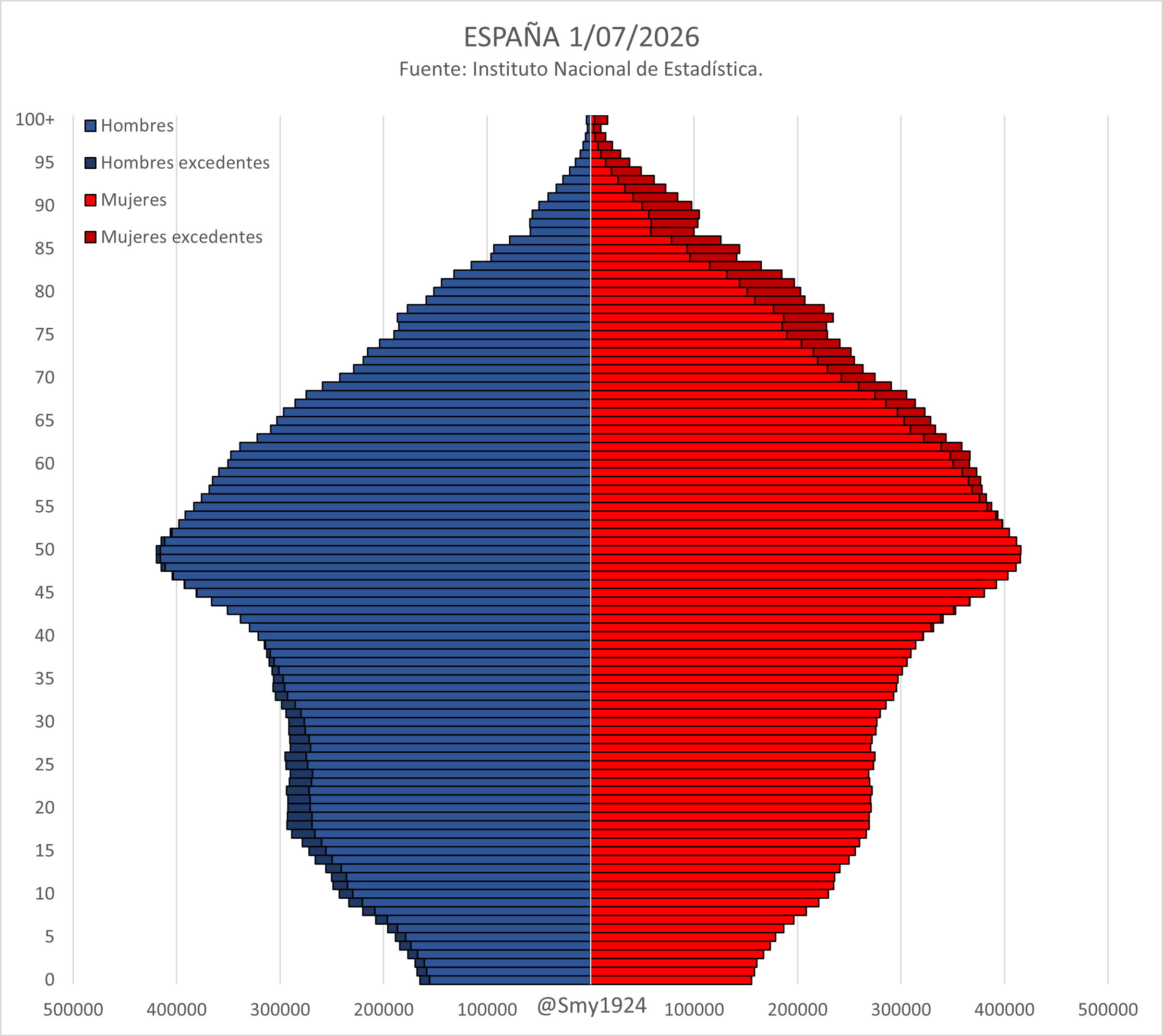
- Population pyramid of Spain in 2026
- Population: ▲49,935,642 (1 October 2026)
- Density: 98/km^{2} (253.8/sq mi)
- Growth rate: ▲0.90% (2026)
- Birth rate: ▼7.67 births per 1,000 people/ (2026)
- Death rate: ▼8.9 deaths/1,000 people (2024)
- Life expectancy: ▲84.05 years (2025)
  - male: 81.47 years
  - female: 86.53 years
- Fertility rate: ▼1.10 children per woman (2024)
- Infant mortality: ▼2.4 deaths/1,000 live births (2024)
- Net migration rate: 4.1 migrant(s)/1,000 population (2024)
- Immigrant share: 20.9% (2026)

Age structure
- 0–14 years: ▼12.6% (2025 est.)
- 15–64 years: ▼65.7% (2025 est.)
- 65 and over: ▲21.6% (2025 est.)

Sex ratio
- Total: 0.95 male(s)/female (2024)
- At birth: 1.05 male(s)/female
- Under 15: 1.06 male(s)/female (2024)
- 15–64 years: 1.00 male(s)/female (2024)
- 65 and over: 0.77 male(s)/female (2024)

Nationality
- Nationality: Spanish citizen
- Major ethnic: 81.3% White European (Note: This includes responses identified with terms that fall under the “White” category. These include Blanco/a (White, 79.0%), Español/a (Spaniard, 1.3%), Europeo/a (European, 0.4%), Caucásico/a (Caucasian, 0.3%) and Gentilicio de su comunidad autónoma (Demonym of their autonomous community, 0.3%).)
- Minor ethnic: 7.8% Latin American; 1.6% Mixed; 1.3% Romani; 1.0% Arab (Note: This includes responses identified as Magrebí (Maghrebi) or Árabe (Arab).); 0.3% Black; 6.7% not stated

Language
- Official: Spanish

Historical population of Spain

Historical population
Year	Pop.	±% p.a.
0	4,600,000	—
500	4,000,000	−0.03%
1000	4,000,000	+0.00%
1300	7,500,000	+0.21%
1500	6,500,000	−0.07%
1600	8,500,000	+0.27%
1700	8,000,000	−0.06%
1833	12,286,941	+0.32%
1846	12,162,872	−0.08%
1857	15,464,340	+2.21%
1877	16,622,175	+0.36%
1887	17,549,608	+0.54%
1900	18,616,630	+0.46%
1910	19,990,669	+0.71%
1920	21,388,551	+0.68%
1930	23,677,095	+1.02%
1940	26,014,278	+0.95%
1950	28,117,873	+0.78%
1960	30,582,936	+0.84%
1970	33,956,047	+1.05%
1981	37,683,363	+0.95%
1991	38,872,268	+0.31%
2001	40,847,371	+0.50%
2011	46,815,916	+1.37%
2021	47,400,798	+0.12%
2026	49,596,499	+0.91%
Source: INE and Our World in Data

As of 1 October 2026, Spain had a total population of 49,935,642. Spain's population surpassed 49 million inhabitants for the first time in 2025. Its population density, at 97 inhabitants per square kilometre (250/sq mi), is much lower than other Western European countries, yet, with the exception of microstates, it has the highest real density population in Europe, based on density of inhabited areas. With the notable exception of Madrid, Spain's capital city, the most densely populated areas lie around the coast, though recent immigration has contributed to a modest population growth in the inland.

The population of Spain doubled during the twentieth century, but the pattern of growth was extremely uneven due to large-scale internal migration from the rural interior to the industrial cities. Eleven of Spain's fifty provinces saw an absolute decline in population over the century. In the first 25 years of the 21st century, population of Spain grew from 40 million in 2000 to more than 49 million in 2025 mostly due to immigration.

In 2024, the average total fertility rate (TFR) across Spain was 1.10 children born per woman, one of the lowest in the world.

== History ==
Spain has an interesting demographic evolution in the last two centuries, reflecting the tumultuous history of Spain during the 19th and 20th centuries. In 1808–1814 the Peninsular War happened in Spain, causing 1 million deaths. Spain maintained a steady population growth after this war, though the economic stagnation of Spain resulted in a mass emigration to the Americas, mostly to the Spanish-speaking countries of the Americas, as approximately 3,5 million Spaniards moved to Latin America from 1850 to 1950. The Flu pandemic in 1918-19 left more than 200,000 dead in Spain.

The Spanish Civil War (1936–1939), which resulted in the establishment of a far-right dictatorship, resulted in the emigration of hundreds of thousands of Spaniards. Some 25,000 moved to Mexico The deepening of economic depression after 1939 resulted in mass emigration to European and American countries due to economic and political motives, with approximately 1 million people settling in Latin America. In 1941, the government approved benefits for large families with at least four children, and in 1945 approved a law allowing tax deductions for parents. The Spanish democratisation after 1975, resulted in return of some Civil War exiles, and after 1980 the birthrates declined as contraception and abortion were legalised. By 1988, after centuries of net negative migration, the first events of illegal immigration from Africa occurred, and in 1991 Spain became a net receiver of migrants after decades of mass emigration. In 1994 the government lowered threshold of requirements to become a large family: only three children needed.

The 2000s were characterised from a huge economic boom caused mainly by lower interest rates after adopting the Euro, resulting in the number of migrants skyrocketing from 924,000 in 2000 to 5,6 million in 2010, mostly from Africa, South America and Europe. Thus, Spain saw large-scale migration from its former colonies for the first time. Then, the economic crisis of Spain in 2008–2014 resulted in an emigration of hundreds of thousands of migrants. During the early 2000s, the mean year-on-year demographic growth set a new record with its 2003 peak variation of 2.1%, doubling the previous record reached back in the 1960s when a mean year-on-year growth of 1% was experienced. In 2005 alone, the immigrant population of Spain increased by 700,000 people. The arrival of migrating young adults was the main reason for the slight increase in Spain's fertility rate. From 2002 through 2008 the Spanish population grew by 8%, of whom 75% were foreign.

After 2018, the population began to grow again, thanks to the growth of immigration from abroad, despite negative fertility. Despite growing population, Spain is struggling with a declining population in rural areas (Empty Spain).

In 2020s, due to the Democratic Memory Law, which allowed hundreds of thousands of descendants of Civil War exiles to regain Spanish citizenship, many Latin Americans of Spanish descent obtained Spanish citizenship and some of them have moved to Spain. The 2020s have been characterised by a large growth of immigration in Spain, especially in provincial capitals and large cities. Since 2022, more than 1,6 million people have moved to Spain.

Spain has a low fertility rate of only 1,11 as of 2025. The number of births in Spain declined from 420,000 in 2015 to 321,000 in 2025. Though immigration has contributed to a small increase in the birthrates in 2025, the number of births to mothers under 25 years old in Spain is decreasing. Conversely, the share of births to mothers above the age of 40 has increased.

Also, due to the high immigration rates of Spain, many people are being naturalised every year. In 2025, 299,732 residents of Spain acquired the Spanish nationality, including 142,000 residents from South American countries.

== Population ==
View source data.
View source data.
View source data.

Note: Crude migration change (per 1,000) is a trend analysis, an extrapolation based on average population change (current year minus previous) minus natural change of the current year (see table vital statistics). Average population is an estimate of the population in the middle of the year and not at the end of the year.

View source data.

=== Population growth ===
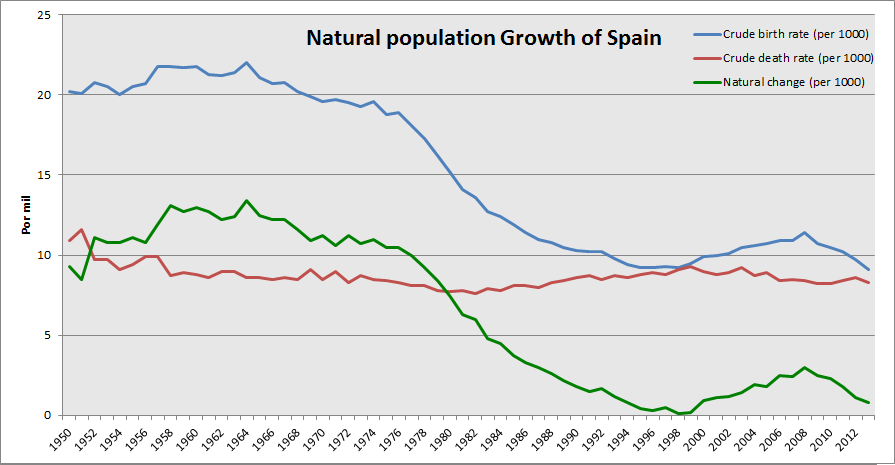
Birth and death rates and natural changes of Spain in 1950–2012.

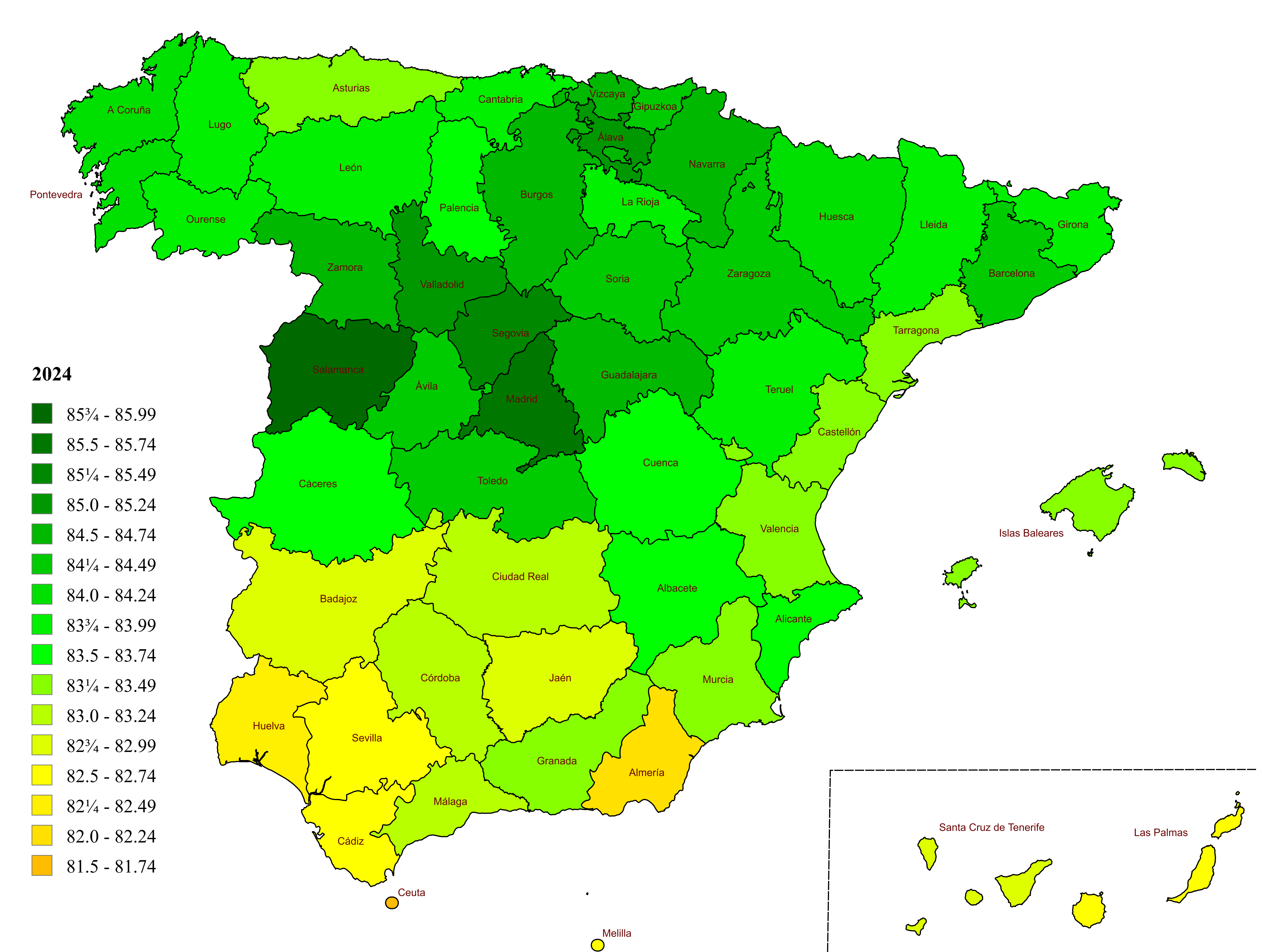
Provinces of Spain by life expectancy in 2024

Population growth rate

2022 est.
0.13%
Country comparison to the world
143rd
2017 est.
0.78%

=== Life expectancy ===
Development of life expectancy in Spain since 1908

1882–1950
Year	Life expectancy in years
1882	29.5
1892	32.1
1900	34.8
1908	41.3
1909	41.0
1910	40.8
1911	39.7
1912	43.4
1913	42.5
1914	42.8
1915	43.0
1916	42.9
1917	42.5
1918	30.3
1919	41.1
1920	39.2
1921	42.0
1922	44.1
1923	44.7
1924	46.2
1925	46.9
1926	47.7
1927	48.4
1928	48.6
1929	49.3
1930	49.3
1931	49.2
1932	51.1
1933	51.5
1934	52.3
1935	52.6
1936	51.0
1937	47.3
1938	47.6
1939	47.2
1940	48.4
1941	47.2
1942	52.5
1943	54.8
1944	56.2
1945	57.8
1946	57.5
1947	59.3
1948	61.2
1949	61.0
1950	61.8

Sources: Our World In Data and the United Nations.

1950-2015
Period	Life expectancy in years
1950–1955	64.6
1955–1960	67.8
1960–1965	69.9
1965–1970	71.4
1970–1975	72.7
1975–1980	74.4
1980–1985	76.1
1985–1990	76.9
1990–1995	77.6
2000–2005	79.9
2005–2010	81.2
2010–2015	82.5

Source: UN World Population Prospects

Life expectancy at birth

Total population
84.01 years (2024)
Male
81.38 years (2024)
Female
86.53 years (2024)

Infant mortality rate
3.14 deaths/1,000 live births (2021 est.)
Country comparison to the world
216th
Crude death rate
9.78 deaths/1,000 population (2021 est.)
Country comparison to the world
55th

=== Fertility ===
TFR of Spain over time to 2016

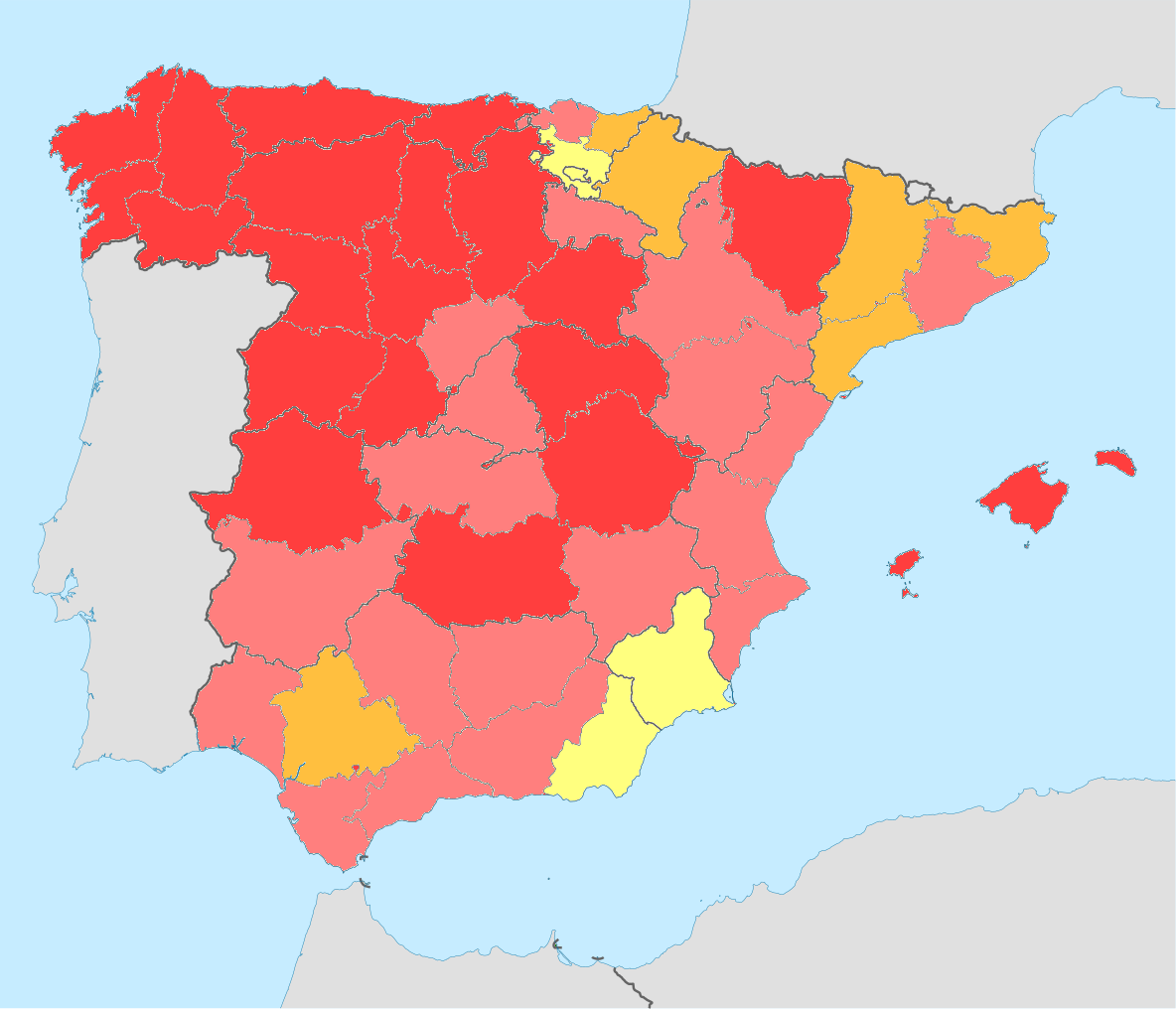
Spain total fertility rate by province (2014): 1.5–1.7; 1.4–1.5; 1.3–1.4; < 1.3

The total fertility rate is the number of children born per woman. It is based on fairly good data for the entire period. Sources: Our World In Data and Gapminder Foundation.

1850-1899
Year	Fertility rate
1850	5.13
1851	5.07
1852	5.01
1853	4.95
1854	4.89
1855	4.83
1856	4.78
1857	4.72
1858	4.66
1859	4.75
1860	4.86
1861	5.16
1862	5.09
1863	5
1864	5.19
1865	5.11
1866	5.07
1867	5.09
1868	4.72
1869	4.9
1870	4.84
1871	4.83
1872	4.83
1873	4.82
1874	4.81
1875	4.8
1876	4.79
1877	4.78
1878	4.78
1879	4.74
1880	4.7
1881	4.91
1882	4.79
1883	4.71
1884	4.86
1885	4.8
1886	4.86
1887	4.78
1888	4.82
1889	4.82
1890	4.55
1891	4.67
1892	4.71
1893	4.71
1894	4.6
1895	4.63
1896	4.75
1897	4.51
1898	4.41
1899	4.53

Crude birth rate
8.05 births/1,000 population (2021 est.)
Country comparison to the world
212th
Total fertility rate
1.16 children born/woman (2022) Country comparison to the world: 207th
Mother's mean age at first birth
30.9 years (2017 est.)

=== Age structure ===
0–14 years
15.02% (male 3,861,522/female 3,650,085)
15–24 years
9.9% (male 2,557,504/female 2,392,498)
25–54 years
43.61% (male 11,134,006/female 10,675,873)
55–64 years
12.99% (male 3,177,080/female 3,319,823)
65 years and over
18.49% (male 3,970,417/female 5,276,984) (2020 est.)

==== Structure of the population ====
Population Estimates by Sex and Age Group (01.I.2021) (Data refer to registered resident population.)
Age group	Male	Female	Total	%
0–4	989 957	936 296	1 926 253	4.06
5–9	1 182 657	1 111 874	2 294 531	4.84
10–14	1 310 725	1 227 805	2 538 530	5.36
15–19	1 259 328	1 178 983	2 438 311	5.14
20–24	1 228 307	1 164 436	2 392 743	5.05
25–29	1 283 969	1 247 891	2 531 860	5.34
30–34	1 373 686	1 371 909	2 745 595	5.79
35–39	1 588 932	1 607 493	3 196 425	6.74
40–44	1 949 687	1 935 067	3 884 754	8.20
45–49	1 982 307	1 949 746	3 932 053	8.30
50–54	1 847 825	1 852 726	3 700 551	7.81
55–59	1 688 389	1 740 775	3 429 164	7.23
60–64	1 464 713	1 552 291	3 017 004	6.37
65–69	1 187 562	1 303 094	2 490 656	5.25
70–74	1 024 938	1 190 297	2 215 235	4.67
75–79	791 421	990 173	1 781 594	3.76
80–84	533 545	773 766	1 307 311	2.76
85–89	366 344	630 406	996 750	2.10
90–94	140 288	309 931	450 219	0.95
95–99	30 128	86 008	116 136	0.25
100+	2 574	10 446	13 020	0.03
Total	23 227 282	24 171 413	47 398 695	100
Age group	Male	Female	Total	Percent
0–14	3 483 339	3 275 975	6 759 314	14.26
15–64	15 667 143	15 601 317	31 268 460	65.97
65+	4 076 800	5 294 121	9 370 921	19.77

Median age

Total
43.9 years
Male
42.7 years
Female
45.1 years (2020 est.)
Country comparison to the world
21st

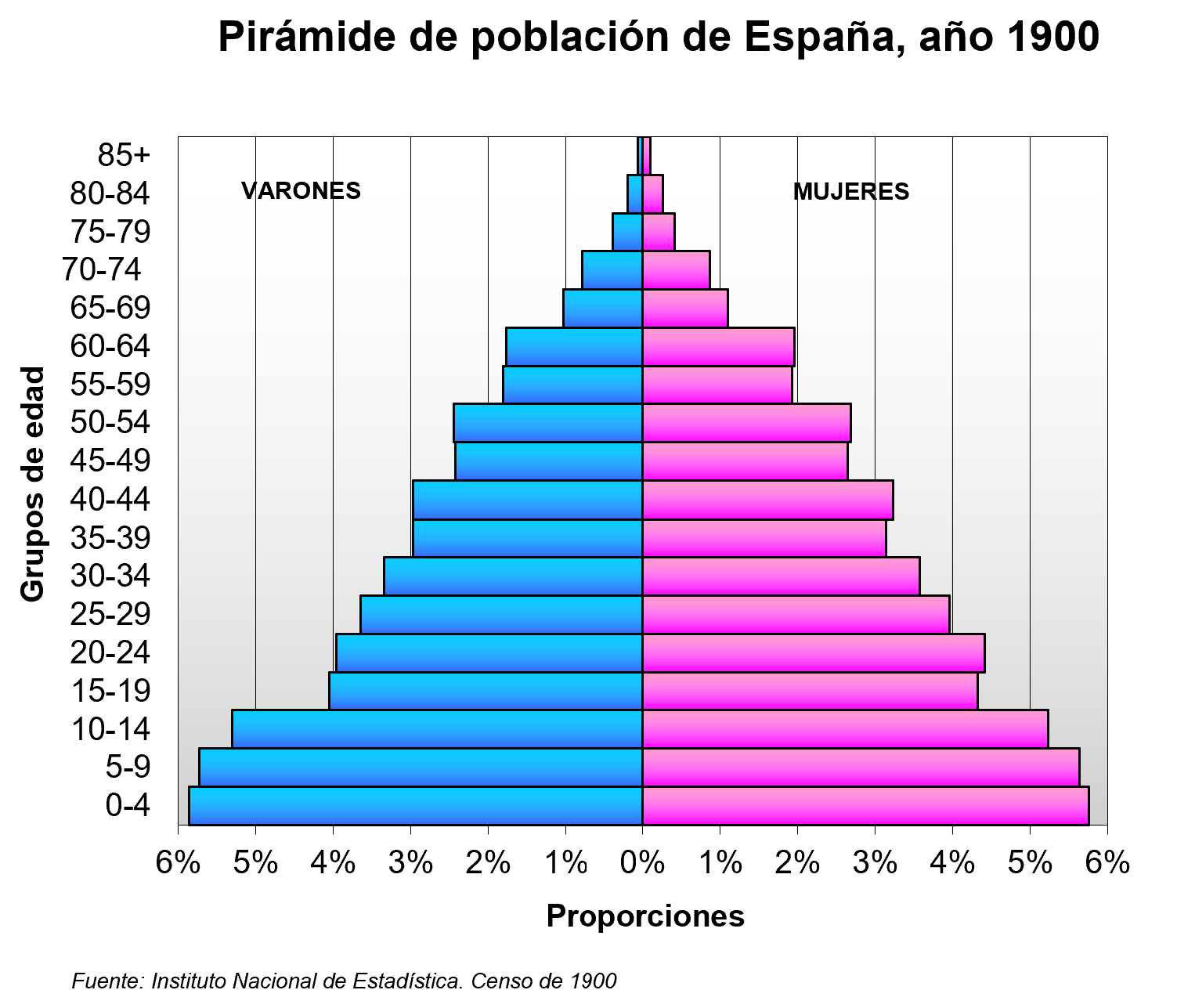
Population pyramid of Spain in 1900

Demographic evolution of Spain 1950–2014

Demographic evolution by age, sex and country of birth (Spain, Foreign) 2002-2021

== Vital statistics ==
=== Statistics since 1858 ===
Source: Instituto Nacional de Estadística (INE)

Notable events in Spanish demographics:

- 1865, 1885 – Major cholera outbreaks
- 1872–1876 – Third Carlist War
- 1873 – Cantonal Rebellion
- 1918–1920 – Spanish Flu
- 1936–1939 – Spanish Civil War
- 1940–1947 – White Terror
- 2020–2022 – COVID-19 Pandemic

Year	Average population (Note: 1 January)	Live births	Deaths	Natural change	Crude birth rate (per 1000)	Crude death rate (per 1000)	Natural change (per 1000)	Crude migration change (per 1000)	Total fertility rates (Note: In fertility rates, 2.1 and above is a stable population and has been marked blue, 2 and below leads to an aging population and the result is that the population decreases.)
1858	15,526,000	546,200	433,900	112,300	35.2	28.0	7.2		4.66
1859	15,584,000	559,000	449,000	110,000	35.9	28.8	7.1	-3.4	4.75
1860	15,642,000	573,500	429,000	144,500	36.7	27.4	9.3	−5.6	4.86
1861	15,699,000	611,600	417,800	193,800	39.0	26.6	12.4	−8.8	5.16
1862	15,754,000	607,100	430,700	176,400	38.5	27.3	11.2	−7.7	5.09
1863	15,809,000	598,100	461,700	136,400	37.8	29.2	8.6	−5.2	5.00
1864	15,864,000	621,500	499,500	122,000	39.2	31.5	7.7	−4.2	5.19
1865	15,920,000	614,900	538,600	76,300	38.6	33.8	4.8	−1.3	5.11
1866	15,976,000	611,700	463,700	148,000	38.3	29.0	9.3	−5.8	5.07
1867	16,032,000	624,200	487,200	137,000	38.8	30.4	8.4	−5.1	5.09
1868	16,088,000	579,600	548,700	30,900	35.9	34.1	1.8	1.6	4.72
1869	16,144,000	602,300	550,600	51,700	37.2	34.1	3.1	0.3	4.90
1870	16,201,000	598,300	512,200	86,100	36.8	31.6	5.2	−1.8	4.84
1871	16,258,000								4.83
1872	16,315,000								4.83
1873	16,372,000								4.82
1874	16,429,000								4.81
1875	16,487,000								4.80
1876	16,545,000								4.79
1877	16,603,000								4.78
1878	16,677,000	601,500	508,300	93,200	36.1	30.5	5.6	−1.2	4.78
1879	16,768,000	601,100	511,500	89,600	35.8	30.5	5.3	0.1	4.74
1880	16,859,000	598,200	507,300	90,900	35.5	30.1	5.4	0.0	4.70
1881	16,951,000	629,600	511,800	117,800	37.1	30.2	6.9	−1.5	4.91
1882	17,043,000	617,000	534,900	82,100	36.2	31.4	4.8	0.6	4.79
1883	17,136,000	610,700	559,600	51,100	35.6	32.7	2.9	2.5	4.71
1884	17,230,000	631,800	526,500	105,300	36.7	30.6	6.1	−0.7	4.86
1885	17,323,000	629,000	657,700	−28,700	36.3	38.0	−1.7	7.1	4.80
1886	17,418,000	638,200	509,600	128,600	36.7	29.2	7.5	−1.9	4.86
1887	17,513,000	631,800	573,400	58,400	36.1	32.8	3.3	2.1	4.78
1888	17,600,000	640,200	529,500	110,700	36.4	30.1	6.3	−1.4	4.82
1889	17,678,000	647,600	545,100	102,500	36.6	30.8	5.8	−1.4	4.82
1890	17,757,000	615,500	577,500	38,000	34.7	32.5	2.2	2.3	4.55
1891	17,836,000	632,900	566,000	66,900	35.5	31.7	3.8	0.7	4.67
1892	17,916,000	645,400	554,300	91,100	36.0	30.9	5.1	−0.6	4.71
1893	17,996,000	644,938	541,121	103,817	35.8	30.1	5.8	−1.3	4.71
1894	18,076,000	632,538	556,120	76,418	35.0	30.8	4.3	0.2	4.60
1895	18,151,000	636,130	527,192	108,938	35.1	29.1	6.0	−1.9	4.63
1896	18,238,000	654,796	539,145	115,651	35.9	29.6	6.3	−1.6	4.75
1897	18,320,000	625,249	520,165	105,084	34.1	28.4	5.7	−1.3	4.51
1898	18,402,000	612,288	518,750	93,538	33.3	28.2	5.1	−0.6	4.41
1899	18,454,000	632,588	533,109	99,479	34.3	28.9	5.4	0.7	4.53
1900	18,520,000	627,848	536,716	91,132	33.9	29.0	4.9	–1.4	4.49
1901	18,610,000	650,649	517,575	133,074	35.0	27.8	7.1	−1.2	4.71
1902	18,720,000	666,687	488,289	178,398	35.6	26.1	9.6	−4.8	4.70
1903	18,810,000	685,265	470,387	214,878	36.4	25.0	11.4	−2.4	4.68
1904	18,980,000	649,878	486,889	162,989	34.2	25.7	8.6	−1.8	4.67
1905	19,110,000	670,651	491,369	179,282	35.1	25.7	9.4	−2.1	4.66
1906	19,250,000	650,385	499,018	151,367	33.8	25.9	7.8	−1.0	4.61
1907	19,380,000	646,371	472,007	174,364	33.3	24.4	9.0	−1.3	4.57
1908	19,530,000	658,008	460,946	197,062	33.7	23.6	10.1	−2.9	4.52
1909	19,670,000	650,498	466,648	183,850	33.1	23.7	9.3	−4.2	4.48
1910	19,770,000	646,975	456,158	190,817	32.7	23.1	9.7	−0.6	4.43
1911	19,950,000	628,443	466,525	161,918	31.5	23.4	8.1	−3.6	4.39
1912	20,040,000	637,860	426,297	211,563	31.8	21.3	10.6	−4.1	4.35
1913	20,170,000	617,850	449,349	168,501	30.6	22.3	8.4	−1.5	4.30
1914	20,310,000	608,207	450,340	157,867	29.9	22.2	7.8	−1.9	4.26
1915	20,430,000	631,462	452,479	178,983	30.9	22.1	8.8	0	4.22
1916	20,610,000	599,011	441,673	157,338	29.1	21.4	7.6	−1.3	4.20
1917	20,740,000	602,139	465,722	136,417	29.0	22.5	6.6	1.6	4.19
1918	20,910,000	612,637	695,758	−83,121	29.3	33.3	−4.0	8.3	4.17
1919	21,000,000	585,963	482,752	103,211	27.9	23.0	4.9	1.3	4.16
1920	21,130,000	623,339	494,540	128,799	29.5	23.4	6.1	0.5	4.14
1921	21,270,000	648,892	455,469	193,423	30.5	21.4	9.1	2.2	4.08
1922	21,510,000	656,093	441,330	214,763	30.5	20.5	10.0	0.7	4.02
1923	21,740,000	662,576	449,683	212,893	30.5	20.7	9.8	1.7	4.02
1924	21,990,000	653,085	430,590	222,495	29.7	19.6	10.1	−2.4	3.92
1925	22,160,000	644,741	432,400	212,341	29.1	19.5	9.6	1.2	3.82
1926	22,400,000	663,401	420,838	242,563	29.6	18.8	10.8	−1.4	3.87
1927	22,610,000	636,028	419,816	216,212	28.1	18.6	9.6	1.7	3.70
1928	22,860,000	666,240	413,002	253,238	29.1	18.1	11.1	0.3	3.80
1929	23,120,000	653,668	407,486	246,182	28.3	17.6	10.7	−1.2	3.69
1930	23,340,000	660,860	394,488	266,372	28.3	16.9	11.4	−4.1	3.68
1931	23,510,000	649,276	408,977	240,299	27.6	17.4	10.2	6.3	3.58
1932	23,897,000	670,670	388,900	281,770	28.3	16.5	11.8	−2.4	3.64
1933	24,122,000	667,866	394,750	273,116	27.9	16.5	11.4	−2.0	3.59
1934	24,349,000	641,889	392,793	249,096	26.4	16.1	10.2	−0.8	3.38
1935	24,578,000	636,725	388,757	247,968	25.9	15.8	10.1	−0.7	3.31
1936	24,810,000	617,220	417,108	200,112	24.9	16.8	8.1	1.3	3.18
1937	25,043,000	568,977	475,310	93,667	22.7	19.0	3.7	5.7	2.89
1938	25,279,000	508,726	487,546	21,180	20.1	19.3	0.1	9.3	2.56
1939	25,517,000	422,345	472,611	−50,266	16.6	18.5	−2.0	11.4	2.12
1940	25,757,000	631,285	428,416	202,869	24.5	16.6	7.9	1.5	3.09
1941	25,999,000	511,157	487,748	23,409	19.7	18.8	0.9	8.5	2.47
1942	26,244,000	530,845	387,844	143,001	20.2	14.8	5.4	1.5	2.53
1943	26,491,000	606,971	352,587	254,384	22.9	13.3	9.6	−4.7	2.88
1944	26,620,000	602,091	349,114	253,796	22.6	13.1	9.5	−3.9	2.84
1945	26,770,000	621,558	330,581	290,977	23.2	12.3	10.9	−1.2	2.91
1946	27,030,000	585,381	353,371	232,010	21.7	13.1	8.6	−4.2	2.70
1947	27,150,000	588,732	330,341	258,391	21.7	12.2	9.5	6.8	2.67
1948	27,593,000	642,041	305,310	336,731	23.3	11.1	12.2	−4.3	2.88
1949	27,811,000	601,759	321,541	280,218	21.6	11.6	10.1	−3.0	2.68
1950	28,009,000	565,378	305,934	259,444	20.2	10.9	9.3	−1.2	2.45
1951	28,236,000	567,474	327,236	240,238	20.1	11.6	8.5	−0.1	2.47
1952	28,474,000	593,019	276,735	316,284	20.8	9.7	11.1	−2.7	2.51
1953	28,713,000	589,188	278,522	310,666	20.5	9.7	10.8	−2.4	2.55
1954	28,955,000	577,886	264,668	313,218	20.0	9.1	10.8	−2.4	2.59
1955	29,199,000	598,970	274,188	324,782	20.5	9.4	11.1	−2.7	2.62
1956	29,445,000	608,121	290,410	317,711	20.7	9.9	10.8	−2.4	2.66
1957	29,693,000	646,784	293,502	353,282	21.8	9.9	11.9	−3.5	2.69
1958	29,943,000	653,216	260,683	392,533	21.8	8.7	13.1	−4.7	2.72
1959	30,195,000	654,474	269,591	384,883	21.7	8.9	12.7	−4.1	2.74
1960	30,455,000	663,375	268,941	394,434	21.8	8.8	13.0	−3.5	2.77
1961	30,744,000	654,616	263,441	391,175	21.3	8.6	12.7	−2.2	2.79
1962	31,067,000	658,816	278,575	380,241	21.2	9.0	12.2	−1.7	2.8
1963	31,393,000	671,520	282,460	389,060	21.4	9.0	12.4	−1.9	2.88
1964	31,723,000	697,697	273,955	423,742	22.0	8.6	13.4	−2.9	3.01
1965	32,056,000	676,361	274,271	402,090	21.1	8.6	12.5	−2.0	2.94
1966	32,394,000	669,919	276,173	393,746	20.7	8.5	12.2	−1.7	2.91
1967	32,734,000	680,125	280,494	399,631	20.8	8.6	12.2	−1.7	2.85
1968	33,079,000	667,311	282,628	384,683	20.2	8.5	11.6	−1.1	2.86
1969	33,427,000	666,568	303,402	363,166	19.9	9.1	10.9	−0.4	2.87
1970	33,779,000	663,667	286,067	377,600	19.6	8.5	11.2	−3.5	2.88
1971	34,040,642	672,092	308,516	363,576	19.7	9.0	10.6	0.2	2.88
1972	34,408,338	672,405	285,508	386,897	19.5	8.3	11.2	0.2	2.86
1973	34,800,600	672,963	301,803	371,160	19.3	8.7	10.7	−1.6	2.84
1974	35,117,294	688,711	300,403	388,308	19.6	8.5	11.0	1.9	2.89
1975	35,569,375	669,378	298,192	371,186	18.8	8.4	10.5	0.1	2.75
1976	35,946,425	677,456	299,007	378,449	18.9	8.3	10.5	0.1	2.68
1977	36,329,199	656,357	294,324	362,033	18.1	8.1	10.0	0	2.59
1978	36,694,077	636,892	296,781	340,111	17.3	8.1	9.2	0.1	2.48
1979	37,035,719	601,992	291,213	310,779	16.2	7.8	8.4	0	2.36
1980	37,346,940	571,018	289,344	281,674	15.2	7.7	7.5	0.2	2.22
1981	37,635,389	533,008	293,386	239,622	14.1	7.8	6.3	0.2	2.09
1982	37,881,873	515,706	286,655	229,051	13.6	7.6	6.0	−0.5	1.96
1983	38,090,151	485,352	302,569	182,783	12.7	7.9	4.8	−0.5	1.84
1984	38,252,899	473,281	299,409	173,872	12.4	7.8	4.5	−0.4	1.73
1985	38,407,829	456,298	312,532	143,766	11.9	8.1	3.7	−0.5	1.64
1986	38,531,195	438,750	310,413	128,337	11.4	8.1	3.3	−0.5	1.56
1987	38,638,052	426,782	310,073	116,709	11.0	8.0	3.0	−0.6	1.50
1988	38,731,578	418,919	319,437	99,482	10.8	8.3	2.6	−0.8	1.45
1989	38,802,300	408,434	324,796	83,638	10.5	8.4	2.2	−0.9	1.40
1990	38,853,227	401,425	333,142	68,283	10.3	8.6	1.8	−1.1	1.36
1991	38,881,416	395,989	337,691	58,298	10.2	8.7	1.5	2.9	1.33
1992	39,051,336	396,747	331,515	65,232	10.2	8.5	1.7	3.7	1.32
1993	39,264,034	385,786	339,661	46,125	9.8	8.7	1.2	3.8	1.26
1994	39,458,489	370,148	338,242	31,906	9.4	8.6	0.8	3.8	1.21
1995	39,639,726	363,469	346,227	17,242	9.2	8.8	0.4	3.9	1.18
1996	39,808,374	362,626	351,449	11,177	9.2	8.9	0.3	3.8	1.17
1997	39,971,329	369,035	349,521	19,514	9.3	8.8	0.5	3.8	1.19
1998	40,143,449	365,193	360,511	4,682	9.2	9.1	0.1	3.9	1.15
1999	40,303,568	380,130	371,102	9,028	9.5	9.3	0.2	3.9	1.20
2000	40,470,182	397,632	360,391	37,241	9.9	9.0	0.9	3.9	1.23
2001	40,665,545	406,380	360,131	46,249	10.0	8.8	1.1	8.0	1.24
2002	41,035,271	418,846	368,618	50,228	10.1	8.9	1.2	18.1	1.26
2003	41,827,836	441,881	384,828	57,053	10.5	9.2	1.4	15.8	1.31
2004	42,547,454	454,591	371,934	82,657	10.6	8.7	1.9	15.7	1.33
2005	43,296,335	466,371	387,355	79,016	10.7	8.9	1.8	14.7	1.35
2006	44,009,969	482,957	371,478	111,479	10.9	8.4	2.5	15.1	1.36
2007	44,784,659	492,527	385,361	107,166	10.9	8.5	2.4	17.4	1.40
2008	45,668,938	519,779	386,324	133,455	11.4	8.4	3.0	9.6	1.46
2009	46,239,271	494,997	384,933	110,064	10.7	8.3	2.4	3.0	1.39
2010	46,486,621	486,575	382,047	104,528	10.5	8.2	2.3	1.6	1.38
2011	46,667,175	471,999	387,911	84,088	10.2	8.3	1.9	1.4	1.34
2012	46,818,216	454,648	402,950	51,698	9.7	8.6	1.1	−3.4	1.32
2013	46,712,650	425,715	390,419	35,296	9.1	8.3	0.8	-5.4	1.27
2014	46,495,744	427,595	395,830	31,765	9.1	8.5	0.6	−3.1	1.32
2015	46,384,379	420,290	422,568	−2,278	9.0	9.1	−0.1	0.8	1.33
2016	46,418,884	410,583	410,611	−28	8.8	8.8	0.0	1.7	1.34
2017	46,497,393	393,181	424,523	−31,342	8.4	9.1	−0.7	3.9	1.31
2018	46,645,070	372,777	427,721	−54,944	7.9	9.1	−1.2	7.0	1.26
2019	46,918,951	360,617	418,703	−58,086	7.6	8.8	−1.2	9.7	1.24
2020	47,318,050	341,315	493,776	−152,461	7.2	10.4	−3.2	5.0	1.19
2021	47,400,798	337,380	450,744	−113,354	7.1	9.5	−2.4	4.2	1.19
2022	47,486,727	329,251	464,417	−135,166	6.9	9.8	−2.9	15.5	1.16
2023	48,085,361	320,656	436,124	−115,468	6.7	9.1	−2.4	13.7	1.12
2024	48,630,010	318,005	436,118	−118,113	6.5	8.9	−2.4	11.6	1.10
2025	49,128,297	321,684	444,945	−123,261	6.5	9.1	−2.6	12.7	1.11
2026	49,596,499								

=== Current vital statistics ===
Period	Live births	Deaths	Natural increase
January—September 2025	238,286	338,698	–100,412
January—September 2026	241,647	338,037	–96,390
Difference	▲ +3,361 (+1.41%)	▼ –661 (−0.20%)	▲ +4,022

==== Birthplace of mothers ====
In 2025, 211,112 (65.6%) babies were born to Spanish-born mothers, 56,217 (17.5%) to Americas born mothers (North, Central and South America), 28,143 (8.7%) to African-born mothers, 17,931 (5.6%) to European-born mothers (all countries of Europe except for Spain), and 8,153 (2.5%) to Asian-born mothers.

Births by country of birth of the mother (2025)
Country	Births
Spain	211,112
Europe (excluding Spain)	17,931
Germany	820
Austria	54
Belgium	211
Bulgaria	761
Denmark	40
Finland	59
France	1,185
Ireland	124
Italy	1,302
Norway	39
Netherlands	394
Poland	589
Portugal	623
United Kingdom	1,075
Romania	4,797
Russia	1,237
Sweden	149
Switzerland	370
Ukraine	2,091
Rest of Europe	2,011
Africa	28,143
Morocco	21,373
Rest of Africa	6,770
America	56,217
Argentina	3,610
Bolivia	1,887
Brazil	2,735
Cuba	2,179
Chile	519
Colombia	12,976
Ecuador	4,532
United States of America	699
Peru	5,809
Uruguay	570
Venezuela	7,774
Rest of America	12,927
Asia	8,153
China	1,479
Pakistan	2,913
Rest of Asia	3,761
Foreign	110,572
National Total	321,684

==== Nationality of mothers ====
In 2025, 237,884 (73.9%) babies were born to mothers with Spanish nationality (including naturalized immigrants), 33,693 (10.5%) to mothers with an American nationality (North, Central, South America), 24,185 (7.5%) to mothers with an African nationality (including North Africa), 18,364 (5.7%) to mothers with a European nationality (both EU and non-EU countries of Europe), and 7,344 (2.3%) to mothers with an Asian nationality.

=== Total fertility rates by region ===
Total fertility rate (TFR) in Spain by Autonomous communities as of 2024:

2024
Autonomous communities	TFR
Melilla	1.36
Region of Murcia	1.32
Ceuta	1.26
Navarre	1.20
Castilla–La Mancha	1.19
Andalusia	1.18
La Rioja	1.16
Aragon	1.15
Valencian Community	1.14
Extremadura	1.13
Spain	1.10
Basque Country	1.10
Community of Madrid	1.09
Catalonia	1.08
Balearic Islands	1.08
Castile and León	1.07
Cantabria	0.99
Galicia	0.96
Asturias	0.95
Canary Islands	0.82

==== Total fertility rate by provinces and islands ====
2023
Provinces and Islands	TFR
El Hierro	0.75
Tenerife	0.79
La Gomera	0.81
Gran Canaria	0.83
La Palma	0.84
Ourense	0.91
Province of Zamora	0.92
Pontevedra	0.96
Cantabria	0.96
Menorca	0.97
León	0.98
Formentera	0.98
Fuerteventura	0.99
A Coruña	1.00
Salamanca	1.02
Lanzarote	1.02
Palencia	1.03
Illes Balears	1.05
Lugo	1.06
Province of Ávila	1.06
Barcelona	1.07
Mallorca	1.07
Málaga	1.08
Biscay	1.09
Soria	1.09
Madrid	1.10
Cáceres	1.10
Burgos	1.11
Valladolid	1.12
Segovia	1.13
Guadalajara	1.13
Province of Cuenca	1.14
Province of Valencia	1.14
Huesca	1.15
Province of Alicante	1.15
Cádiz	1.15
Huelva	1.15
Zaragoza	1.16
Ciudad Real	1.16
Albacete	1.17
Gipuzkoa	1.19
Badajoz	1.19
Andalucía	1.19
Jaén	1.19
Teruel	1.20
Granada	1.20
Girona	1.21
Tarragona	1.21
Álava	1.22
Province of Toledo	1.22
Province of Castellón	1.22
Province of Seville	1.23
Córdoba	1.24
Lleida	1.25
Almería	1.44

== Employment and income ==
Youth unemployment, ages 15–24
24.9% (total; as of January 2025)

== Metropolitan areas ==
Population density by municipality in Spain, 2018

Largest cities or towns in Spain National Statistics Institute (2025)
Rank	Name	Autonomous community	Pop.	Rank	Name	Autonomous community	Pop.
1	Madrid	Community of Madrid	3,477,497	11	Bilbao	Basque Country	350,975
2	Barcelona	Catalonia	1,713,247	12	Córdoba	Andalusia	324,159
3	Valencia	Valencian Community	841,558	13	Valladolid	Castile and León	301,798
4	Zaragoza	Aragon	699,007	14	Vigo	Galicia	295,735
5	Seville	Andalusia	688,714	15	L'Hospitalet	Catalonia	292,161
6	Málaga	Andalusia	597,173	16	Gijón	Principality of Asturias	271,259
7	Murcia	Region of Murcia	477,631	17	Vitoria-Gasteiz	Basque Country	260,402
8	Palma	Balearic Islands	443,196	18	A Coruña	Galicia	251,277
9	Las Palmas	Canary Islands	384,023	19	Elche	Valencian Community	245,575
10	Alicante	Valencian Community	365,586	20	Granada	Andalusia	235,294

=== Islands ===
Islander population (The surface of the islands will be given in hectares except for the largest islands of the Canary and Balearic archipelagos, as well as the Plazas de Soberanía.):

1. Tenerife 886,033
2. Mallorca 846,210
3. Gran Canaria 829,597
4. Lanzarote 132,366
5. Ibiza 113,908
6. Fuerteventura 94,386
7. Menorca 86,697
8. La Palma 85,933
9. La Gomera 22,259
10. El Hierro 10,558
11. Formentera 7,957
12. Arousa 4,889
13. La Graciosa 658
14. Tabarca 105
15. Ons 61

== Ethnic groups ==
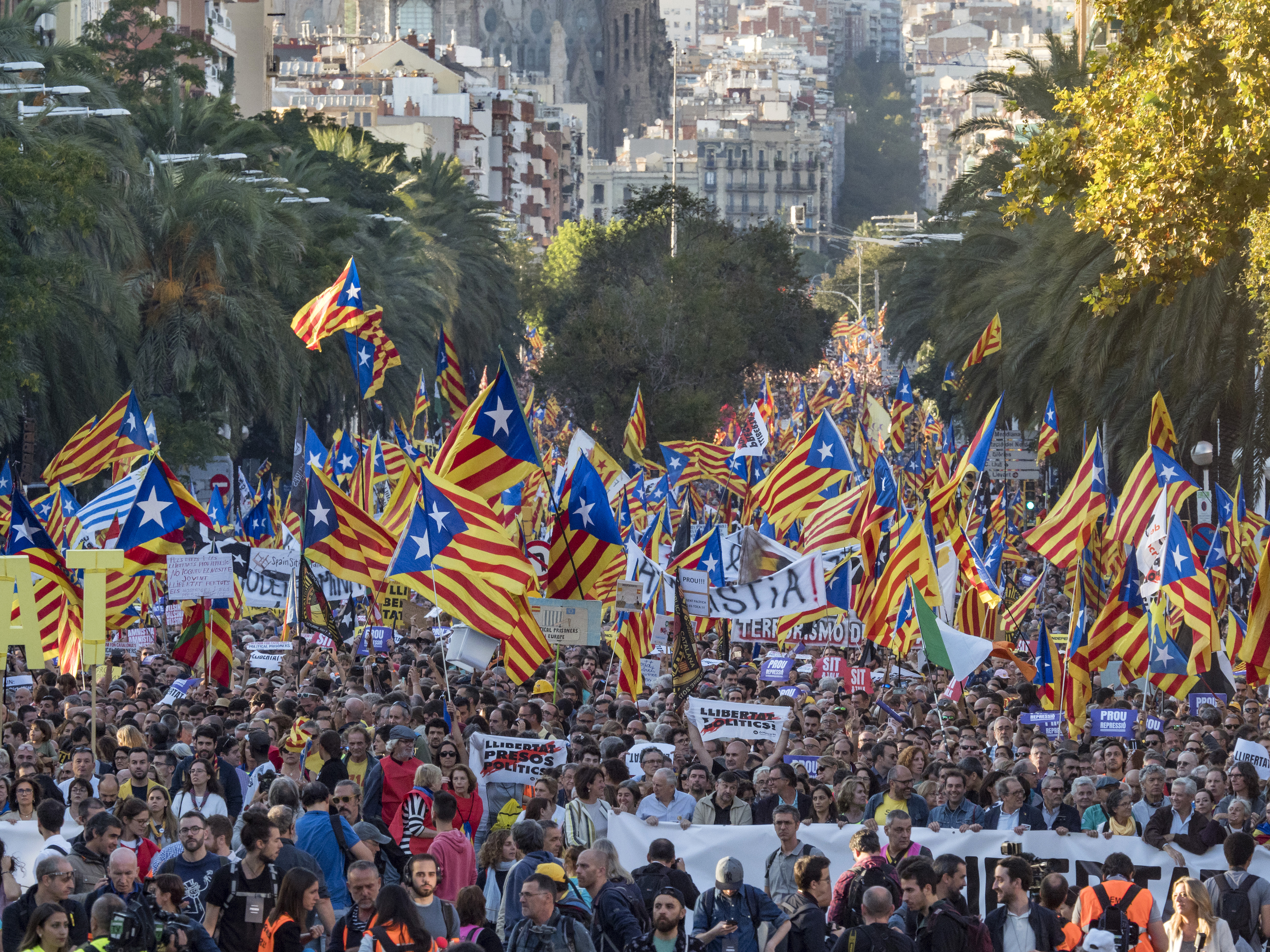
Catalan people in Barcelona in 2019

The Spanish Constitution of 1978, in its second article, generically recognises contemporary entities—nationalities and regions— (Note: The term 'nationality' (Spanish: nacionalidad) was chosen carefully in order to avoid the more politically charged term 'nation'.) within the context of the Spanish nation.

Spain has been described as a de facto plurinational state. The identity of Spain rather accrues of an overlap of different territorial and ethnolinguistic identities than of a sole Spanish identity. In some cases some of the territorial identities may conflict with the dominant Spanish culture. Distinct traditional identities within Spain include the Basques, Canarians, Catalans, Galicians, Andalusians and Valencians, although to some extent all of the 17 autonomous communities may claim a distinct local identity. Definition of ethnicity or nationality in Spain is fraught politically. The term "Spanish people" (pueblo español) is defined in the 1978 constitution as the political sovereign, i.e. the citizens of the Kingdom of Spain. The same constitution in its preamble speaks of "peoples and nationalities of Spain" (pueblos y nacionalidades de España) and their respective cultures, traditions, languages and institutions. The formerly nomadic Gitanos and Mercheros are distinctly marked by endogamy and discrimination but they are dispersed through the country.

The native Canarians are partly the descendants of the North African population of the Canary Islands prior to Spanish colonization in the 15th century although many Spaniards have varying levels of North African admixture as a result of the Islamic period. Also included are many Spanish citizens who are descendants of people from Spain's former colonies, mostly from Venezuela, Argentina, Dominican Republic, Ecuador, Peru, Colombia, Morocco and Cuba. There is also a sizable number of Spaniards of Eastern European, Maghrebian, Sub Saharan-African, Indian subcontinent and Middle Eastern descent.

The arrival of the gitanos (Spanish for "gypsies"), a Romani people, began in the 16th century; estimates of the Spanish Roma population range from 750,000 to over one million. There are also the mercheros (also called quinquis), a formerly nomadic minority group. Their origin is unclear.

Historically, Sephardic Jews and Moriscos are the main minority groups originating in Spain and with a contribution to Spanish culture. The Spanish government formerly offered Spanish citizenship to Sephardic Jews.

Racial group	2025	
Racial group	Number	%
White	39,961,000	81.3%
Latin American	3,834,000	7.8%
Multiracial	786,000	1.6%
Gypsy or Roma	639,000	1.3%
Maghrebi or Arab	491,000	1.0%
Black	147,000	0.3%
Asian	49,000	0.1%
Other	491,000	1.0%
not stated	2,801,000	5.7%
Total	49,315,949	100

== Immigration ==
In terms of emigration vs. immigration, after decades of net emigration after the Spanish Civil War, Spain has experienced massive large-scale immigration for the first time in modern history over the past 30 years. As 1 October 2026, there were 10,433,091 foreign-born people in Spain, making up to 20.89% of the Spanish population Of these, 7,518,237 (15.06%) didn't have Spanish citizenship. This makes Spain one of the world's preferred destinations for migrants, being the 4th country in Europe by immigration numbers and the 10th worldwide. Of these, more than 860,000 were Romanian, and 760,000 were Moroccan while the number of Ecuadorians was around 390,000. Colombian population amounted to around 300,000. There are also significant numbers of British (359,076 as of 2011, but more than one million are estimated to live permanently in Spain) and German (195,842) citizens, mainly in Alicante, Málaga provinces, Balearic Islands and Canary Islands. The largest Asian immigrant group, the Chinese, number slightly over 166,000.

Foreign born and Spain born population pyramids

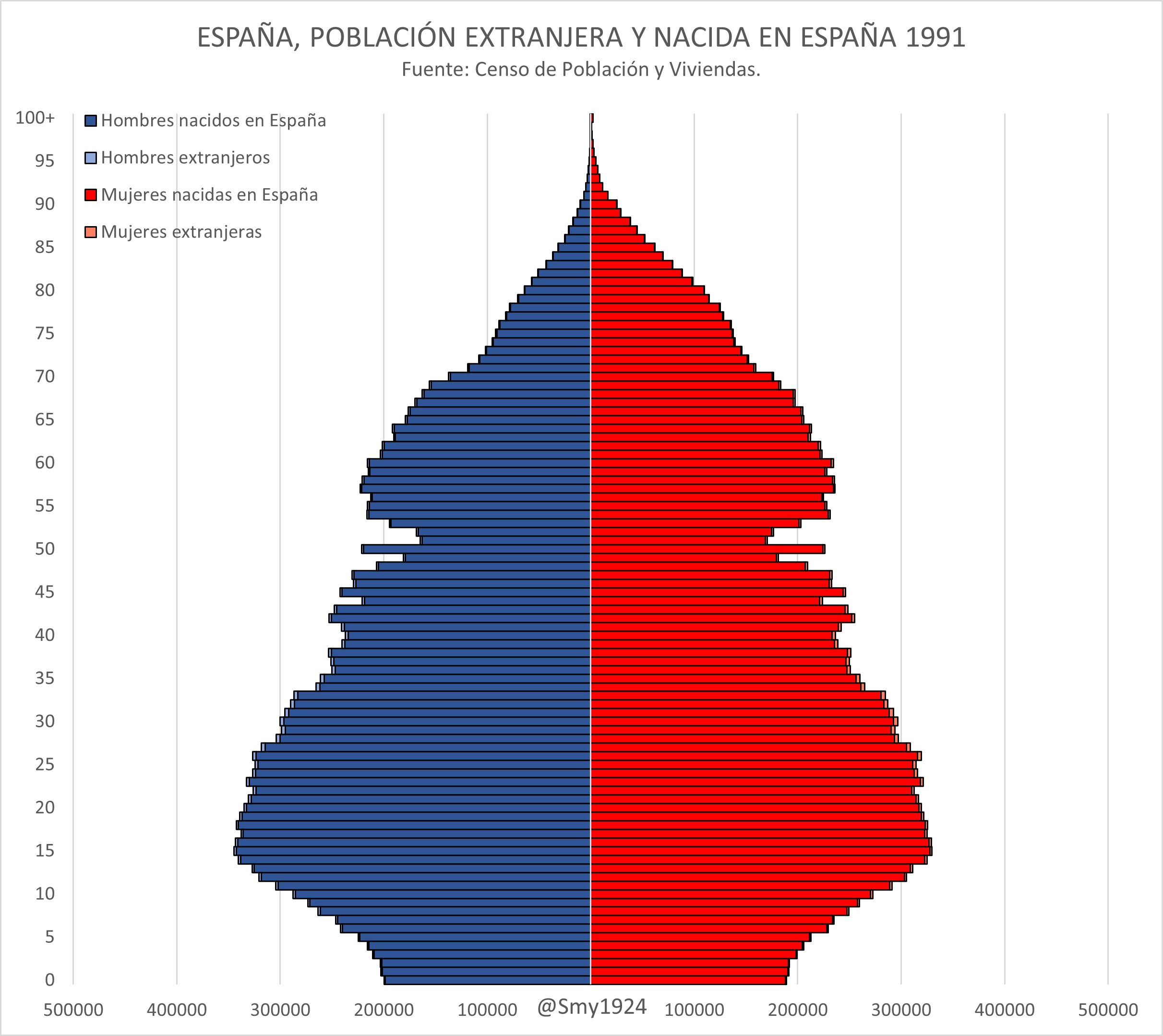
1991

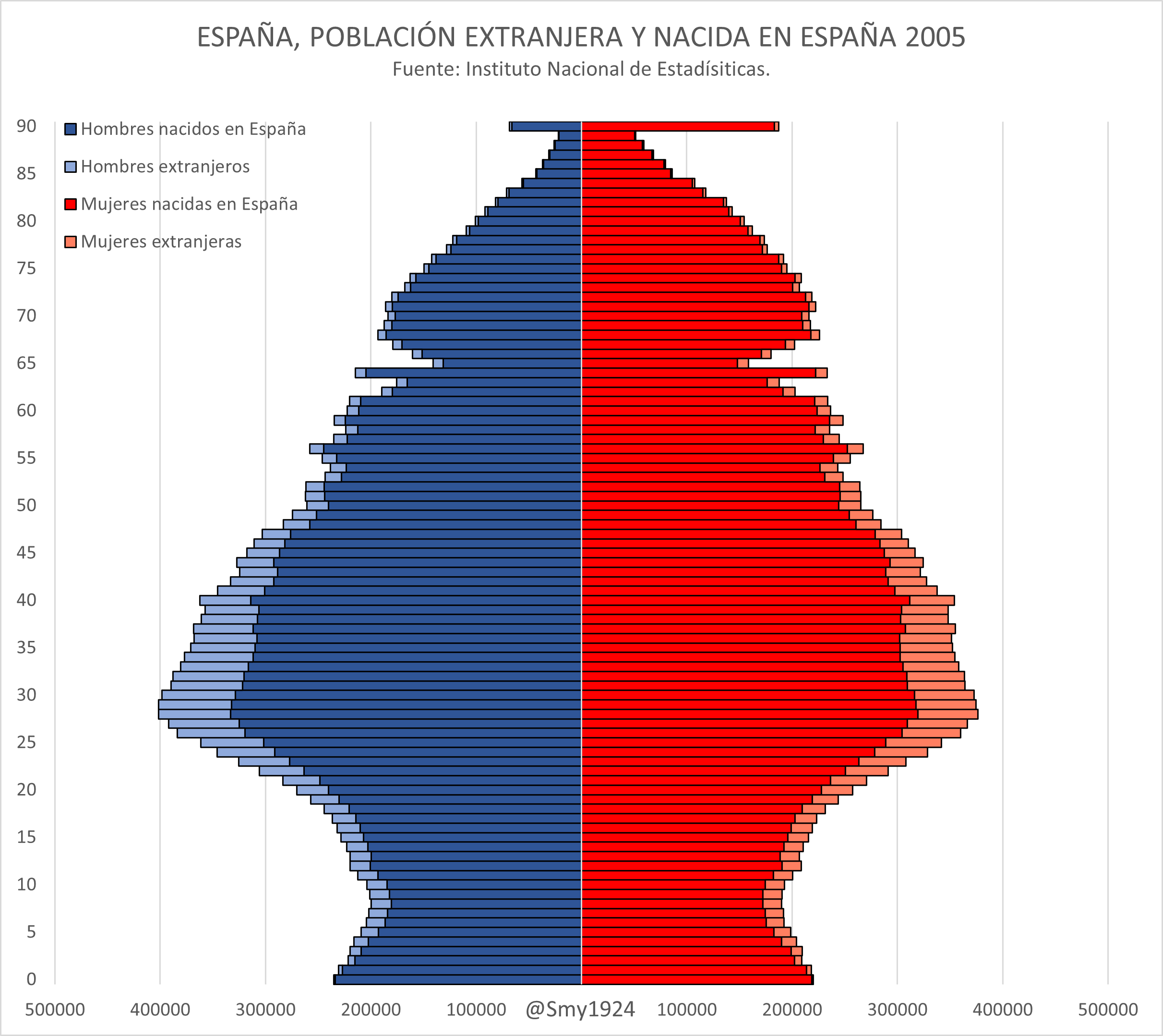
2005

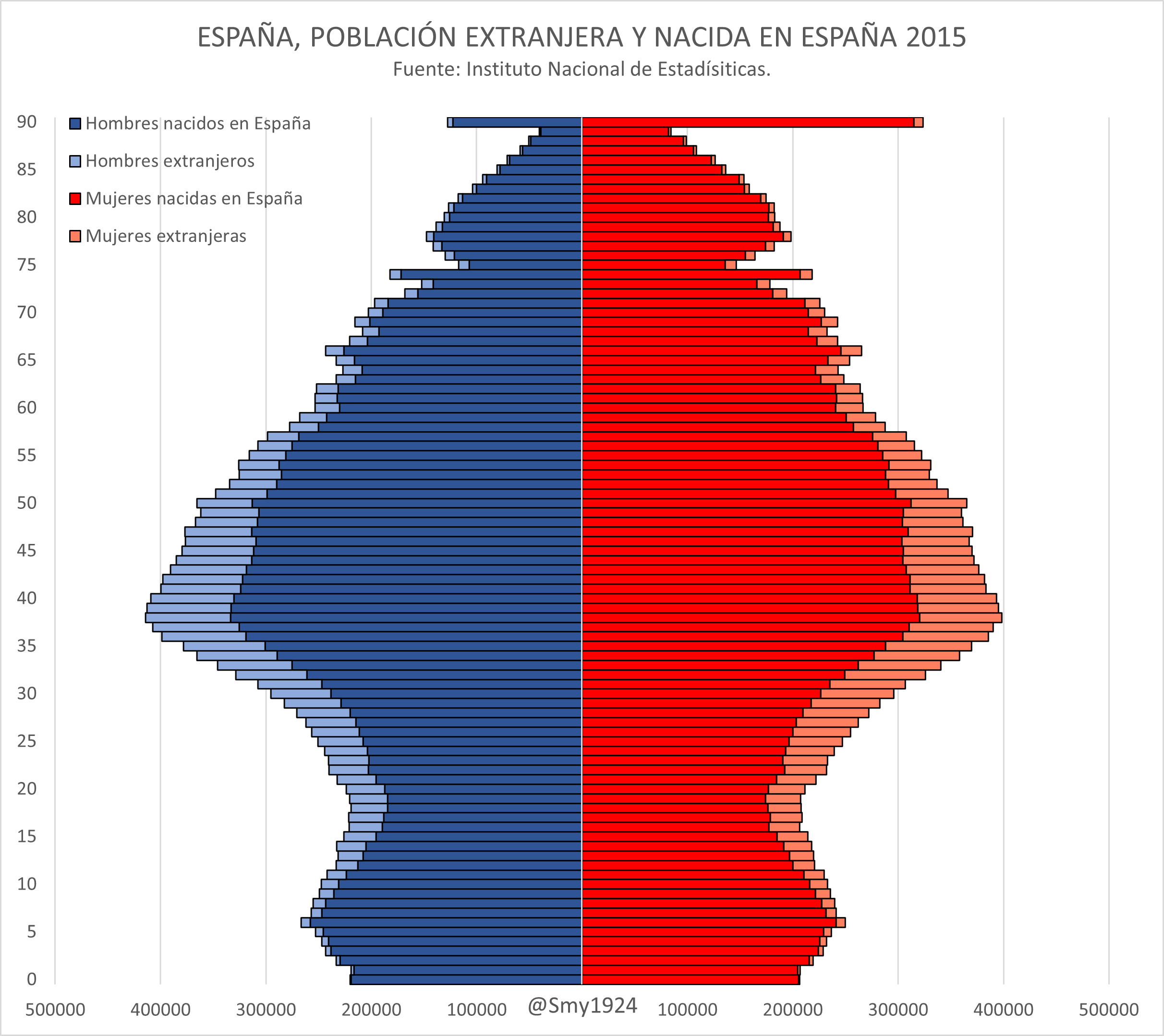
2015

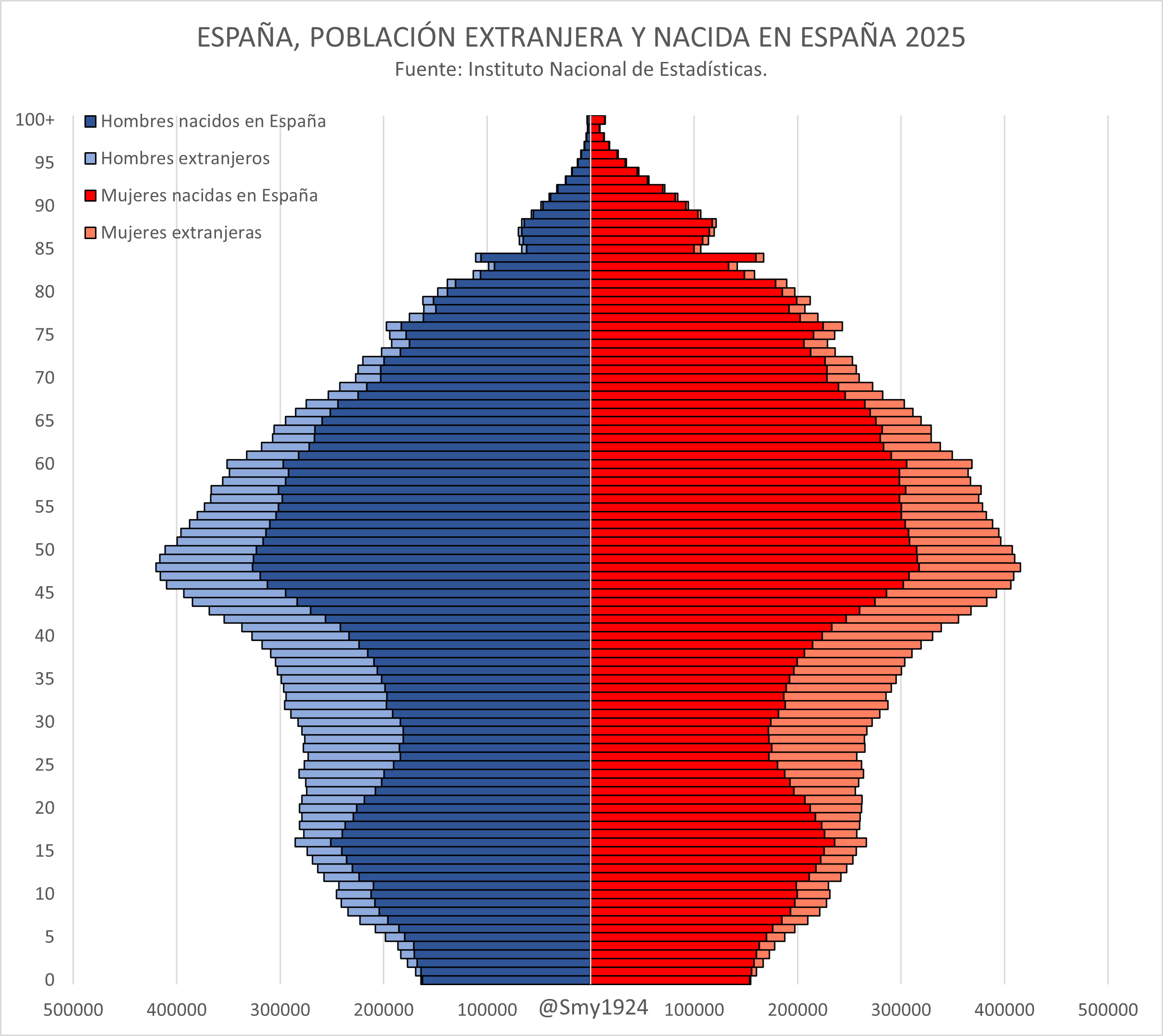
2025

=== Spain migration data, 2008–2022 ===
Period	Immigration	Emigration	Net Migration
2008S1	329,772	134,650	195,121
2008S2	269,302	153,782	115,520
2009S1	205,091	184,140	20,951
2009S2	187,872	195,978	−8,106
2010S1	173,714	197,032	−23,318
2010S2	186,990	206,347	−19,357
2011S1	176,808	200,634	−23,826
2011S2	194,527	208,400	−13,873
2012S1	153,205	212,457	−59,253
2012S2	150,849	234,148	−83,299
2013S1	127,796	269,691	−141,895
2013S2	152,976	262,612	−109,636
2014S1	138,274	199,552	−61,278
2014S2	167,180	200,877	−33,698
2015S1	154,659	173,062	−18,404
2015S2	187,455	170,812	16,643
2016S1	186,918	166,819	20,098
2016S2	227,829	160,505	67,323
2017S1	234,070	197,140	36,930
2017S2	298,062	171,720	126,342
2018S1	286,230	169,124	117,106
2018S2	357,454	140,402	217,052
2019S1	349,941	137,367	212,574
2019S2	400,539	158,881	241,658
2020S1	248,029	130,413	117,616
2020S2	219,889	118,148	101,741
2021S1	201,329	197,376	3,953
2021S2	327,527	183,410	144,117
2022S1	478,990	220,443	258,547

Migration data for Spain (2021–2024)
Year	Total immigration	Total emigration	Total net migration	Spanish immigration	Spanish emigration	Spanish net migration
2021	887,960	696,866	191,094	135,651	155,533	−19,882
2022	1,258,894	531,889	727,005	138,420	141,124	−2,704
2023	1,250,991	608,695	642,296	152,963	126,901	26,062
2024	1,288,562	662,294	626,268	144,335	137,719	6,616

Population by country of birth as of 1 January 2025:
Country	Population
Spain	39,664,087
Morocco	1,165,955
Colombia	978,041
Venezuela	692,316
(European Union) Romania	521,181
Ecuador	468,751
Argentina	450,883
Peru	430,277
United Kingdom	281,584
Cuba	252,290
Honduras	220,593
(European Union) France	219,791
Ukraine	209,592
China	209,320
Dominican Republic	207,135
Bolivia	193,275
Brazil	189,712
(European Union) Germany	180,264
(European Union) Italy	164,380
Paraguay	162,633
Russia	141,438
Pakistan	135,696
Senegal	109,523
Algeria	103,935
(European Union) Bulgaria	101,578
(European Union) Portugal	96,773
Nicaragua	93,905
Uruguay	91,437
Mexico	87,575
Chile	82,165
USA	76,180
India	73,951
(European Union) Netherlands	62,007
Philippines	60,756
Switzerland	60,164
(European Union) Belgium	56,924
(European Union) Poland	56,656
El Salvador	40,811
Mali	38,855
Nigeria	34,793
Gambia	31,753
Equatorial Guinea	26,649
Bangladesh	25,883
Moldova	25,171
Ghana	23,953
Georgia	23,510
(European Union) Sweden	23,082
Guatemala	21,248
(European Union) Ireland	20,959
Guinea	15,873
(European Union) Lithuania	15,677
Iran	15,467
Armenia	15,055
Mauritania	13,909
(European Union) Hungary	13,770
Syria	12,888
(European Union) Finland	11,684
Norway	10,774
Belarus	10,640
Turkey	10,435
Canada	10,425

=== Foreign population ===
Percentage of people of foreign origin over two generations under the age of 15 in Spain

As of 1 January 2025, Spain had a foreign citizens population of 6,911,971. The largest groups of foreign citizens were those of Moroccan, Colombian, Romanian, Venezuelan and Italian citizenship. Meanwhile, as 1 January 2025, Spain had a foreign-born population of 9,464,210, being those born in the Americas the largest group, and Europe being the second most common continent of origin after South America.

Foreign-born population by region of origin	Number
Americas	4,772,270
South America	3,739,859
Central America/Caribbean	858,231
North America	174,180
Europe	2,417,433
European Union	1,601,863
Other Europe	815,570
Africa	1,647,410
Asia	616,222
Oceania	10,675
Total	9,464,210

Country of birth in Spain
Resident Population groups	Year																									
Resident Population groups	2002		2004		2006		2008		2010		2012		2014		2016		2018		2020		2022		2024		2026 (October)	
Resident Population groups	Number	%	Number	%	Number	%	Number	%	Number	%	Number	%	Number	%	Number	%	Number	%	Number	%	Number	%	Number	%	Number	%
Spaniards	38,701,173	94.31%	38,999,785	91.66%	39,371,997	89.46%	39,790,019	87.12%	40,206,557	86.49%	40,523,263	86.55%	40,542,974	87.20%	40,505,719	87.26%	40,437,561	86.69%	40,303,297	85.18%	40,018,611	84.27%	39,781,461	81.82%	39,502,551	79.11%
Foreigners	2,334,098	5.69%	3,547,669	8.34%	4,637,972	10.54%	5,878,919	12.88%	6,280,064	13.51%	6,294,953	13.45%	5,952,770	12.80%	5,913,165	12.74%	6,207,509	13.31%	7,014,753	14.82%	7,468,116	15.73%	8,838,234	18.18%	10,433,091	20.89%
Total	41,035,271	100%	42,547,454	100%	44,009,969	100%	45,668,938	100%	46,486,621	100%	46,818,216	100%	46,495,744	100%	46,418,884	100%	46,645,070	100%	47,318,050	100%	47,486,727	100%	48,619,695	100%	49,935,642	100%

Source: Continuous Population Statistics 2002-2026(INE)

== Religions ==
Religion in Spain (CIS poll, December 2020)
1. Non-practicing Catholic (41.6%)
2. Practicing Catholic (20.1%)
3. Agnostic/Non-believer (20.8%)
4. Atheist (13.6%)
5. Other denominations and religions (2.70%)
6. Did not answer (1.20%)

The Reconquista was the long process by which the Catholics reconquered Spain from Islamic rule by 1492. The Spanish Inquisition was established in 1478 to complete the religious orthodoxy of the Iberian Peninsula. In the centuries that followed, Spain saw itself as the bulwark of Catholicism and doctrinal purity; since then, Catholicism has been the main religion in Spain.

Spanish missionaries carried Catholicism to the Americas and the Philippines, establishing various missions in the newly colonized lands. The missions served as a base for both administering colonies as well as spreading Christianity.

The Spanish Constitution of 1978 abolished Catholicism as the official state religion, but recognised the role it plays in Spanish society. From the end of the Francoist dictatorship to the present day, a secularisation process has taken place that has meant a progressive decrease in religious practice, in the attendance at the different religious rites (baptisms, communions and Catholic marriages) and in the percentage of Spaniards who identify as Catholic. Consequently, a majority of Spaniards today ignore Catholic doctrines on matters such as pre-marital sex, homosexuality and contraception. Despite the drop, Catholic identity nevertheless remains an important part of Spain's culture.

As of 2018, 68.5% of the population define themselves as Catholic, 26.4% as non-believers or atheists, and 2.6% other religions according to the official Spanish Center for Sociological Research. Among believers, 59% assert they almost never go to any religious service, by contrast, 16.3% attend one or more religious service almost every week.

There have been three Popes from what is now Spain, all of them from the Crown of Aragon: Calixtus III, Alexander VI and Benedict XIII. Spanish mysticism provided an important intellectual resource against Protestantism with Carmelites like Teresa of Ávila, a reformist nun and John of the Cross, a priest, taking the lead in their reform movement. Later, they became Doctors of the Church. The Society of Jesus was co-founded by Ignatius of Loyola, whose Spiritual Exercises and movement led to the establishment of hundreds of colleges and universities in the world, including 28 in the United States alone. The Society's co-founder, Francis Xavier, was a missionary who reached India and later Japan. In the 1960s, Jesuits Pedro Arrupe and Ignacio Ellacuría supported the movement of Liberation Theology.

A study made by the Union of Islamic Communities of Spain demonstrated that there were about 1,700,000 inhabitants of Muslim background living in Spain as of 2012, accounting for 3–4% of the total population of Spain. The vast majority was composed of immigrants and descendants originating from Morocco and other African countries. More than 514,000 (30%) of them had Spanish nationality. The recent waves of immigration have also led to an increasing number of Muslims, Buddhists, Sikhs and Hindus. After the Reconquista in 1492, Muslims did not live in Spain for centuries. Their ranks have since been bolstered by recent immigration, especially from Morocco and Algeria. Judaism was practically non-existent in Spain from the 1492 expulsion until the 19th century, when Jews were again permitted to enter the country. Currently there are around 62,000 Jews in Spain, or 0.14% of the total population. Most are arrivals in the past century, while some are descendants of earlier Spanish Jews. Approximately 80,000 Jews are thought to have lived in Spain prior to its expulsion. However the Jewish Encyclopedia states the number over 800,000 to be too large and 235,000 as too small: 165,000 is given as expelled as possibly too small in favour of 200,000, and the numbers of converts after the 1391 pogroms as less. Other sources suggest 200,000 converts mostly after the pogroms of 1391 and upwards of 100,000 expelled. Up until recently, descendants of these Sephardic Jews expelled in 1492 were eligible for Spanish citizenship if they requested it.

== Languages ==
- Spanish 99% (88% mother tongue) (official nationwide)
- Catalan 16% (9% mother tongue) (co-official in Catalonia, Balearic Islands, and Valencia — see Valencian)
- Galician 7% (5% mother tongue) (co-official in Galicia)
- Basque 1.6% (1% mother tongue) (co-official in Basque Country and designated areas in Navarre).
- Aranese (a variant of Gascon Occitan) is co-official in Val d'Aran, a small valley in the Pyrenees.

Others with no official status:

- Asturian-Leonese (in the former Kingdom of León and Asturias)
- Aragonese (in the province of Huesca, Aragon)
- Arabic (in the autonomous city of Ceuta)
- Tarifit (in the autonomous city of Melilla)

=== First languages, 2021 official survey ===
First language, 2021 census (2 years old or more)
Language	Initial language	
Language	Absolute	Percentage
Spanish	37,650,425	81.53
of which only Spanish	34,477,775	74.66
Catalan (including Valencian and Balearic )	4,846,933	10.50
Galician	1,742,974	3.77
Arabic	1,001,792	2.17
English	730,251	1.58
Romanian	664,407	1.44
Basque	658,030	1.42
French	432,209	0.94
Portuguese	251,497	0.54
Chinese	221,331	0.48
German	205,289	0.44
Italian	188,651	0.41
Bulgarian	152,037	0.33
Russian	147,864	0.32
Ukrainian	76,297	0.17
Polish	61,926	0.13
Berber	59,797	0.13
Dutch	51,672	0.11
Urdu	50,983	0.11
Guarani	36,807	0.08
Wolof	34,581	0.07
Asturian	26,584	0.06
Other languages	347,363	0.75
Total	46,181,637	>100.0

== Educational system ==
About 70% of Spain's students in non-university education attend public schools; 79.1% of students in higher education are enrolled in public universities. The remainder attend private schools or universities, many of which are operated by the Catholic Church.

Compulsory education begins with primary school or general basic education for ages 6–16. It is free in public schools and in many private schools, most of which receive government subsidies. Following graduation, students attend either a secondary school offering a general high school diploma or a school of professional study in all fields – law, sciences, humanities, and medicine – and the technical schools offer programs in engineering and architecture.

== See also ==
- Health in Spain
- Demographics of Madrid
- List of Spaniards
- Romani people in Spain
- Ranked list of Spanish autonomous communities
- Singular population entity
- Contemporary history of Spain
- Empty Spain
