= Germanía =

16th-century criminal slang in Spain

Germanía (Spanish: [xeɾ.maˈni.a]) is the Spanish term for the argot used by criminals or in jails in Spain during 16th and 17th centuries. Its purpose is to keep outsiders out of the conversation. The ultimate origin of the word is the Latin word germanus, through Catalan germà (brother) and germania ("brotherhood, guild").

Some documentation for it occurs in picaresque works as early as the Spanish Golden Century, such as in Quevedo's El Buscón. Some writers used it in poetry for comical effect.

After the arrival of the Romani people and their frequent imprisonment, germanía incorporated much vocabulary from Romany and its descendant, the caló jargon. As time passed, several words entered popular use and even standard Spanish, losing their value for secrecy. Germanía survives today in the cheli jargon.

== War of the Germanías ==
The term germanía ("brotherhood" in Catalan—compare with Galician irmandade and Spanish hermandad) originated from the name of a revolt against the local nobility in Valencia, Spain during the sixteenth century. Subsequently, the term referred to the argot used by these communities and, eventually, it referred to improper argot.

== Use in literature ==
Characters in the original Spanish version of Arturo Pérez-Reverte's Captain Alatriste series make use of germanía. Pérez-Reverte gave a speech on the subject of germanía to the Real Academia Española de la Lengua after they invited him to join the academy for the work he had done on the series.

== Other jargons based on Spanish ==
- Bron
- Gacería
- Lunfardo (Argentina and Uruguay)
- Quinqui

== See also ==
- Thieves' cant
- Rotwelsch
