= Sarau =

Sarau can mean:

- Sarau (event), a cultural, music, or sporting event of Portuguese/Brazilian origin
- Groß Sarau, municipality in Schleswig-Holstein, Germany

See also:

- Upper Moutere, New Zealand, originally called Sarau
- Jeff Sarau, Australian rules footballer
- Gheorghe Sarău, Romanian linguist
