= Segarcea-Vale =

- Commune
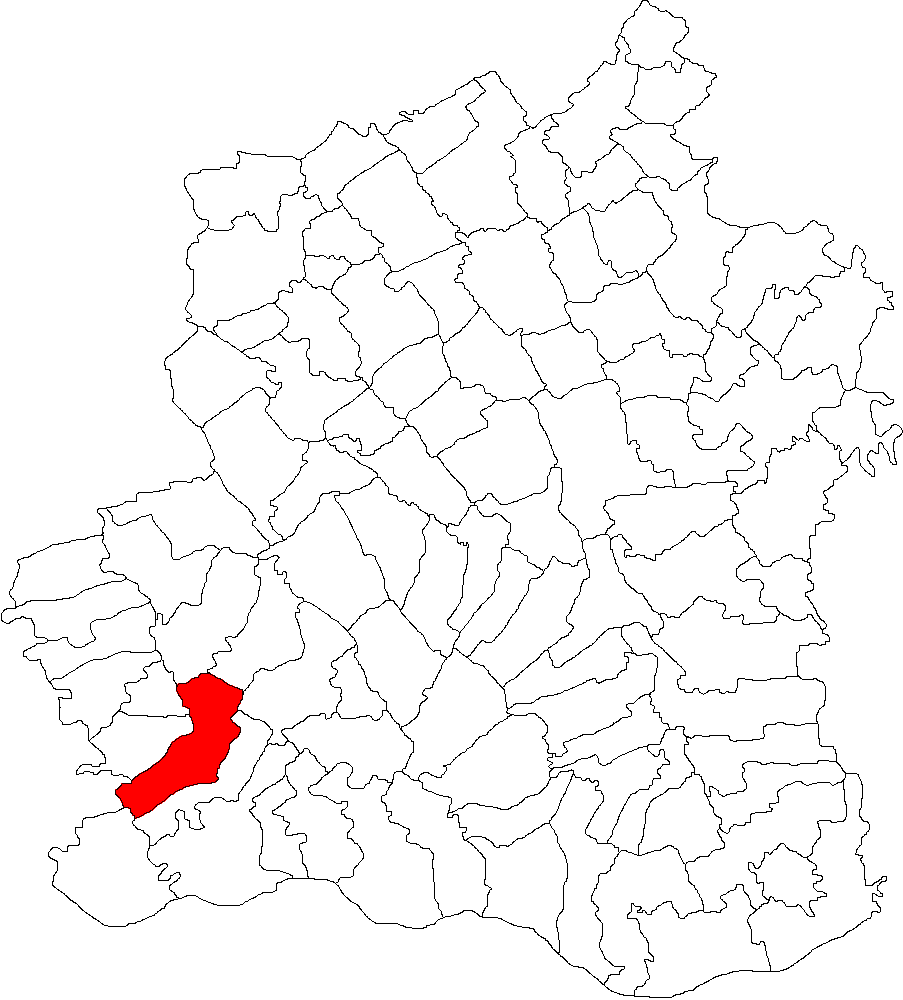
- Location in Teleorman County

- Location in Romania
- Coordinates: 43°49′N 24°48′E
- Country: Romania
- County: Teleorman
- Subdivisions: Olteanca, Segarcea-Deal, Segarcea-Vale

Government
  - Mayor (2024–2028): Claudiu Gabriel Gheldiu (PNL)
- Area: 72.78 km^{2} (28.10 sq mi)
- Elevation: 56 m (184 ft)
- Population (2021-12-01): 2,660
  - Density: 36.5/km^{2} (94.7/sq mi)
- Time zone: UTC+02:00 (EET)
  - Summer (DST): UTC+03:00 (EEST)
- Postal code: 147335
- Vehicle reg.: TR
- Website: primariasegarceavale.ro

Segarcea-Vale is a commune in Teleorman County, Muntenia, Romania. It is composed of three villages: Olteanca, Segarcea-Deal, and Segarcea-Vale.

== Natives ==
- Florian Cristescu (1884–1949), writer, schoolteacher and politician
- Gheorghe Sarău (born 1956), linguist
- Dimitrie Stelaru (1917–1971), poet and novelist
