= Florian Cristescu =

Romanian educator, politician and children's writer

Florian Cristescu (1 August 1884 – 29 June 1949) was a Romanian schoolteacher, educational administrator, politician, and a widely read author of children's literature. He was an influential figure in Interwar Romania, known for his contributions to primary education, school reform, and literature for young readers.

== Early life and education ==
Florian Cristescu was born on 1 August 1884 in Segarcea-Deal, Teleorman County, Kingdom of Romania. He graduated from the Normal School in Bucharest in 1906, after which he began his teaching career at the institution's practice school. He later worked as a primary school teacher in Turnu Măgurele and Roșiorii de Vede.

Over time, Cristescu was promoted to school director and later served as school inspector (revisor școlar) for Teleorman County. Actively involved in the modernization of the Romanian educational system, he was sent on study visits to Bulgaria and Hungary to examine contemporary models of school organization. His findings were later published in two educational pamphlets.

== Educational and administrative career ==
Throughout his career, Cristescu held numerous positions within Romania's educational administration. He was a strong advocate for accessible and high-quality education, particularly in rural areas. His work combined pedagogical practice with educational policy, reflecting broader interwar efforts to modernize public education.

In addition to his teaching and administrative duties, Cristescu authored and co-authored several school textbooks, including primers, reading books, geography manuals, and textbooks for arithmetic and calligraphy. Many of these works were written in collaboration with well-known Romanian educators, such as Petre Dulfu.

== Political activity ==
Following the Great Union of 1918, Cristescu entered political life, as a member of the National Liberal Party. In 1921, he was elected as a deputy to the Parliament of Romania and later served as a senator. He was also a member of the General Council of Public Instruction, where he contributed to national education policy during the interwar period.

His political involvement during this era led to his marginalization in the early years of the communist regime, when his name was temporarily removed from public circulation.

== Literary work ==
Florian Cristescu was one of the most popular Romanian authors of children's literature in the interwar period, rivaling figures such as N. Batzaria in terms of public recognition. His stories combined educational themes with folklore, history, and moral instruction, making them widely used both in schools and at home.

His best-known book, Familia Roade-mult, was published in ten editions during the interwar years and reissued twice during the communist period after his name was removed from the list of banned authors. He also founded and edited children's magazines, including Cimpoiul fermecat and Fluierașul, the latter being the first illustrated children's magazine in Romania.

Cristescu was also a contributor, editor, or regular collaborator for numerous literary and cultural periodicals, among them Viața literară și artistică, Șezătoarea săteanului, Gazeta țăranilor, Cosânzeana, Flacăra, Evenimentul, and Muguri.

== Death and legacy ==
Florian Cristescu died on 29 June 1949 in Turnu Măgurele. Although his political activity led to the suppression of his name during the early communist period, his literary and educational legacy endured. His works continued to be read and republished, and he remains an important figure in the history of Romanian children's literature and interwar education.

== Selected works ==
- Familia Roade-mult
- Povestea neamului nostru scrisă pe înțelesul tuturor (3 volumes)
- În mijlocul horelor
- Firicel Voinicul
- Păsărele și păpuși
- Datini strămoșești
- O clacă în sat la noi
- Pagini din istoria neamului românesc
- Din povestea neamului nostru
