= Juan de Dios Ramírez Heredia =

Spanish politician and Romani rights activist (born 1942)

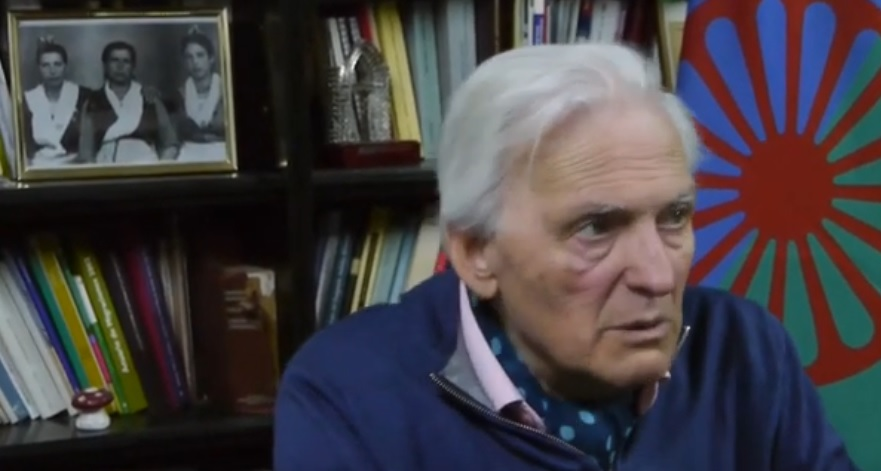

Member of the European Parliament for Spain
- In office 1986–1999

Member of the Congress of Deputies for Barcelona
- In office 1977–1986

Personal details
- Born: 29 July 1942 (age 84) Puerto Real, Spain
- Party: PSOE
- Occupation: Politician, lawyer, activist

Juan de Dios Ramírez Heredia (born 29 July 1942) is a Spanish politician and Romani rights activist. From 1986 to 1999, he was a Member of the European Parliament for the Spanish Socialist Workers' Party (PSOE). He was born in Puerto Real.

== Background ==
By profession he is a lawyer and is a graduate in Information Science from the Autonomous University of Barcelona, a Doctor in Information Sciences and Master of General Basic Education (EGB). He was Director of the School of Vocational Rehabilitation, "San Juan Bosco" for the physically handicapped in Barcelona between 1970 and 1990.

== Political career ==
A member of the Spanish Romani community, he has been involved in highlighting and defending the rights of Romani people. In recognition of this work, in February 2008 he was awarded an Honorary Doctorate by the University of Cádiz, the first Rom to receive this distinction in the world. Ramírez Heredia also promotes Romanò-Kalò, a variant of International Romani, enriched by Caló words. His goal is to reunify the Caló and Romani roots.
