= Caló language =

Mixed Iberian-Romani language

Caló
- Native to: Spain, Portugal, south of France
- Native speakers: 60,000 (L1 in Spain and Portugal) (2015)
- Language family: mixed Romani–Iberian Romance
- Early form: Germanía

Language codes
- ISO 639-3: rmq
- Glottolog: calo1236

Caló (English: /kəˈloʊ/; Spanish: [kaˈlo]; Catalan: [kəˈlo]; Galician: [kaˈlɔ]; Portuguese: [kɐˈlɔ]; French: [ka.lo]) is a mixed language spoken by the gitanos of Spain and the ciganos of Portugal. In Romani linguistics, it is considered a Para-Romani language based on Romance grammar, with an adstratum of Romani lexical items, through language shift by the Romani community. Catalan, Galician, Portuguese, and Spanish caló are closely related varieties that share a common root.

Spanish caló, or Spanish Romani, was originally known as zincaló. Portuguese caló, or Portuguese Romani, also goes by the term lusitano-romani; it used to be referred to as calão, but this word has since acquired the general sense of jargon or slang, often with a negative undertone (cf. baixo calão, 'obscene language', lit. low-level calão).

The language is also spoken in Brazil, France, Venezuela, Portugal and Colombia.

Some Caló expressions have been borrowed into modern Spanish jerga (slang), such as camelar (to seduce), currar (to work) and dar lache (to cringe in shame or embarrassment).

== Etymology ==
Calé is the endonym of the Romani people in Iberia, and caló means 'the language spoken by the calé'. However, the calé are commonly known in Portuguese- and Spanish-speaking countries by the exonyms ciganos and gitanos.

In caló and other varieties of Romani, kalo means 'black' or 'absorbing all light', hence closely resembling words for 'black' and/or 'dark' in Indo-Aryan languages (e.g. Sanskrit काल kāla 'black', 'of a dark colour'). Hence caló and calé may have originated as ancient exonyms.

== Linguistic features ==
=== Phonology ===
Caló has six vowels:

	Front	Central	Back
Close	i		u
Mid	e̞	ə	o̞
Open		a	

It has the following consonant inventory:

	Labial	Alveolar	Postalveolar	Palatal	Velar	Glottal
Nasal	m	n				
Plosive	p⠀b	t⠀d			k⠀ɡ	
Affricate		t͡s⠀d͡z	t͡ʃ⠀d͡ʒ			
Fricative	f	s	ʃ		x	h
Approximant		l		j		
Tap		ɾ				
Trill		r				

Notable phonological features of Iberian Caló are:

- the loss of the distinction between aspirated /pʰ tʰ kʰ tʃʰ/, unaspirated /p t k tʃ/ and voiced /b d ɡ dʒ/.
- the merger of /b/ and /v/ – betacism.
- affrication of /t d/ to /tʃ dʒ/ before the front vowels /i/ and /e̞/ cf. Brazilian Portuguese /ti/, /di/ > [tʃi ~ tɕi], [dʒi ~ dʑi].

=== Samples ===
Spanish Romani:

Y sasta se hubiese catanado sueti baribustri, baribustri, y abillasen solictos á ó de los fores, os penó por parabola: Manu chaló abri á chibar desqueri simiente: y al chibarle, yeque aricata peró sunparal al drun, y sinaba hollada, y la jamáron as patrias e Charos. Y aver peró opré bar: y pur se ardiñó, se secó presas na terelaba humedad. Y aver peró andré jarres, y as jarres, sos ardiñáron sat siró, la mulabáron. Y aver peró andré pu lachi: y ardiñó, y diñó mibao á ciento por yeque. Penado ocono, se chibó á penar á goles: Coin terela canes de junelar, junele.
Parable of the Sower, Luke, 8, 4–8, as published by George Borrow in 1838

Compare with a Spanish version:

Cuando una gran multitud se reunió y personas de cada ciudad fueron donde Jesús, Él les habló con una parábola. «Un campesino salió a sembrar su semilla. Al sembrar algunas cayeron en la carretera; fueron pisoteadas y se las comieron los pájaros del cielo. Otras semillas cayeron encima de la roca, tan pronto como crecieron se secaron porque no tenían humedad. Otras cayeron entre los espinos, y los espinos crecieron con éstas y las sofocaron. Otras cayeron en tierra buena; crecieron y dieron fruto, cien veces más.» Después de decir estas cosas gritó, «¡Aquel que tiene oídos para escuchar, que escuche!»

==== The Lord's Prayer ====
The Lord's Prayer has often been used as a parallel text:

Spanish Caló:

Amaro Dada, oté andré o Tarpe, majarificable sinele tun nao. Abillele tun chim. Sinele querdi tun pesquital andré a jolili, sasta andré o Tarpe. Diñamangue achibes amaro manro de cada chibes. Y amangue ertina amarias visabas, andiar sasta mu ertinamos á os sares, sos debisarelen amangue buchi. Y na enseeles amangue andré o chungalo y choro.
Luke, 11, 2-4, Embéo e Majaró Lucas, translated by George Borrow, 1837.

Lovara Balkans Romani:

Amaro Dat, kai san ando rhaio, te avel cho anav ankerdo Swunto. Chi amperetsia te avel, chi voia te kerdiol pe phuv sar ando rhaio. De amen adies amaro manrho sar swako dies. Iertisar amare bezexa; sar vi ame iertis kodolen kai keren bezexa karing amende. Na mek ame te zhas ando zumaimos; numa skepisar ame katar o nasul iek.
Luke, 11, 2-4, Romani (Gypsy) New Testament: E Lashi Viasta. Ruth Modrow, 1984.

Spanish:

Padre nuestro que estás en los cielos: Santificado sea tu nombre; venga tu reino; sea hecha tu voluntad, como en el cielo, así también en la tierra. el pan nuestro de cada día, dánoslo hoy; y perdónanos nuestros pecados porque también nosotros perdonamos a todos los que nos deben. Y no nos metas en tentación, mas líbranos del mal.
Luke, 11, 2-4, Spanish Bible: Reina-Valera 1569, revised 1960.

== Loans ==
=== Spanish ===
Many Caló terms have been borrowed in Spanish (especially as slangisms and colloquialisms), often through flamenco lyrics and criminal jargon (germanía).

Examples are gachó/gachí ("man/woman", from gadjo/gadji), chaval ("boy", originally "son", also present in English as chav), parné ("money"), currelar or currar ("to work"), fetén ("excellent"), pinreles ("feet"), biruji ("cold"), churumbel ("boy"), gilí ("silly, stupid"), chachi ("outstanding, genuine"), (un)debel or debla ("god/goddess"), mengue ("demon"), chorar or chorrar in Spain ("to steal", also present in English slang as to chaw), molar ("to be appealing to someone"), piltra ("bed"), acais ("eyes"), chola ("head"), jeró ("face"), napia ("nose"), muí ("mouth"), lache ("shame"), pitingo ("vain"), chungo ("bad, nasty, dodgy"), guripa ("cheeky, soldier"), ful ("fake"), paripé ("pretence, white lie"), juncal ("slender, graceful"), pure or pureta ("old"), sobar ("to sleep"), quer or queli ("house"), garito ("house, gambling den"), jalar ("to eat with great apetite"), cate ("hit"), jiñar ("to defecate, to fear"), diñar ("to give, to die"), palmar ("to die"), chinarse ("to get upset"), langui ("lame"), chalado or pirado ("crazy"), pirarse ("to leave", "to make oneself scarce"), changar ("to break"), chivarse ("to denounce sb, to squeal"), chivato ("informer"), hacerse el longuis ("to pretend to be absent-minded"), pringar ("to get sb mixed up, to overdo"), chingar ("to have sexual relations, to bother"), chinorri ("little"), najar ("to flee"), privar ("drink, to drink"), mangar ("to steal"), nanay ("no way, there isn't"), chorizo ("thief"), achantar ("to intimidate"), pispar ("to nick"), birlar ("to nick"), achanta la muí ("shut your mouth"), canguelo or cangueli ("fear"), cañí ("Romani person"), calé ("Romani person"), caló ("language of the Iberian Kale"), calas ("money"), curda ("drunkenness"), menda ("myself"), and galochi ("heart"), payo ("non-Romani person, fool, easy to cheat").

Some words underwent a shift in meaning in the process: camelar (etymologically related to Sanskrit kāma, "love, desire") in colloquial Spanish has the meaning of "to woo, to seduce, to deceive by adulation" (but also "to love", "to want"; although this sense has fallen into disuse), but in Caló it more closely matches the Spanish meanings of querer ("to want" and "to love"). In addition camelar and the noun camelo can also mean either "lie" or "con".

Caló also appears to have influenced Madrid slang cheli and quinqui, the language of another Iberian group of travellers who are not ethnically Romani. Gacería, a cant spoken by makers of agricultural equipment in a village of Segovia, also derives some words from Caló.

=== Catalan ===
To a lesser extent than in Spanish, Caló terms have also been adapted into Catalan as slangisms and colloquialisms, most of which were taken adopted from Spanish slang.

Examples are halar (pronounced [həˈla] or [xəˈla]; "to eat"), xaval ("boy"), dinyar(-la) ("to die"), palmar(-la) ("to die"), cangueli ("fear"), paio ("non-Romani person"), calés ("money"), caló ("language of the Iberian Kale"), cangrí ("prison"), pispar ("to nick"), birlar ("to nick"), xorar ("to steal"), mangar ("to steal"), molar ("to like"), pringar ("to get sb mixed up, to overdo"), pirar(-se) ("to leave, to make oneself scarce"), sobar ("to sleep"), privar ("drink, to drink"), ("pleb"), laxe ("shame"), catipén ("stink"), xaxi ("outstanding, genuine"), xivar-se'n ("to denounce sb, to squeal"), xivato ("informer"), xinar(-se) ("to get upset"), fer el llonguis (lit. "Do a long one" fig. "to pretend to be thick/slow") and potra ("luck").

=== Portuguese ===
There are a small number of words of Caló (Calão) origin and many of those are indirect loans, borrowed via Spanish.

The examples generally understood by most or all speakers of Portuguese include gajo (pronounced [ˈɡaʒu], "man, dude", primarily in Portugal), chavalo ("lad, young boy"), chunga ("bad, nasty, dodgy"), chibar-se ("to denounce sb, to squeal"), chibo ("informer"), baque ([ˈbaki], [ˈbakɨ], generally "impact", but in this sense "sudden happiness"), pileque ([piˈlɛki], [piˈlɛk(ɨ)], "drunkenness"), chulé ("bad smell of feet"), pirar-se ("to leave"), pirado and chalado ("crazy").

== Language maintenance ==
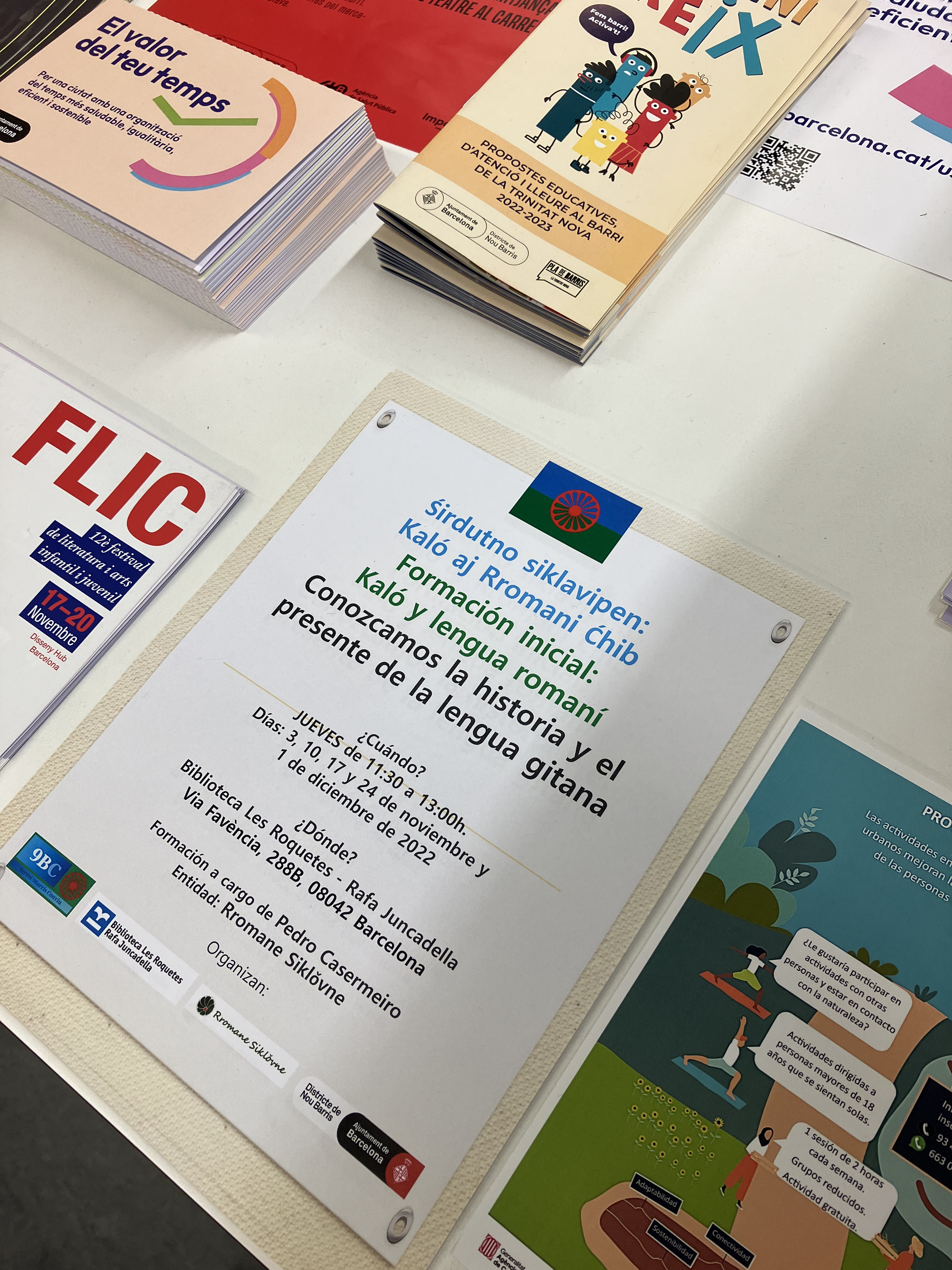
Lessons in Caló and Iberian Romani offered in a Barcelona library

There is a growing awareness and appreciation for Caló: "...until the recent work by Luisa Rojo, in the Autonomous University of Madrid, not even the linguistics community recognized the significance and problems of Caló and its world." Its world includes songs, poetry and flamenco.

As Iberian Romani proper is extinct and as Caló is endangered, some people are trying to revitalise the language. The Spanish politician Juan de Dios Ramírez Heredia promotes Romanò-Kalò, a variant of International Romani, enriched by Caló words. His goal is to reunify the Caló and Romani roots.

== Literature ==
In 1838, the first edition of Embéo E Majaró Lucas translated by George Borrow was published and began to be distributed in Madrid. This was Borrow's translation of the Gospel of Luke into Caló. A revision of this was printed in 1872.

== See also ==
- Angloromani
- Erromintxela
- Germanía
- Romani people in Spain
- The Zincali: An Account of the Gypsies of Spain
