= Romani language standardization =

Efforts to create standard forms of the languages spoken by the Roma peoples

There are independent groups currently working toward standardizing the Romani language, including groups in Romania, Serbia, the United States and Sweden.

== Where it is being pursued ==
A standardized form of Romani is used in Serbia. In Serbia's autonomous province of Vojvodina, Romani is one of the officially recognized minority languages – having its own radio stations and news broadcasts.

In Romania, the country with the largest identifiable Romani population, there is now a unified system for teaching the Romani language for all dialects spoken in the country. This is primarily a result of the work of Gheorghe Sarău, who made Romani textbooks for teaching Romani children.

Language standardization is presently also being pursued in the revival of the Romani language among various groups – in Spain, Great Britain and elsewhere – which have ceased to speak the language. In these cases, a specific dialect is not revived, but rather a standardized form derived from many dialects is developed. The Spanish politician Juan de Dios Ramírez Heredia promotes Romanò-Kalò, a variant of Standard Romani with the extant Caló words inserted back, aiming to both the Gitano tradition and communication with other Romani people.

== Standardization approaches ==
Despite various efforts towards "universal" standardization, the overall trend in Romani literacy is towards regional codification, with some degree of international orientation, in the choice of some graphemes as well as vocabulary.

This international orientation allows Romani readers to appreciate texts composed in other countries. At the same time, this pluralistic approach to codification is representative of the dispersion of Romani communities, and the lack of a central governmental authority. 'Linguistic pluralism' of this kind has been embraced as a policy by the European Roma and Traveller Forum (the elected Romani representation at the Council of Europe) in a statement on its website. It has also received the support of various leading linguists investigating Romani, such as the late Milena Hübschmannová, Dieter W. Halwachs, and Yaron Matras. The RomLex online Romani dictionary acknowledges pluralism by incorporating dialect variants, albeit in a consistent and unified spelling system.

=== Sarău's standardization ===
Gheorghe Sarău's standardized Romani, based largely on Eastern European Romani dialects is a purified, mildly prescriptive language, choosing vocabulary and grammatical elements traced back to the old language crystallized in Anatolia.

The pronunciation is most similar to that of the dialects from the first stratum. When there are more variants in the dialects, the variant that most closely resembles the oldest forms is chosen. For example, byav instead of abyav, abyau, akana instead of akanak, shunav instead of ashunav or ashunau, etc.

An effort is also made to derive new words from the vocabulary already in use, i.e., xuryavno (airplane), vortorin (slide rule), palpaledikhipnasko (retrospectively), pashnavni (adjective). There is an ever-changing set of borrowings from Romanian as well, including such terms as vremea (weather, time), primariya (town hall), frishka (cream), sfïnto (saint, holy). Neologisms taken from Hindi include bijli (bulb, electricity), misal (example), chitro (drawing, design), lekhipen (writing) and from English (printisarel, prezidento).

== See also ==
- Romani language
- Romani people
