= Bohemian Romani =

Extinct Romani dialect of Bohemia

- Bohemian Romany
- Native to: Czech Republic
- Region: Bohemia
- Ethnicity: Romani people in Bohemia
- Language family: Indo-European: Indo-Iranian; Indo-Aryan; Western Indo-Aryan; Romani; Carpathian; North Central; Bohemian Romani

Language codes
- ISO 639-3: None (mis)
- Glottolog: None

Bohemian Romani was a dialect of Romani formerly spoken by the Romani people of Bohemia, the western part of today's Czech Republic. It became extinct after World War II, due to the genocide of most of its speakers in extermination camps by Nazi Germany.

== Speakers ==
Before their extermination in the 1940s, speakers of Bohemian Romani, the Bohemian Romanies, were one of several nomadic populations of Bohemia. They led a peripatetic (or semi-peripatetic) way of life, travelling around the country (especially during the warmer seasons of the year) and offering their services to the sedentary population of the Bohemian countryside. They were mostly horse-dealers, peddlers, tinners, and entertainers.

The first ancestors of Bohemian Romanies probably arrived in Bohemia in the 16th and 17th centuries, from Slovakia via Moravia. Small-scale migration of Romanies from Slovakia to the Czech Lands (as well as backwards) continued throughout the following centuries. The Bohemian Romanies have always been a numerically insignificant minority. In 1939, there were ca. 6,000 people of different Romani groups in the territory of today's Czech Republic. Of these, a smaller fraction, perhaps some 2,000 people, lived in Bohemia. The proportion of different Romani groups in this figure is unknown, though the estimate of 500-1,500 of Bohemian Romanies cannot be wildly off the mark.

Other Romani groups in Bohemia, who spoke different dialects of Romani than the Bohemian Romani, included the Sinti and a few families of the Kalderar (or Kalderaš) Roma. The Sinti appear to have been the first Romani group to be established in the region, some of them arriving from southeastern Europe as early as in the 15th century; they mostly inhabited the German-speaking parts of Bohemia. The Kalderar, on the other hand, were relatively late newcomers, having had migrated from Wallachia in the second half of the 19th century. In addition, there were also several non-Romani peripatetic groups in Bohemia, who spoke Czech or German or argots based on these languages.

The self-ethnonym of Bohemian Romanies was simply Rom (plural Roma). They were called "Hungarians" by the Sinti; this probably reflects their origin in Slovakia, which was then part of Hungary. They were called "Poles" (Poljako, plural Poljača) by the Kalderash, which is one of the ethnonyms the Kalderar use to refer to different Romani groups. The sedentary population referred to all peripatetic groups, including Bohemian Roma, as "gypsies": cikáni in Czech or Zigeuner in German.

In the early 20th century, Bohemian Romani was, at least in some groups of Bohemian Roma, gradually becoming a non-native ethnic language, acquired in late childhood and used mostly for secretive purposes.. Clearly, a development had started toward a Para-Romani variety, that is, a specialized non-native variety spoken by Roma, which has the grammar of a majority language (Czech in this case) as well as an access to Romani-derived lexicon.

The Nazi genocide of Roma and Sinti in the 1940s brought about radical death of all Romani dialects of pre-war Bohemia, including Bohemian Romani. Only ca. 600 (i.e. 10% of) Czech Roma and Sinti survived the genocide, including perhaps a hundred of Bohemian Roma. Bohemian Romani ceased to be used by the survivors due to a complete social disintegration of their communities, and they ceased to transmit the language to their children. The last known speaker of Bohemian Romani died in the 1970s.

The historical group of Bohemian Romanies must be distinguished from those Romanies groups that live in Bohemia presently. The latter are post-World War II immigrants from Slovakia (especially Romungro), who do not speak Bohemian Romani.

== Dialect classification ==
Bohemian Romani belongs to the North Central dialect group of Romani. It is most closely related to Moravian Romani and West Slovak Romani, together with which it forms the Western subgroup of North Central Romani. Although clearly a North Central dialect, Bohemian Romani also shares a few features with the Sinti dialects of Romani. In some cases, these are due to diffusion from Sinti into Bohemian Romani. While Bohemian Romani would have been intelligible to speakers of other North Central dialects, there is evidence that there was no inherent intelligibility between Bohemian Romani and Sinti.

== Lexicon ==
Bohemian Romani shares with other dialects of Romani much of its Indo-Aryan vocabulary as well as numerous early loanwords from Western Iranian languages (Persian and/or Kurdish), Armenian, Ossetic, and Greek. In addition, it shares with the other North Central dialects of Romani the layer of loanwords from South Slavic languages, Hungarian, and Slovak. Finally, the most recent loanwords originate in Czech.

Examples of loanwords

- West Iranian: angrusťi "ring", baxt "luck", čupňi(k) "whip"
- Armenian: burnek "handful", grast "horse"
- West Iranian or Armenian: čekat "forehead"
- Ossetic: círax "shoe, boot", xólov "trousers"
- Greek: 'amoňis "anvil", armin "cabbage", efta "seven", foros "town", ľiťhi "fruit tree", paxoň- "freeze"
- South Slavic: caklo "glass", doha "enough", dugo "long", duma "speech", vičin- "shout"
- Hungarian: bugaris "spider" (< "beetle"), dilos "noon", faďin- "freeze"
- Slovak: čapláris "inn keeper"
- Czech: mořos "sea"
- Slovak or Czech: hrobos "grave", národos "friend" (< "nation")

Ehas jekh čorro rom. Kerelas buťi. Kana kerelas, kerďas dešupandž karfa, the diňas len peskra romňake, kaj te džal jarreske. Kana vaš oda jarro geľas, avľas, thoďas, ušanďas xumer. Pale kerďas mačiki, thoďas len pro čáro. Bešte pr-oda čáro bištheštar maťha. Phenďas o rom peskra romňake: "Dikhes romňije, me som murš, kaj bištheštar maťhen tel jekha dabate našavava." E romňi phenďas: "Me džanav, kaj hi meg feder murš meg sal tu, kaj čivela peskri thaľik pro šipkos, kaj la lela tel, aňi na čalavela."

== See also ==
- North Central Romani
- Romani people
- Romani Holocaust
- Language death
