= Cheli =

Spanish-language juvenile sociolect from Madrid

Cheli (Spanish: [ˈtʃeli]) is a Spanish-language juvenile sociolect or jargon diatopically restricted to the Madrid area, developed in the 1970s, primarily associated to the post-Francoist counterculture. It drew influence from the criminal underworld and drug-dealing jargons, and it has been noted for Spanishizing Caló and English words as well as rescuing archaic Spanish-language words. Some popular Cheli words (such as privar, molar or vasca) were actually recorded already in the early 20th century in dictionaries of argot, even if frequently with different meanings.

Other phenomena related to the sociolect include the distortion of words, modified with -ata, -eras, -ota and -eta suffixes. While as a non-technical jargon, many, if not most, of its words have fallen into disuse as the language evolves, some of them have proven resilient enough to remain in the spoken language at the expense of more recent words.

Being a fundamentally oral jargon, there are at least two adaptations in cheli literature. In 1994, the chaplain of the now defunct Carabanchel prison, Antonio Alonso, published ‘El Chuchi, los colegas y la basca’ (Editorial CCS, Madrid), an adaptation of the New Gospel. In 2022, ‘El chaval principeras’ (Libros desde Tuma, Madrid), the full translation by journalist Álvaro de Benito of The Little Prince by Antoine de Saint-Exupéry, was published. In addition, there are numerous written records in alternative publications, pamphlets and graffiti, especially during the prolific period of publishing in La Movida. Since the use of chat rooms and internet forums has become common among young people's communication, cheli has also been revitalised through the use of more or less original lexis.

== See also ==
- La Movida – 20th-century Spanish countercultural movement
