= Quinqui jargon =

Spanish dialect

Quinqui
- Native to: Spain
- Region: Edges of towns
- Language family: Cant

Language codes
- ISO 639-3: quq
- Glottolog: quin1236

Quinqui jargon is associated with quincalleros (an itinerant group). They are a semi-nomadic people who live mainly in the northern half of Spain. They prefer to be called mercheros. They have declined in number from earlier reports and are possibly vanishing as a distinct ethnic group.

The language is based on Germanía, an old Spanish criminal argot. It has elements of Caló, a dialect of the Spanish Roma, and Erromintxela, a mixed Basque–Kalderash Romani language.

The term comes from the word quincallería (ironmongery), from ironmongers who first used this cant as part of their trade. Because the men were frequently blamed for petty crime, the word is associated in modern Spanish with delinquents, petty thieves, or hoodlums. The mercheros identify as a distinct group separate from the Roma gitanos.

Scholars have many theories about the social origins of mercheros, summarized as the following:

- Descendants of mechanical workers who arrived in Spain from central Europe in the 16th century;
- Descendants of peasants who lost their land in the 16th century;
- Descendants of intermarriage between the Roma and non-Roma populations;
- Descendants of Muslims who became nomads after the expulsion in the 15th century to escape persecution; and/or
- A mixture of the above.

== Notable mercheros ==
- Eleuterio Sánchez, a.k.a. El Lute (born 1942). A petty thief in his early life, he was convicted of armed robbery and murder. After escaping from prison, he was listed among Spain's "Most Wanted" criminals by the Spanish police. Later he earned a law degree and wrote five books. He was pardoned at age 39.

== See also ==
- Camminanti
- Erromintxela language
- Gacería
- Gitanos
- Irish Travellers
- Sarakatsani
- Vaqueiros de alzada
- Yenish people
