= Gheorghe Sarău =

Romanian linguist

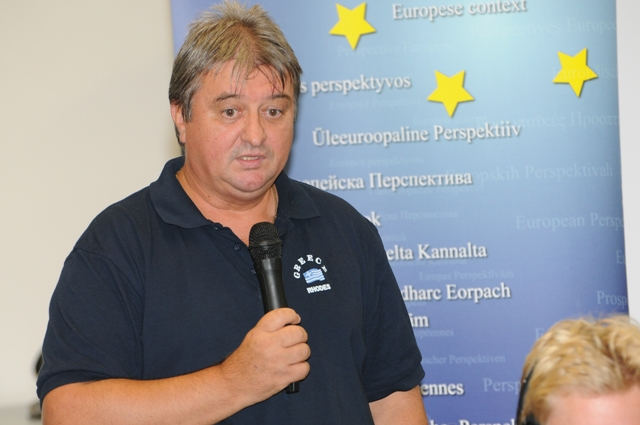
Gheorghe Sarău (in 2009)

Gheorghe Sarău (born 21 April 1956, Segarcea-Vale, Teleorman County, Romania) is a Romanian linguist specialized in the Romani language. He is the author of several Romani textbooks and plays an important role in the process of standardization of the Romani language.

He studied at the Faculty of Foreign Languages and Literatures, University of Bucharest, Russian-Hungarian section, from where he graduated in 1983. During his student years, he also studied Bulgarian, Spanish, German, English and French. While at the faculty, he came across a book on Romani people by Jean Vaillant, which also contained a short introduction to the Romani language. He started to study the language and learn it by himself. Sarău published a large number of articles and papers on the Romani language and participated at numerous national and international conferences on the language.

== See also ==
- Romani language
- Romani language standardization
