= The Coronet, Holloway Road =

Art Deco building on Holloway Road, North London

Coordinates: 51°33′20″N 0°06′56″W

The Coronet
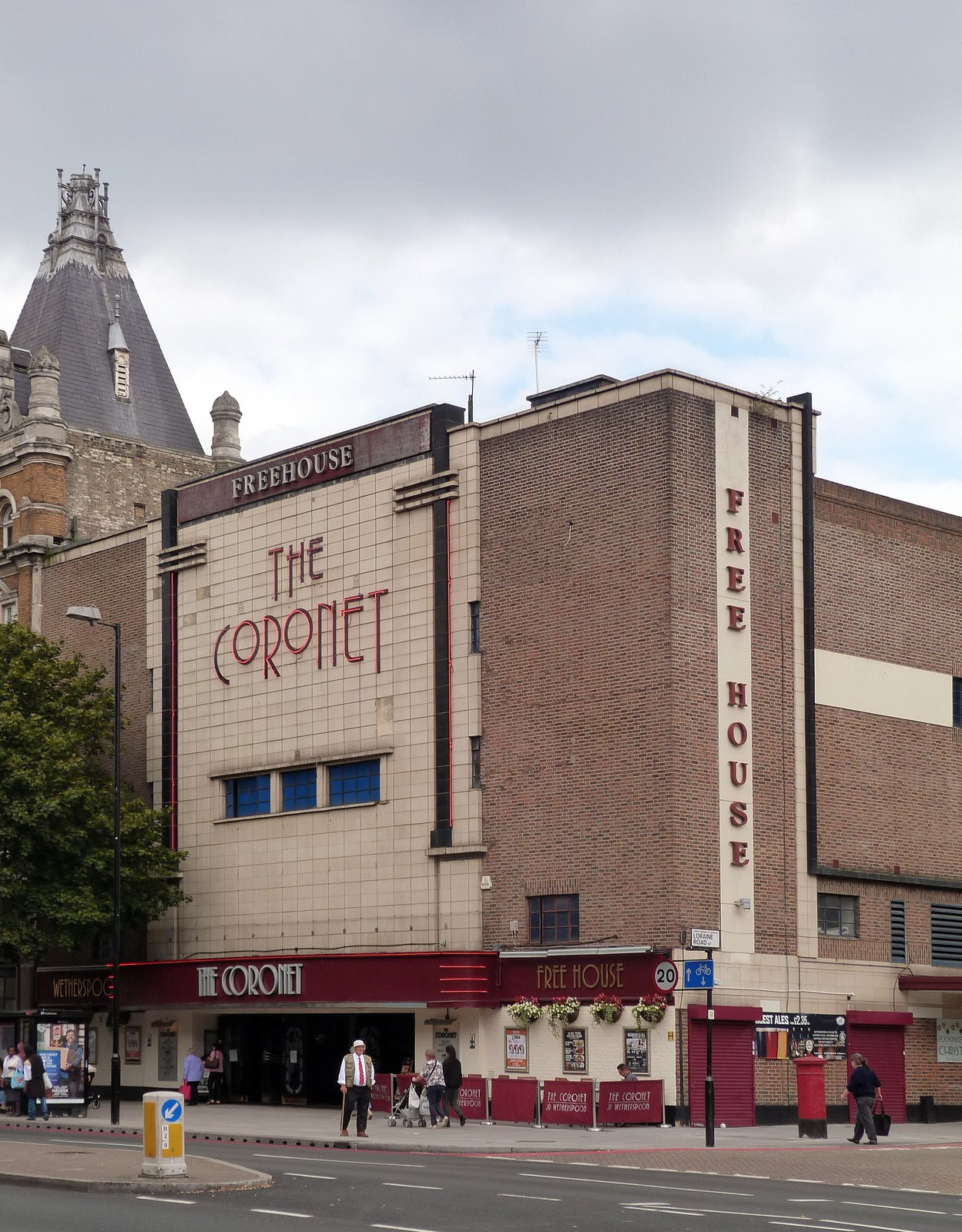
- The Coronet in 2014

General information
- Location: 338 Holloway Road, North London, United Kingdom
- Completed: 1940

Design and construction
- Architect: William R. Glen

Other information
- Public transit: Holloway Road

The Coronet is a landmark Art Deco building on Holloway Road, North London. Originally built as a cinema, it was later converted into a pub.

== History ==
=== Cinema (1940–1983) ===
In 1939, Associated British Cinemas announced the construction of the Savoy cinema adjoining the Jones Brothers department store on Holloway Road. Chief architect William R. Glen designed the building in a modern Art Deco style, with a seating capacity of 1,826, Ross projectors and RCA High Fidelity sound. The cinema's colourful interior was described in a contemporary edition of Kinematograph Weekly:

Five pairs of swing doors of wood with glass panels, under an extensive canopy, admit to the draught lobby which gives on to the entrance foyer, seventy-six feet by thirty. This apartment is floored with terrazzo, and the general decorative scheme is carried out in beige, pink and green.

The Savoy opened its doors on 5 February 1940, showing Golden Boy (1939) and Stronger than Desire (1939).

Along with many of the chain's other locations, the cinema was renamed the ABC in 1962. Its capacity was reduced to 1,680 seats, with 942 in the stalls and 738 in the circle. In the late 1970s, the cinema began offering live television presentations using the Eidophor system, mostly of Irish sporting events.

The ABC closed its doors on 17 February 1979. Its final film was Every Which Way But Loose (1978).

That year, ABC leased the building to Panton Films, which had amassed a number of London cinemas since it took over the Coronet in Notting Hill in 1977. As with many of the chain's sites, the building was renamed the Coronet after Panton's flagship location.

The cinema closed four years later, in 1983. A new leaseholder converted the stalls into a snooker hall, while the foyer was given over to an amusement arcade. A false ceiling hid the remainder of the auditorium. The snooker hall closed in 1986 and the building lay derelict for almost a decade, becoming infested with pigeons.

=== Pub (1996–present) ===
In the mid-1990s the building was bought and converted into a pub by J D Wetherspoon, at a reported cost of £1.5 million. The 1000-capacity venue—called "possibly the biggest pub in London" by the Evening Standard—opened in 1996, retaining the name The Coronet. In its first year, the pub received the Islington Society's Geoffrey Gribble Award for outstanding design and was declared 'one of the Top 10 pubs in London' by Angus McGill.

In 2015, J D Wetherspoon was found guilty of racial discrimination after the Coronet's manager David Leach ordered security staff to deny entry to Gypsy, Roma and Traveller customers attending a nearby conference organised by the Traveller Movement charity. The chain was ordered to pay £24,000 in damages. Both parties appealed the decision and the following year J D Wetherspoon agreed to pay a total of £44,000 in damages and make a donation of £4,000 to the charity.

J D Wetherspoon closed the pub in December 2023 and sold its freehold in a package of 30 pubs to DN Property London. A new leaseholder, Toll Gate TPL Limited, reopened the pub in 2024 and successfully applied to Islington Council for a licence to hold boxing, wrestling and MMA bouts at the venue. Baillifs took possession of the building in February 2026.

The pub once again reopened in August 2026 under the management of Florin Bogdan.
