= Crystal's Vardo =

English play

- Original language: English
- Written by: Suzanna King

Premiere
- Date: June 28, 2012
- Place: Pavilion Theatre, Brighton
- Directed by: Suzanna King
- Official website

Crystal's Vardo is an English theatre production written and directed by Suzanna King for children aged 7+, about the impact of being bullied at school on a young Gypsy girl's life. It uses dance, drama, humour and music, in a hybrid of theatre, storytelling, historical reconstruction and political education, to describe the culture and histories of Gypsy, Roma and Traveller communities. The play "remains entertaining while also raising awareness about the racism and injustice faced by Gypsies and Travellers today."

== History ==
Organised by Friends, Families and Travellers, Crystal's Vardo premiered at the Pavilion Theatre in Brighton in 2012 and has continued to play throughout the UK including at Hackney Empire and Ovalhouse in London. Its most recent tour was in 2022. The play's development received funding from the National Lottery Community Fund and the police. It has been put on at theatres, schools, community organisations, storytelling festivals, colleges, youth offending units, prisons, and conferences for people including teachers and pupils, health and police professionals. Resources developed to accompany it are used in teaching.

== Mission ==
According to its website, the artistic vision for Crystal's Vardo is to:

- "raise awareness about the rich histories and cultures of Gypsy, Roma and Traveller communities"
- "influence and initiate change by inspiring empathy and compassion"
- "affirm the cultural identity of Gypsy, Roma and Traveller people by exploring and celebrating the respective cultures and identities"
- "inspire dialogue and break down barriers between communities"

== Plot ==
Crystal "is fed up with the racist bullying at school and is considering flunking lessons. That’s the cue for the vardo to transform into a TARDIS that journeys back in time. We start in AD 400 and follow the Romany’s route of dispossession, criminalisation and extermination: from the Middle East to southern and central Europe. We pursue the trail into discriminatory legislation and practices that still exist in 21st century Britain."

"Narrated by Crystal as she time-travelled in her vardo [. . .] the play skipped through the centuries to an idealised future in which the discrimination finally ends."

== See also ==
- Anti-Romani sentiment
- Irish Travellers
- New Age travellers
- Romani people in the United Kingdom
- Romanichal
- Vardo (Romani wagon)
