= Top Gear controversies =

The British motoring-themed television programme Top Gear was often the focus of criticism. The criticism has ranged from minor viewer complaints to serious complaints where broadcasting watchdogs such as Ofcom have been involved.

Critics claim the programme shows disdain for the environment and promotes dangerous driving, whereas the BBC and show's presenters claim that "Top Gear takes issues of safety very seriously and none of our presenters advocate or encourage speeding or dangerous driving."

== Criticism of the BBC ==
One of the programme's presenters, Jeremy Clarkson, has been critical of the BBC regarding the handling of the programme. In the February 2006 issue of Top Gear Magazine, Clarkson revealed that he thought that the BBC did not take Top Gear seriously, making the length of the series far too long, and often replacing the show with live snooker coverage, despite Top Gear having considerably higher viewing figures.

In July 2006, the BBC rejected a variety of complaints regarding the criticism, claiming the producers and presenters choose the way they are covered, and that the BBC do not have any control over it. They argued that the presenters' provocative comments are "an integral part of the programme and are not intended to be taken seriously." Regarding offensive remarks traded between presenters and members of the audience, the BBC said "this is part of the appeal of the show, and we trust most viewers are familiar enough with the style and tone of the show not to take offence." The BBC pointed out that they would act if such statements and actions were carried out with any degree of seriousness or if the programme breached legal and safety requirements.

Ofcom received eleven complaints after an episode in series 22 was broadcast for allowing swearing pre-watershed.

After Andrew Flintoff's accident in 2022, Chris Harris appeared on a podcast with Joe Rogan. He said that he told the BBC three months prior that there would be a "serious injury" or "fatality" if the show's safety procedures were not improved. Paul Rees, who was The Stig at the time, sued BBC Studios, claiming that a lack of safety measures and instructing dangerous manouvres endangered both his and Flintoff's lives.

Although Top Gear is scripted, and this is acknowledged on the show, it sometimes receives criticism for some of its segments being scripted. Notable examples include the Hovervan segment, caravan holiday fire, and a caravan airship causing disruption at Norwich airport. A BBC spokesperson commented that Top Gear was an "entertainment show" and that "any suggestion it deliberately misled viewers is patently ludicrous."

== Proposed studio move ==
In 2006, Top Gear was in negotiations with the BBC to move to Enstone in north Oxfordshire which was closer to Clarkson's home in Chipping Norton. However, the producers were unable to negotiate a deal, after their initial application was blocked due to opposition by local residents, who feared that Top Gear would create pollution and noise issues.

== Accusations of homophobia and sexism ==
In December 2006, the BBC upheld complaints from four viewers after comments made by Jeremy Clarkson were considered to be homophobic references, had the potential to offend and should not have been broadcast. The complaints regarded comments made by Clarkson in the sixth episode of series eight, in which Clarkson agreed with an audience member who described the Daihatsu Copen as "a bit gay". He later described the vehicle as "ginger beer", taken to be rhyming slang for the term "queer". The BBC said there was "no editorial purpose" for the remarks and the "Top Gear team had been reminded of the importance of avoiding such comments about sexual orientation."

In December 2009, it was reported that a gay couple had been allegedly denied tickets to see the show being filmed. The context of the situation is unclear. A BBC spokesperson said, "We do not – absolutely do not – discriminate against same sex couples... the whole implication that Top Gear is in any way homophobic is completely wrong."

In a July 2011 review of the Jaguar XKR-S, Clarkson said that "in the corners it will get its tail out more readily than George Michael". Michael called Clarkson "pig-ugly" and "homophobic" in response to the remark.

Both the show and Clarkson have been accused of sexism and misogyny. James May later said that the show was just "painfully honest", and Richard Hammond also said that the show "wasn't laddish".

== Cultural mockery ==
=== India ===
During the show's India special, there were multiple gags such as building a toilet in the back of a Jaguar suggesting visiting tourists get diarrhoea. This led to a complaint by the Indian High Commission which criticised the show's "toilet humour".

=== Wales ===
The show received backlash in 2002 when Clarkson suggested that everybody should test drive their cars in Wales because "no-one wants to live there" in the second episode of series one. The comments were the subject of a complaint to the BBC by Labour AM Alun Pugh.

Presenter James May would later claim that following this comment, and years of offending Welsh viewers the presenters had received "threats on our lives", adding that the Welsh "really took offence" and referencing the Mexico controversy by stating "It isn't the Mexicans we have to worry about—it is the Welsh". May criticised the response saying "People shouldn't take what we say seriously".

=== United States ===
The show frequently mocks American culture. During the first American road trip, as part of a challenge, they painted slogans on their cars such as "NASCAR sucks", "Hillary for president" and "Man love rules OK" while driving through Alabama. This resulted in a heated altercation at a petrol station where the film crew were threatened to stop filming and rocks were thrown at the presenters' vehicles as they were driving away.

=== Malaysia ===
Minister Abdul Raman Suliman criticised Clarkson for his commentary on the Perodua Kelisa, who said it was "made in a jungle clearing by someone who went to work on an ox", as well as more negative reception off the show.

=== Germany ===
During the first episode of series seven, a news segment featuring BMW's Mini concept from the Tokyo Motor Show showcased a car that Hammond quoted as supposedly being "quintessentially British", the only added feature being an integrated tea set. Clarkson responded by mocking the car and saying that they should retaliate by building a car that was "quintessentially German". He suggested adding trafficators that displayed Nazi salutes, "a sat-nav that only goes to Poland", and "ein fanbelt that will last a thousand years!" These statements gained negative attention from the German government, and led to viewers' complaints reaching the BBC Board of Governors.

In July 2006, the BBC Governors' Programme Complaints Committee rejected the protests: "the Committee did not believe that, when looking at the audience as a whole, they would have felt that the comments were anything more than Jeremy Clarkson using outrageous behaviour to amuse his audience, and that the remarks would not have led to anyone entertaining new or different feelings or concerns about Germans or Germany".

=== Romania ===
During the opening episode of series 14, the presenters were seen taking the Aston Martin DBS Volante, Ferrari California and Lamborghini Gallardo LP560-4 Spyder on a road trip to Romania. While driving through the Romanian countryside, Clarkson commented on Romania as being "Borat country, with gypsies and Russian playboys", referring to the 2006 mockumentary starring Sacha Baron Cohen about the fictional journalist from Kazakhstan, which had filmed a few scenes in Romania. The mockumentary had already stirred controversy in the country, with a number of local Roma who were involved in the film attempting to sue 20th Century Fox and Cohen. Romanian newspapers claimed that the comments by Clarkson were "offensive" and "bad publicity for their country".

The Romanian Times also reported that Clarkson called Romania a "gypsy land". Complaints were also rife regarding Clarkson's actions to don a pork pie hat which he called a "gypsy" hat, while commenting: "I'm wearing this hat so the gypsies think I am [another gypsy]." The Romanian ambassador later sent a letter to the producers of Top Gear, in which he showed his appreciation for the show, highlighted the press's freedom of expression, the non-discriminatory spirit, and the fact that 89.5% of the country's population is Romanian, 6.5% is ethnic Hungarians, 2.5% are ethnic Roma and 1.5% are other ethnic groups. He also asked for the show to be re-edited for future showings to exclude the offensive material.

The Daily Telegraph was hacked by a group of Romanians, who stated, "We are sick of being misrepresented as Gypsies, and thanks to Top Gear, have been publicly insulted". The group took over two pages of the website, covering them in Romanian flags and playing "Lonely Shepherd" by Gheorghe Zamfir (featured on the soundtrack from the film Kill Bill).

=== Mexico ===
During the second episode of series 16, the presenters mocked the Mastretta MXT, a Mexican sports car, on account of it being designed in Mexico. James May introduced the car as "The Tortilla", then remarked that he did not remember what it was called. Hammond then stated: "Cars reflect national characteristics [...] a Mexican car's just going to be a lazy, feckless, flatulent oaf with a moustache, leaning against a fence asleep, looking at a cactus with a blanket with a hole in the middle on as a coat". This was followed up by James May suggesting that all Mexican food resembles "refried sick" and "sick with cheese on it", Richard Hammond remarking, "I'm sorry, but just imagine waking up and remembering you're Mexican" and Jeremy Clarkson adding, "It'd be brilliant because you could just go straight back to sleep again!" Clarkson ended the segment by suggesting that the Mexican ambassador to Britain would be too lazy to make any kind of complaint. This prompted the Mexican ambassador, Eduardo Medina Mora, to write to the BBC: "The presenters of the program resorted to outrageous, vulgar and inexcusable insults to stir bigoted feelings against the Mexican people, their culture as well as their official representative in the United Kingdom. These offensive, xenophobic and humiliating remarks only serve to reinforce negative stereotypes and perpetuate prejudice against Mexico and its people".

BBC issued a letter defending the jokes, stating that national stereotyping was a part of British humour, but apologizing to the Mexican ambassador for the remarks made about him personally. The episode had the Mexican comments cut from its broadcast in the United States.

Comedian Steve Coogan, who has appeared on the show three times, criticised the programme for its pitiful apology, suggesting that the usual defence of "a bit of a laugh", or "harmless fun" was no longer appropriate, that the insults had gone too far, and described the comments as "as funny as a cold sweat followed by shooting pains down the left arm". He also criticised the show for what he described as lazy, adolescent humour and "casual racism" in reference specifically to this episode. Yahoo editor, Richard Evans, described the programme's conduct as another "Sachsgate waiting to happen".

However, Mastretta appeared to brush off the insults, with general director Carlos Mastretta clarifying that the car was simply used as a pretext for the jokes, and that the controversy has increased interest in the MXT.

The presenters made repeated reference to the incident in the following episodes of the series: The set of the 41st series of Have I Got News for You, which depicts various recent news stories, includes a mocked-up image of Clarkson dressed like a Mexican in reference to the controversy. Further reference to the incident was made in the India special, where Hammond "accidentally" painted a Mexican flag on his car after he intended to paint an Indian one. The incident was made reference to yet again in the second episode of series 19, in which the presenters had to race three high-performance cars from Palm Springs to the Mexican border, where the last person to arrive would have to do a review of the MXT in an upcoming episode, which aired as part of the fourth episode of series 19.

However the UK broadcast regulator Ofcom cleared the programme due to its "comedic intent and the context":

In this case, Ofcom took into account that Top Gear is well known for its irreverent style and sometimes outspoken humour, as well as the regular format of the studio banter between the three presenters. We considered that viewers of Top Gear were likely to be aware that the programme frequently uses national stereotypes as a comedic trope and that there were few, if any, nationalities that had not at some point been the subject of the presenters' mockery throughout the history of this long running programme. For example, this same episode featured a competition between the UK's Top Gear presenters and their Australian counterparts, throughout which the Australians were ridiculed for various national traits. In this instance, therefore, Ofcom considered that the majority of the audience would be familiar with the presenters' approach to mocking, playground-style humour, and would have considered that applying that approach to national stereotypes was in keeping with the programme's usual content, and the presenters' typical style. Ofcom was of the view that the majority of the audience would therefore be likely to have understood that the comments were being made for comic effect.

=== Argentina ===
In September and October 2014, the three presenters and a crew of 29 people were recording the Patagonia Special in Argentina, featuring three cars—a Porsche 928 GT, a Lotus Esprit and a Ford Mustang Mach I. They had started in Bariloche on 19 September and travelled southward on the trans-Patagonian Route 40, about 1,000 miles (1,600 km). On 2 October they had arrived in Ushuaia, at the southern end of Tierra del Fuego. The plan was to film for three more days, and then to continue in Chile.

During filming, Twitter comments began to appear alleging the number plate "H982 FKL" on the Porsche was a reference to the Falklands War. Andy Wilman, executive producer for the show, said on 2 October: "Top Gear production purchased three cars for a forthcoming programme; to suggest that this car was either chosen for its number plate, or that an alternative number plate was substituted for the original is completely untrue"; Clarkson tweeted: "For once, we did nothing wrong". "H982 FKL" has been registered to the Porsche since its manufacture in May 1991.

In the evening, Falklands veterans and other Argentinians entered the hotel lobby to confront the team. Clarkson later wrote he "had to hide under a bed for a mob howling for his blood". Local police then told the team they could not and would not give them any assistance, and in the hostile atmosphere the team decided to leave Argentina. Believing that the presenters were the main targets of the controversy, the crew decided to send Clarkson, May, Hammond and the women from the crew to Buenos Aires, while the rest would drive the cars and their equipment to the border into Chile. May later stated that, prior to flying back to Britain, he and the other presenters had assisted in planning possible airlifts if the journey to the border became too dangerous. The main Route 3, by which they had arrived in Rio Grande a day earlier, was closed to them because the ringway was filled with people, with "the mayor in front". They drove to the border at Radman by tertiary roads, about 160 mi (250 km). In Tolhuin, after 62 mi (100 km), the convoy was stopped by an intimidating crowd, who threw eggs, rocks, and sticks. The team decided to abandon the three show cars, and reached the border with Chile later that night. At 2 a.m., they had to find a tractor to ford the camera cars through the river border. Pictures show that the abandoned cars had been attacked and damaged with stones. The Porsche now bears the number plate "H1 VAE". However, over the years various humorous number plate changes had been made, for example referring to James May's age. Alternative number plates with the letters BE11 END for 'Bell End' were reportedly also discovered in the abandoned Porsche by the Argentinian authorities. Additionally the original dealer has stated that the production team were aware of the registration plate history before purchase.

On 31 October 2014, it was announced that Argentine ambassador Alicia Castro met BBC Director of Television Danny Cohen to demand a formal apology, but the BBC refused to do so, making it clear that they intended to broadcast the special as a fair representation of the events that occurred. The Christmas Special, split into two parts, aired on 27 and 28 December 2014.

== Tesla Roadster review ==
During episode seven of series 12, Clarkson presented a segment featuring the Tesla Roadster, including a test drive. The segment showed the car's provided batteries running flat after 88.5 kilometres (55.0 mi), with Clarkson claiming that the recharge would take 16 hours. Following this, he claimed that the car then broke down. A Tesla Motors spokesperson stated that the cars provided never reached less than 20% charge, none needed to be pushed off the track at any point, the recharge time was 3.5 hours, and the brake failure shown in the segment was actually a blown fuse. The BBC responded to these claims with a statement saying, "The tested Tesla was filmed being pushed into the shed in order to show what would happen if the Roadster had run out of charge. Top Gear stands by the findings in this film and is content that it offers a fair representation of the Tesla's performance on the day it was tested", without addressing the other concerns.

The comments were made following Clarkson showing a limp windmill, and complaining that it would take countless hours to recharge the car, using such a source of electricity. A BBC spokeswoman said several times in an interview that Top Gear was "an entertainment programme, and should not be taken seriously." After several weeks, Clarkson wrote a blog for The Times, acknowledging that "the film we had shot was a bit of a mess", but defending the film's claims. Elon Musk, CEO of Tesla, wrote in a blog on 13 February 2013 that while delivering the vehicle the Tesla team found on a table a prepared script for the segment, demonstrating this was never a fair test. In March 2011 Tesla Motors filed a suit accusing the BBC of libel.

In court Tesla Motors lost a major part of its high court libel claim on 19 October 2011. Justice Tugendhat said that no Top Gear viewer would have reasonably compared the car's performance on the show's airfield track to its likely performance on a public road. On 28 October 2011 the carmaker looked set to lose the remaining malicious falsehood claim, Justice Tugendhat saying "I shall strike out the claim in this action unless the plea of damage is amended by agreement between the parties, or with the permission of the court." Tesla's court action was dismissed by the Court of Appeal in 2013.

Clarkson's popularity made him highly influential. Termed the "Clarkson Effect", his reviews were sometimes blamed for negatively affecting the motor industry. Most infamously, he was implicated in causing poor reception towards the Vauxhall Vectra B and MG Rover in its final years.

== Suspension and dismissal of Jeremy Clarkson from Top Gear ==
In March 2015, the BBC announced Jeremy Clarkson had been suspended for allegedly punching a producer over a confrontation regarding cold food and long filming hours, and that the remaining episodes of the series would not be broadcast. In response to this, over 1,000,000 people signed an online petition to try to get the BBC to reinstate Clarkson. Perry McCarthy, a former Stig, criticised the BBC's decision to pull the next episode from the schedule. On 25 March, the BBC announced that they would not renew Clarkson's contract which finished at the end of March 2015. Following the official decision, James May and Richard Hammond presented their resignation to the BBC in solidarity with their partner and in order to pursue further ventures together. This would lead to the creation of The Grand Tour.

The show received widespread criticism after Jeremy Clarkson's contract was not renewed, addressing the importance of the confrontation but remarking the severity of the decision. Chris Evans, a car enthusiast with prior TV-presenter experience, alongside a host of new presenters, took over as the lead for Series 23 before resigning after widespread criticism.

== Presenting style, behaviour and departure of Chris Evans ==
Following Clarkson, Hammond and May's departures they were replaced for the 23rd series of the show with a new set of presenters led by radio DJ and TV presenter Chris Evans and actor Matt LeBlanc. During the earlier months of 2016, Evans' behaviour behind the scenes became a central focus by media websites and newspapers, who were quoted as claiming that he was "out of control" with the work of revamping the show. This came after Lisa Clark, an executive producer brought in to replace Andy Wilman following his resignation from Top Gear, quit the show in December 2015, a few months after being assigned to assist in the new format. Also leaving the show during this period were script editor Tom Ford and the then boss of BBC Two, Kim Shillinglaw. His behaviour was considered problematic, most particularly with Clark, after a source claimed that Evans felt undermined by her during a meeting he attended, when she pointed out that he still had more films to complete than just the one he had done with Jenson Button, while another source revealed that the choice of Matt LeBlanc being Evans' co-host was down to Clark and not Evans, who simply uttered when hearing the choice from her: "He's old hat, what do we want him for?" On his Twitter account, after hearing the news of Clark's sudden departure, comedian Bob Mortimer commented on whether Tony Hall would live up to a promise to clamp down on BBC stars that were abusing their power following the stories emerging on Evans' behaviour. Rumours also emerged that LeBlanc was clashing with his co-host behind the scenes because they did not get on well, to the point that he threatened to leave unless Evans went, but these were dismissed by him as being rubbish during an interview with Radio Times, who claimed they were made by the "ruthlessness" of British media. During his one series tenure as a host for the show, Evans was criticised greatly by viewers and media critics for his "shouty" presenting style, which many viewers did not like, and the fact that he wore the same clothing during the studio segments of the series, which involved a yellow "Carfest" T-shirt that he wore on TFI Friday beneath a black top.

In July 2016, having presented just one series of the show Evans stepped down from his presenting role on Top Gear posting on social media "Stepping down from Top Gear. Gave it my best shot but sometimes that's not enough.

== Specific criticism ==
=== Series 2 ===
After a segment on the 1953 24 Hours of Le Mans, the programme received criticism for damaging a historic Jaguar C-Type valued at £1 million. Top Gear responded that they had permission to "drive the car hard" but Adrian Hamilton, the car's owner, and Top Gear's test driver had different ideas on what that meant.

=== Series 3 ===
During the fifth episode of series three, Clarkson crashed a Toyota Hilux into a tree, during a segment in which he attempted to prove the sturdiness and reliability of the truck. The tree belonged to the Churchill Parish in Somerset. The villagers presumed that the damage had been accidental, or that someone had vandalised the tree, until the Top Gear episode was broadcast. After the BBC was contacted, the director of Top Gear admitted guilt and the broadcaster paid compensation.

=== Series 5 ===
The show was criticised by the Mountaineering Council for Scotland when Clarkson drove a Land Rover Discovery to the summit of Cnoc an Fhreiceadain, damaging the terrain as he did so.

=== Series 8 ===
During the news segment of episode 7, Clarkson states the show received 150 complaints over a caravan being set alight for a publicity stunt.

=== Series 9 ===
The BBC apologised to a number of Top Gear viewers following comments made during the first episode of series nine. Clarkson asked Hammond following his 370 km/h (230 mph) crash, "Are you now a mental?", which was followed by James May offering Richard Hammond a tissue "in case he dribbled". The BBC claimed the comments were meant as a joke, but also claimed they saw how the comments could cause offence to mentally disabled and brain-damaged viewers.

During the show's American Special, the show received 91 complaints regarding a dead cow being tied to the roof of Jeremy Clarkson's Camaro. It was later revealed by the BBC that the cow had died several days previously and Clarkson had caused no harm or injury to it.

Episode five of series nine was criticised for Jeremy Clarkson's reconstruction of a train crash that occurred in Hibaldstow, North Lincolnshire, near Scunthorpe. The incident was mainly criticised due to its insensitivity regarding the Cumbria train crash that occurred only two days earlier. The reconstruction, which was organised by Network Rail as part of its Don't Run The Risk campaign, was criticised by Anthony Smith, chief executive of the rail watchdog Passenger Focus, who said: "We need to raise awareness of the issue, but now is not the right time." It was reported that the item had already been delayed several times, due to an earlier fatal level-crossing crash. The BBC defended their decision to broadcast the episode, claiming that "with only one programme remaining in the series, and the frequency of level-crossing accidents, it may have been considered that there was no "appropriate" time to show the film without it "offending" somebody. A repeat of the episode was due to be aired on 1 March 2007, but due to the earlier complaints, and another death on a level crossing earlier that morning, was replaced with a new edition of "The Best of Top Gear".

During the show's Polar special at the end of series nine, Jeremy Clarkson was shown drinking gin and tonic while driving through an ice field in the Arctic. Despite the producers' and Clarkson's claims that they were in international waters at the time, the BBC Trust found that the scene could 'glamorise the misuse of alcohol', and that the scene "was not editorially justified in the context of a family show pre-watershed".

=== Series 10 ===
During the show's Botswana special, a spokesperson for the Environmental Investigation Agency criticised the BBC for leaving tracks in Botswana's Makgadikgadi salt pan. The BBC denied that they had gone near any conservation areas, and asserted that they had followed the advice of environmental experts.

Anti-smoking campaigners criticised the show after Clarkson and May smoked Porsche-branded tobacco pipes inside the studio.

=== Series 11 ===
Episode 5 of the series saw Clarkson, Hammond and the Ledbury Fox Hunt green laning, with Clarkson in a Daihatsu off roader trailing a cloth covered in "redneck juice" (fox urine and glands) from the tow bar. Hunt saboteurs criticised the film for "showing fox hunting in a good light".

=== Series 12 ===
Following the first episode of series 12, Jeremy Clarkson was criticised for making a joke regarding lorry drivers killing prostitutes, thought to be alluding to the Ipswich 2006 serial murders, although it is more likely that Clarkson was referring to the Yorkshire Ripper. Ofcom received over 500 complaints, but say that the remark was not in breach of the broadcasting code. Afterwards, Labour MP Chris Mole wrote a "strongly worded" letter to the BBC, saying that Clarkson should be sacked regarding the remarks. In response to the complaints on the show, Clarkson announced he would apologise, but later revealed that he was, in fact, apologising for not posting the lap time of a car that was shown on the previous episode. The incident was referenced when Stephen Fry appeared as the Star in a Reasonably Priced Car in July 2009. Clarkson introduced the interview by stating that Fry had "begun his career with a Lorry (Laurie), so the one thing we can be certain he hasn't done is killed a prostitute".

=== Series 13 ===
During the final episode of series 13, Clarkson and May were assigned to produce a spoof advert for the new Volkswagen Scirocco. However, one of their spoof ads saw crowds of people leaving Warsaw in terror on buses and trains, because of the imminent German invasion of Poland. At the end of the advert, Clarkson announced "Volkswagen Scirocco TDI: Berlin to Warsaw in one tank". The advert was uploaded to YouTube minutes after its broadcast, spurring angry comments from Polish viewers. A spokeswoman for the show said that the BBC had only received a handful of complaints, but complaints submitted to national broadcast watchdog Ofcom were expected to be higher. Complaints were also received for three other incidents in the programme: a remake of a VW advertisement, in which a suicide is shown on-screen; Clarkson mocking people who have autism, and the use of the word "pikey", which Clarkson claims to be someone who sells "pegs and heather" to describe drivers of the Vauxhall VXR8.

During a warm-up for filming one of the series' episodes, Clarkson reportedly called then Prime Minister Gordon Brown a "silly cunt". He had previously apologised for calling him a "one-eyed Scottish idiot" during a Q&A in 2009, which angered Scottish politicians and disability groups.

=== Series 15 ===
In a conversation about women distracting the presenters while driving, Clarkson said he recently saw a woman wearing a burka who "tripped over the pavement" and revealed a "red g-string and stockings". Hammond said that this "did not happen", but Clarkson maintained that it was true. A Mediawatch spokesperson said Clarkson "should learn to keep quiet". However, one reporter defended Clarkson.

Clarkson's comment about the Ferrari F430 Speciale being "speciale needs" was ruled offensive by Ofcom.

Clarkson angered gay rights campaigners after he said off air during a segment that he reserved the right "to not be bummed". It was revealed by guest Alistair Campbell on Twitter.

=== Series 16 ===
The BBC received 600 complaints following the third episode of series 16, in which the presenters 'murdered' a fat Albanian and attempted to find out which of three car boots he would fit into the best. The episode was also criticised for its stereotypical views on Albania, claiming it is a nest for Albanian mafia car thieves.

In the show's Middle East special, the depiction of a baby Stig as Jesus and the use of niqabs by the trio to disguise themselves were criticised by Catholics and Muslims.

Ofcom received 19 complaints after the show had the presenters undertake a drive-by shooting on a cardboard cut-out of the Stig during the East Coast Road Trip.

=== Series 17 ===
This episode showed Clarkson and May parking their electric cars in disabled parking spaces. Later the BBC defended its stars, stating that they had permission from the owners to park in the disabled spaces. A later scene showed people pushing the electric Nissan Leaf up a street while Clarkson made jokes about it having run out of charge. Nissan later discovered from onboard data logging that before the "test drive" its charge had been run down to only 40% capacity. Since then Top Gear has received criticism from electric car enthusiasts, newspapers, celebrities, and Nissan in response to their view on electric cars.

=== Series 18 ===
Jeremy Clarkson was found to have breached BBC guidelines after comparing a modified Toyota Prius to the Elephant Man.

=== Series 19 ===
In an unaired version of Jeremy Clarkson reviewing the Toyota GT86 and the similar Subaru BRZ, he uses eeny meeny miny moe to pick between the two cars, which has historically included the word "nigger". He mumbles through that part of the rhyme, and the Daily Mirror accused him of mumbling "nigger". In the aired version of the review, he says the word 'teacher' instead of the racial epithet.

After denying the incident, once video evidence surfaced, Clarkson issued the following apology, though maintaining that he did not use the word.

Ordinarily I don't respond to newspaper allegations but on this occasion I feel I must make an exception. A couple of years ago I recorded an item for Top Gear in which I quote the rhyme "eeny, meeny, miny, moe". Of course, I was well aware that in the best-known version of this rhyme there is a racist expression that I was extremely keen to avoid. The full rushes show that I did three takes. In two, I mumbled where the offensive word would normally occur and in the third I replaced it altogether with the word teacher. Now when I viewed this footage several weeks later I realised that in one of the mumbled versions if you listen very carefully with the sound turned right up it did appear that I'd actually used the word I was trying to obscure. I was mortified by this, horrified. It is a word I loathe and I did everything in my power to make sure that that version did not appear in the programme that was transmitted.

I have here the note that was sent at the time to the production office and it says: "I didn't use the N-word here but I've just listened through my headphones and it sounds like I did. Is there another take that we could use?

Please be assured I did everything in my power to not use that word, as I'm sitting here begging your forgiveness for the fact my efforts obviously weren't quite good enough, thank you.

Though this incident happened before the 'slope' comment in the Burma special, it did not surface until afterwards and the combined complaints caused many public figures to call for Clarkson to be fired and ultimately resulted in a 'final warning' from the BBC regarding racist remarks.

=== Series 20 ===
The show was criticised by Māori peoples for the filming of a car driving on Ninety Mile Beach, which although it is a public road is considered sacred by Māori tribes.

=== Series 21 ===
The show was investigated by Ofcom after the words "Pikey Peak" was depicted on a placard on the show, as "pikey" is a pejorative for people of the Traveller community.

Complaints of food wastage were made to the BBC regarding the supermarket segment of the 80s hot hatches challenge.

In the show's Burma special, the presenters go across Burma and Thailand in lorries with the goal of building a bridge over the river Kwai. After building a bridge over the Kok River, Clarkson is quoted as saying "That is a proud moment, but there's a slope on it." as a native crosses the bridge, "slope" being a pejorative for Asians. This led to a complaint from a law firm acting on behalf of Indian-born actress Somi Guha.

Top Gear Executive Producer Andy Wilman responded:

When we used the word slope in the recent Top Gear Burma Special it was a light-hearted word play joke referencing both the build quality of the bridge and the local Asian man who was crossing it. We were not aware at the time, and it has subsequently been brought to our attention, that the word slope is considered by some to be offensive and although it might not be widely recognised in the UK, we appreciate that it can be considered offensive to some here and overseas, for example in Australia and the USA. If we had known that at the time we would not have broadcast the word in this context and regret any offence caused.

=== Series 22 ===
The show was criticised for staging a crash with two Peugeots near to where a woman died in a head-on collision in 2010, who was also driving a Peugeot.

=== Series 23 ===
During the first series after Clarkson, May and Hammond's departure, the BBC came under criticism for filming Ken Block speeding and performing doughnuts near the London Cenotaph but defended the decision to film there by saying "The filming took place a respectful distance away from the Cenotaph and it was all agreed with Westminster council in advance."

=== Series 27 ===
The show received some criticism when a rare Matra Bagheera was significantly damaged during a feature in which the driver Paddy McGuinness and Freddie Flintoff filmed in Borneo. At the time of filming there were only 5 road worthy examples of this model in existence.
