= Friends, Families and Travellers =

British charity for the Gypsy, Roma, and Traveller community

Organisation's logo

Friends, Families and Travellers is a registered charity in the United Kingdom. It campaigns against discrimination against Gypsies, Roma and Travellers in the UK.

== Actions ==
The group has accused Channel 4's 2010–2015 series Big Fat Gypsy Weddings and its 2020 Dispatches programme "The Truth About Traveller Crime" as promoting discrimination against Gypsies and Travellers.

In July 2021, during the COVID-19 pandemic in the United Kingdom, it conducted a survey which found that 74% of GP surgeries they visited in March and April broke NHS England guidance by refusing to register nomadic patients. The charity has also noted that the pandemic brought awareness to, and exacerbated, existing inequalities relating to Gypsy and Traveller communities.

In 2021, it campaigned against the Police, Crime, Sentencing and Courts Bill, calling its tightened restrictions on unauthorised campsites as "draconian" and an infringement on nomadic people's human rights. Ivy Manning, the group's engagement officer, said: "people living roadside will soon be caught in a catch-22 of potentially facing prison or being forced to move into bricks and mortar" and that "entire lives could be criminalised for exercising the right to roam and live nomadically". Following these concerns, Cambridge City Council pledged to stand "in solidarity" with Gypsies and Travellers. The group has also claimed that traditional events such as the Appleby Horse Fair will no longer be allowed to occur under the provisions of the bill.

After it was revealed that Pontins had blacklisted people with Irish surnames from its holiday sites in order to prevent Irish Travellers using the sites, the group argued that such barring of Gypsies and Travellers from holiday camps, pubs and across the UK was commonplace.

== See also ==
- Crystal's Vardo
- The Traveller Movement
