= Pikey =

British pejorative term referring to a person from the Traveller community

Pikey (/ˈpaɪkiː/; also spelled pikie, pykie) is a derogatory slang term referring to Gypsy, Roma and Traveller people. It is used mainly in the United Kingdom and in Ireland to refer to people who belong to groups which had a traditional travelling lifestyle. Groups referred to with this term include Irish Travellers, Romanichal, Welsh Kale, Scottish Lowland Travellers, Scottish Highland Travellers, and Funfair Travellers. These groups consider the term to be highly derogatory.

It is used by extension as a classist insult against marginalised working class communities, similar to the term chav.

== Etymology ==
The term "pikey" is possibly derived from "pike" which, c. 1520, meant "highway" and is related to the words turnpike (toll road) and pikeman (toll collector). In Robert Henryson's Fable Collection (late 15th century), in the fable of the Two Mice, the thieving mice are referred to on more than one occasion as "pykeris":

And in the samin thay went, but mair abaid,
Withoutin fyre or candill birnand bricht
For commonly sic pykeris luffis not lycht.

And together they went, but more about,
without fire or candle burning bright
For commonly, such thieves do not like light.

== 19th century and 20th century ==
Charles Dickens in 1837 writes disparagingly of itinerant pike-keepers.

The Oxford English Dictionary traced the earliest use of "pikey" to The Times in August 1838, which referred to strangers who had come to the Isle of Sheppey as "pikey-men". In 1847, J. O. Halliwell in his Dictionary of Archaic and Provincial Words recorded the use of "pikey" to mean a gypsy. In 1887, W. D. Parish and W. F. Shaw in the Dictionary of Kentish Dialect recorded the use of the word to mean "a turnpike traveller; a vagabond; and so generally a low fellow".

Thomas Acton's Gypsy Politics and Social Change notes John Camden Hotten's Slang Dictionary (1887) as similarly stating:

Hotten's dictionary of slang gives pike at as go away and Pikey as a tramp or a Gypsy. He continues a pikey-cart is, in various parts of the country, one of those habitable vehicles suggestive of country life. Possibly the term has some reference to those who continually use the pike or turnpike road.

The Journal of the Gypsy Lore Society similarly agrees the term pikey solely applied (negatively) to Romani people.

== Contemporary usage ==
Pikey remained, as of 1989, common prison slang for Romani people or those who have a similar lifestyle of itinerant unemployment and travel. More recently, pikey was applied to Irish Travellers (other slurs include tinkers) and non-Romanichal travellers. In the late 20th century, it came to be used to describe "a lower-class person, regarded as coarse or disreputable".

The most common contemporary use of pikey is not as a term for the Romani ethnic group, but as a catch-all phrase to refer to people, of any ethnic group, who travel around with no fixed abode. Among British Romani Gypsies the term pikey refers to a Traveller who is not of Romani descent. It may also refer to a member who has been cast out of the family.

In the late 20th and early 21st centuries, the definition became even looser and is sometimes used to refer to a wide section of the (generally urban) underclass of the country (in England generally known as chavs), or merely a person of any social class who "lives on the cheap" such as a bohemian. It is also used as an adjective, e.g. "a pikey estate" or "a pikey pub". Following complaints from Travellers' groups about racism, when the term was used by presenter Jeremy Clarkson as a pun for Pike's Peak in the television programme Top Gear, the Editorial Standards Committee of the BBC Trust ruled that, in this instance, the term merely meant "cheap". In doing so, it justified the ascribed meaning by quoting the Wikipedia article for the term.

In 2003 the Firle Bonfire Society burned an effigy of a family of gypsies inside a caravan after travellers damaged local land. The number plate on the caravan read "P1KEY". A storm of protests and accusations of racism rapidly followed. Twelve members of the society were arrested but the Crown Prosecution Service decided that there was insufficient evidence to proceed on a charge of "incitement to racial hatred".

In 2014, Plymouth band Mad Dog McRea released a song "Pikey killed my goldfish" on their Alive EP.

The Oxford History of English refers to:

young people who use charver or pikey to identify a contemporary style of dress or general demeanour suggest an aimless "street" lifestyle, unaware of the Romani origin of the first or of connotation with "gypsy" of the second.

Pikey, formed from turnpike roads, as along with pikee and piker been used in the South East [of England] especially since the mid-19th-century to refer to itinerant people of all kinds and been used by travelling people to refer to those of low caste. Scally a corresponding label originating in the North West of England was taken up by the media and several websites, only to be superseded by chav.

A very recent survey has unearthed 127 synonyms, with ned favoured in Scotland, charver in North East England and pikey across the South [of England].

== See also ==
- Chav
- Eshay
- Didicoy
- New Age travellers
- Trailer trash

== Sources ==
- John Ayto, ed. (1999). The Oxford Dictionary of Slang. Oxford University Press. ISBN 0-19-863157-X.
- T. F. Hoad, ed. (1986). The Concise Oxford Dictionary of English Etymology. Oxford University Press. ISBN 0-19-283098-8.
- Tony Thorne (1990). Bloomsbury Dictionary of Contemporary Slang. Bloomsbury Publishing Plc. ISBN 0-7475-4594-4.
