= Irish Travellers =

Mincéirí; An lucht siúil
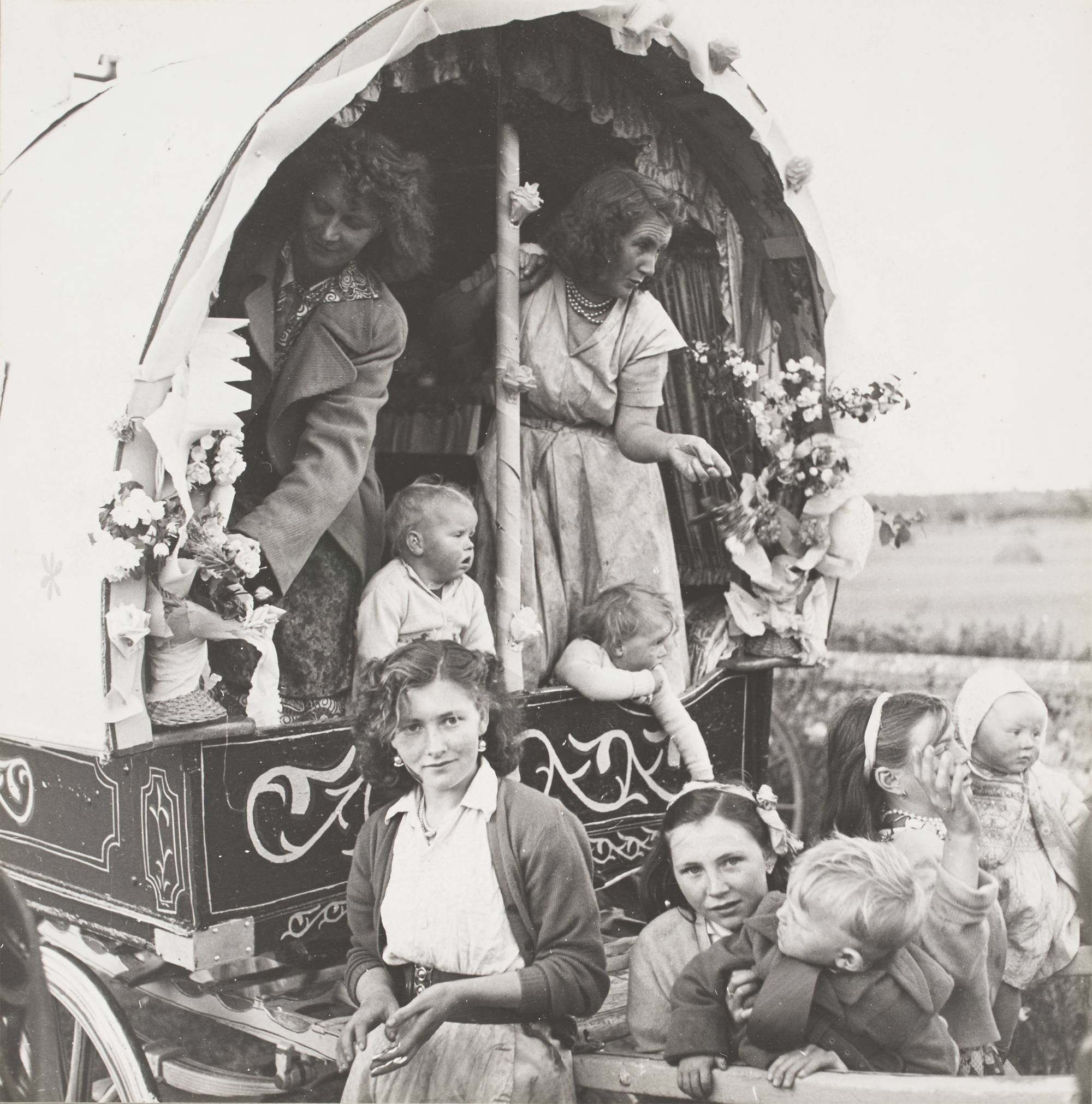
- Irish Travellers in 1954

Regions with significant populations
- Throughout Ireland, especially in Counties Galway, Mayo, Longford, and Limerick, and Dublin • Northern Ireland • London, UK •
- Republic of Ireland: 32,949 (2022)
- Northern Ireland: 2,609 (2021)
- United States: 7,000–40,000 (2010s–2020s estimate)
- United Kingdom: 65,000

Languages
- Hiberno-English, Irish, Shelta

Religion
- Predominantly Roman Catholic

Related ethnic groups
- Irish, Irish Traveller Americans

Irish Travellers (Irish: An lucht siúil, meaning the walking people), also known as Mincéirs (Shelta: Mincéirí) or Pavees, are a traditionally peripatetic indigenous ethno-cultural group originating in Ireland.

They are predominantly English-speaking, though many also speak Shelta, a language of mixed English and Irish origin. The majority of Irish Travellers are Roman Catholic, the predominant religion in the Republic of Ireland. They are one of several groups identified as "Travellers" in the UK and Ireland. Irish Travellers have distinctive artistic traditions, some of which have influenced the broader cultural tapestry of Ireland. Irish Traveller music, known for its lively and virtuosic melodies, is a significant and influential part of Ireland's musical landscape. Irish Travellers have clothing traditions which are distinct from those of the wider Irish population. Beady pockets for example are a feature of traditional Irish Traveller attire—flat, pocket-sized pouches characterised by intricate embroidery and beadwork.

Despite sometimes being incorrectly referred to as "Gypsies", Irish Travellers are not genetically related to the Romani people, who are of Indo-Aryan origin. Genetic analysis has shown Irish Travellers to be of Irish descent, and that they likely diverged from the settled Irish population in the 1600s, probably during the time of the Cromwellian conquest of Ireland. Centuries of cultural isolation have led Travellers to become genetically distinct from the settled Irish. Traveller rights groups have long advocated for Traveller ethnicity status from the Irish government, succeeding in 2017.

Irish Traveller communities are located in Ireland, the United Kingdom, the United States and Canada. In 2016, there were 32,302 Travellers within Ireland. In 2016, they were 0.7% of Ireland's population. There are different estimates about the size of the total population of people with Traveller ancestry, because many people of Traveller descent do not declare themselves Travellers. The United Kingdom is believed to be home to up to 300,000 Roma and Traveller people, including Romanichal. The British Government considers Travellers resident in the UK to form part of the Gypsy, Roma and Traveller (GRT) community.

== Nomenclature ==
Travellers refer to themselves in Shelta as Mincéirí, or in Irish as an lucht siúil ("the walking people").

== Origins ==
There are numerous theories and oral histories surrounding the origins of Irish Travellers as a distinct group. Research has been complicated by the fact that the group appears to have no written records of its own, with oral tradition through storytelling being the primary method through which the Traveller community disseminates its own history and culture.

Deeper documentation of Shelta and the Travellers dates to the 1830s, but knowledge of Irish Travellers has been seen from the 1100s, as well as the 1500s–1800s. Many decrees against begging in England were directed at Travellers, passed by King Edward VI around 1551. For example, the "Acte for tynckers and pedlers". The culture of Irish Travellers resembles the culture of other itinerant communities with regard to self-employment, family networks, birth, marriage, and burial rituals, taboos, and folklore. They worked with metal and travelled throughout Ireland making items such as ornaments, jewellery, and horse harnesses to earn a living. As a result, they, along with other itinerant groups, were referred to as "tinkers" or "tinklers", meaning "tin smiths", terms regarded in later years as derogatory.

=== Origin theories ===
Different theories have been put forward to explain the origins of Ireland's itinerant population. It has been suggested Travellers are related to Romani due to a similarly itinerant lifestyle, but genetic testing has shown no evidence for a recent ancestral component between Irish Travellers and Romani Travellers. There is a theory that an indigenous, itinerant community of craftsmen are the ancestors of Travellers, who never settled down. Other speculations on their origin are that they were descended from those Irish who were made homeless during the Cromwellian conquest in the 1650s, or made homeless in either the 1741 or the 1840s famine, or due to eviction in the Scottish Highlands.

According to Helleiner (2003), current scholarship is investigating the background of Gaelic Ireland before the English Tudor conquest. The mobile nature and traditions of a Gaelic society based on pastoralism rather than land tenure before this event, implies that Travellers represent descendants of the Gaelic social order marginalised during the change-over to an English landholding society. An early example of this mobile element in the population, and how displacement of clans can lead to increased nomadism within aristocratic warrior societies, is the displacement of the Clan Murtough O'Connors after the Norman invasion.

=== Population genetics ===
In 2000, genetic evidence reported regarding Irish Travellers supported Irish ancestry; several distinct subpopulations; and the distinctiveness of the midland counties due to Viking influence. In 2011, researchers at the Royal College of Surgeons in Dublin and the University of Edinburgh analysed DNA samples from 40 Travellers. The study provided evidence that Irish Travellers are a genetically separate Irish ethnic minority which has been distinct from the settled Irish community for at least 1,000 years: The report claimed that Travellers are as distinct from the settled community as Icelanders are from Norwegians.

In 2017, a genetic study using profiles of 50 Irish Travellers, 143 European Roma, 2,232 settled Irish, 2,039 British and 6,255 European or worldwide individuals, confirmed ancestral origins from within the general population of Ireland. An estimated time of divergence between the settled population and Travellers was set at a minimum of 8 generations ago, with generations at 30 years, hence 240 years and a maximum of 14 generations or 420 years ago. The best fit was estimated at 360 years ago, giving an approximate date in the 1650s.

Irish Travellers are not an entirely homogeneous group, instead reflecting some of the variation also seen in the settled population. Four distinct genetic clusters were identified in the 2017 study, and these match social groupings within the community.

Irish Travellers, particularly those that experienced a life of nomadism prior to the 2002 Irish legislation that altered living conditions, exhibit distinct gut microbiota compared to other Irish citizens, which is comparable to gut microbiomes observed in non-industrialized societies.

==== Genetic disease studies ====
Genetic studies have identified certain diseases such as Galactosemia, Cystic Fibrosis, Alpha-1 anti-trypsin deficiency, Hereditary Haemochromatosis and Phenylketonuria that are more common in Ireland than the rest of Europe.

Ireland has the highest incidence of Transferase Deficient Galactosemia (TDG) in the world at 1:30 000 compared to 1:30 000 to 40 000 in Europe, and 1:1 000,000 in Japan. However within the Irish traveller community, the incidence is even higher at 1:480. This autosomal recessive inherited disorder is caused by a mutation in the Galactose-1-phosphate uridyltransferase (GALT) gene which leads to a deficiency in GALT. Over 150 different GALT gene mutations have been identified. The most common in Europe is Q188R, (64%) and Ireland (93.6%). However, Q188R is the sole mutation found in the Irish Traveller group.

Murphy, McHugh, et al. postulated two main hypotheses, speculating whether:

- the increased prevalence of genetic diseases resulted from marriages made largely within and among the Traveller community (eg consanguinity),

or

- suggested a shared descent from an original Irish carrier long ago with ancestors unrelated to the rest of the Irish population.

In their conclusion Murphy, McHugh, et al. write that:

The fact that Q188R is the sole mutant allele among the Travellers as compared to the non-Traveller group may be the result of a founder effect in the isolation of a small group of the Irish population from their peers as founders of the Traveller sub-population. This would favour the second, endogenous, hypothesis of Traveller origins."

David T. Croke states that there is "little apart from anecdotal evidence" to support the idea that the high incidence of endogamous marriage within the traveller community being the cause of the increased incidence of inherited disease amongst it. Instead he states:

"A number of lines of evidence support the 'endogenous' hypothesis of Traveller origins, namely that the Travellers are descended from a genetic isolate derived from the population of the island of Ireland which, over time, has evolved an ethnic identity distinct from that of the general population."

== Language ==
Irish Travellers speak English and sometimes one of two dialects of Shelta—Gammon (or Gamin) and Irish Traveller Cant. Shelta has been dated back to the 18th century but may be older. Cant, which derives from Irish, is a combination of English and Shelta.

Jean-Pierre Liégeois writes that the Irish Traveller Gammon vocabulary is derived from pre-13th-century Gaelic idioms, with a 10% Romani language vocabulary of Indian origin. Since Shelta is a mixture of English and Irish grammar, the etymology is not straightforward. The language is made up mostly of Irish lexicon, being classified as a grammar-lexicon language, with the grammar being English-based. Gaelic language expert Kuno Meyer and Romani language linguist John Sampson both assert that Shelta existed as far back as the 13th century, 300 years before the first Romani populations arrived in Ireland or Britain.

Shelta is a cryptolect (secret language). Irish Travellers do not like to share the language with outsiders, named "Buffers", or non-Travellers. When speaking Shelta in front of Buffers, Travellers will disguise the structure to make it seem like they are not speaking Shelta. There is fear that if outsiders know the entirety of the language, it will be used to bring further discrimination to the Traveller community.

== The Irish state and Irish Travellers ==
There was no specific state focus on Travellers prior to the creation of an independent Irish state in 1922. Issues with traditional travelling groups came under loosely defined vagrancy laws, from when Ireland was part of the United Kingdom. In 1959, the 1959–1963 government of Ireland established a "Commission on Itinerancy" in response to calls to deal with the "itinerant problem". This was made up of senior representatives of the Irish state, judges, Gardaí (Irish police), religious organisations and numerous farming lobby groups such as Macra na Feirme. The commission had no Traveller representatives, and while attempts were made to consult Travellers, these were "bizarre" unannounced visits which resulted in little input into the report.

The commission had the following terms of reference:

1. to enquire into the problem arising from the presence in the country of itinerants in considerable numbers.
2. to examine the economic, educational, health and social problems inherent in their way of life.
3. to consider what steps might be taken—
  1. to provide opportunities for a better way of life for itinerants,
  2. to promote their absorption into the general community,
  3. pending such absorption, to reduce to a minimum the disadvantages to themselves and to the community resulting from their itinerant habits and
  4. to improve the position generally; and
4. to make recommendations.

The commission's 1963 report defined "itinerant" as "a person who had no fixed place of abode and habitually wandered from place to place, but excluding travelling show-people and travelling entertainers". It recommended assimilation of Travellers by settling them in fixed dwellings, with the ultimate aim being that of essentially ending Traveller identity, viewing the Netherlands' approach to its travelling minority as a model. This assimilation was to be achieved by the effective criminalisation of nomadism, and the report paved the way for an increasing state emphasis on criminal laws and penalties for trespass.

At the time, about 60% of Irish Travellers lived in barrel-roofed horse-drawn wagons, with almost 40% using tents in summer, and fewer in winter.

The Travelling People Review Body (1981–1983) advocated integration rather than assimilation, with provision for serviced halting sites. The Body's membership included Travellers. The Task Force on the Travelling Community (1993–1995) moved to an intercultural paradigm.

In May 2019, the Oireachtas (Irish parliament) established a joint committee "on Key Issues affecting the Traveller Community".

In May 2021, the Ombudsman for Children, Niall Muldoon, published a report that was highly critical of the standards of accommodation provided for Travellers, describing some accommodation issues as "deplorable".

In 2025, The Council of Europe Commissioner for Human Rights, Michael O'Flaherty, published a Memorandum on the human rights of Travellers and Roma in Ireland in which he highlights several issues currently facing Travellers in Ireland, including anti-traveller racism and antigypsyism in the criminal and civil justice system, inequalities in access to education, health care and lack of access to culturally appropriate accommodation i.e. nomadism. He discusses the effects the enactment by the Irish Government of the Housing (Miscellaneous Provisions) Act, 2002 has had on traveller living conditions. Section 24 of the Act amended the Criminal Justice and Public Order act 1994 Part IIa to make it a criminal offense for a person to enter or occupy public or private land without consent of the owner. Or bring onto or place any object on land that may substantially damage the land.

Mr O'Flaherty states: "Travellers who breach the requirements of these laws face eviction and possibly imprisonment, and their trailers can be impounded. In many places, boulders have been erected by the local authorities in what used to be traditional halting sites for Travellers. The Commissioner notes that the above-mentioned policies and the continued lack of provision of culturally appropriate accommodation prevents many Travellers from practicing nomadism. Only an estimated 15 - 20% still live in mobile homes or trailers, however, often in substandard and overcrowded conditions such as on unofficial halting sites and without access to water or electricity."

== Population ==
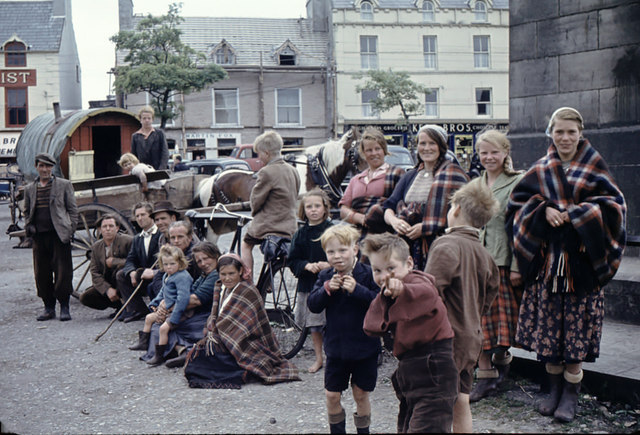
Travellers near the Four Masters monument in Donegal Town, 1958

Irish Travellers have a higher fertility rate than the general Irish population. In 2016, 44.5% of Traveller women aged 40–49 had five or more children, compared to 4.2% of women overall in this age group. This gap has dramatically reduced over time. In 1987, the Irish Traveller birth rate was 5.3 children per woman, compared to the general Irish population's 2.3. In 2008, the Irish Traveller birth rate was 2.9 children per woman, compared to the general Irish population's 2.1.

=== Ireland ===
The 2016 census in the Republic of Ireland reported the number of Irish Travellers as 30,987, up from 29,495 in 2011. In 2006, the number was 22,369. A further 1,700 to 2,000 were estimated to live in Northern Ireland.

From the 2006 Irish census, it was determined that 20,975 dwell in urban areas and 1,460 were living in rural areas. In 2006, they were 0.5% of the population. Some areas had a higher proportion, with high Traveller concentrations in Clare, Dublin, Galway and Limerick. There were 9,301 Travellers in the 0–14 age range, comprising 41.5% of the Traveller population. A further 3,406 of them were in the 15–24 age range, comprising 15.2%. Children in the age range 0–17 comprised 48.7% of the Traveller population.

The 2008 All Ireland Traveller Health Study revised the population for Northern Ireland to 3,905 and that in the Republic to 36,224.

The rural community of Rathkeale, County Limerick, has one of the largest populations of any towns percentage-wise, with around half of its residents having Irish Traveller ancestry. Traveller clans, gangs, and associations or events linked to the Traveller community and culture may often have the name Rathkeale linked with it, such as the Rathkeale Rovers. It is sometimes considered a rural mecca of Travellers in this regard. There are other communities, including in Dublin. Tuam (c. 5% Traveller) and Longford both have significant Traveller communities in rural areas. While not as high proportion-wise, due to its high population in general, Dublin and its suburbs have over 5,000 Travellers, who are 0.4% of Dublin's population proper and 0.2-0.3% of the Greater Dublin population. Ballyfermot, Dublin has a large Traveller community, mostly located in the Labre Park area.

In 2016, County Longford had the highest Traveller percentage rate for the 0-24 age group, of any Irish county, at 5%, followed by County Galway at 3%.

=== Diaspora ===
==== United Kingdom ====
In 2011, for the first time, the census category "Irish Traveller" was introduced as part of the broader Gypsy/Traveller section. While Irish Travellers and Romani Gypsy people are genetically distant from each other, with Travellers having Irish roots, and Roma Gypsies originating in South Asia, they are conflated in the UK Census, so the number of Travellers may be lower than what is reported in this category.

In 2011, the self reported figure for collective Gypsy/Traveller populations was 63,193 but estimates of Irish Travellers living in Great Britain range are about 15,000 as part of a total estimation of over 300,000 Romani and other Traveller groups in the UK. In the 2021 Census of England and Wales, the Gypsy/Irish Traveller community numbered 67,757, or 0.1% of the population.

The London Boroughs of Harrow and Brent contain significant Irish Traveller populations. In addition to those on official sites, a number are settled in local authority housing. These are mostly women, who wish their children to have a chance at formal education. They and the children may or may not travel in the summer, but remain in close contact with the wider Irish Traveller community.

There are also a number of Irish Traveller communities in the Home counties.

==== United States ====
In 1994, there were an estimated 10,000 people in the United States are descendants of Travellers who left Ireland, mostly between 1845 and 1860 during the Great Famine. There are no official population figures regarding Irish Travellers in the United States, as the US census does not recognise them as an ethnic group. While some sources estimate their population in the U.S. to be 10,000, others suggest their population is 40,000. In 1992 research, Irish Travellers in the U.S. divide themselves up into groups that are based on historical residence: Ohio Travellers, Georgia Travellers, Texas Travellers, and Mississippi Travellers. The Georgia Travellers' camp is made up of about eight hundred families, the Mississippi Travellers, about three hundred families, and the Texas Travellers, under fifty families."

The largest and most affluent population of about 2,500 lives in Murphy Village, outside of the town of North Augusta, South Carolina. Other communities exist in Memphis, Tennessee; Hernando, Mississippi; and near White Settlement, Texas; where the families stay in their homes during the winter, and leave during the summer. Smaller enclaves can be found across Georgia, Alabama, and Mississippi.

Irish Travellers in the U.S. are said to speak English and Shelta, a form of Cant. The Cant spoken in the U.S. is similar to the Cant spoken in Ireland, but differs in some respects in that the language has transformed into a type of pidgin English over the generations. They typically do construction work, such as asphalting, spray-painting, and laying linoleum, or as itinerant workers.

== Religion ==
The vast majority of Travellers are practising Roman Catholics, and they pay particular attention to issues of faith healing. Many have been known to follow a strict code of behaviour that dictates some of their moral beliefs and influences their actions. Irish Travellers are known to practice their Catholic faith at holy wells and shrines across Ireland.

Travellers were excluded in the past from everyday parish activities in Ireland. Richard O'Brien of the Kerry diocese is a member of the Traveller community who started a groundbreaking initiative to reach out to the Irish Traveller community and help them to be more involved in parish life. In 2022, the Irish Bishops Conference released a statement to every parish, asking them to welcome Irish Travellers to their towns and villages throughout Ireland.

== Culture ==
Hedgehogs are, or at least used to be, eaten by Irish Travellers. Irish scones are also popular among Irish Travellers in the United States. A typical meal is coddle or spuds and cabbage with Irish soda bread.

=== Irish Traveller Ethnicity Day ===
Irish Traveller Ethnicity Day, or just Traveller Ethnicity Day, is an annual event on 1 March. It commemorates the Government of Ireland's recognition of Irish Travellers as a distinct ethnic minority on 1 March 2017.

On 1 March 2017, Taoiseach Enda Kenny announced that the Government of Ireland would be recognizing Irish Travellers as a distinct ethnic minority, with Kenny describing them as "a people within our people". Irish Traveller organisation Pavee Point considers the day to be a "powerful and historic moment for [the Traveller community]".

Several educational institutions have launched events relating to Irish Traveller Ethnicity Day, including the Atlantic Technological University, University of Galway (NUI Galway), and University College Dublin. NUI Galway's 2022 Traveller Ethnicity Day was opened by former President of Ireland Michael D. Higgins.

== Education ==
In 2004, it was reported that Traveller children often grow up outside educational systems. In 2017, Traveller children were reported to leave education at a younger age than children in the settled community, with 28% leaving the education system by age 13. One of the causes identified is the historical marginalisation of the community within the educational system. The segregation of Traveller children from their settled peers led to worse outcomes in regard to undertaking state examinations, and levels of numeracy and literacy.

The Irish Traveller Movement, a community advocacy group, promotes equal access to education for Traveller children. In the 2016 Ireland census, 167 Travellers received a third level educational qualification, a rise from 89 in 2011.

In December 2010, the Irish Equality Tribunal ruled in favour of a Traveller child in an anti-discrimination suit which covered the admission practices of CBS High School Clonmel in County Tipperary. In July 2011, the secondary school in Clonmel successfully appealed the decision of the Equality Tribunal that its admission criteria were indirectly discriminatory against children from the Traveller community.

The All Ireland Traveller Health Study found that 50% of Travellers reported issues with literacy.

== Notable people ==
For a more complete list, please see List of Irish Travellers

=== Theatre/film ===
The great-grandfather of actor Sir Sean Connery, James Connery, was discovered by ancestral research in 2005 to have been from the Irish Traveller community.

=== Sports ===
Irish Travellers have a long history of bare-knuckle boxing. Toughness and the ability to fight are viewed as particularly important among Traveller men, and their involvement in boxing has extended to traditional amateur and professional boxing. Irish Traveller Francie Barrett represented Ireland at the 1996 Olympics. Andy Lee fought for Ireland at the 2004 Olympics and later became the first Traveller to win a professional boxing world championship when he won the WBO middleweight title in 2014. Tyson Fury is an Englishman of Irish Traveller heritage and defeated long-reigning Wladimir Klitschko in 2015 to become the unified heavyweight world champion.

In the Traveller community, bare-knuckle boxing is seen as a way to resolve disputes and uphold family honour, as shown in the 2011 documentary Knuckle. This can lead to injuries, notably "fight bite" where, when punching an opponent, a tooth may cut the hand and bacteria in the opponent's mouth may infect the wound. Such infections can lead to permanent disability if left untreated.

Apart from boxing, Irish Travellers, including women, are involved in sports such as football (soccer) and Gaelic handball.

== Health ==
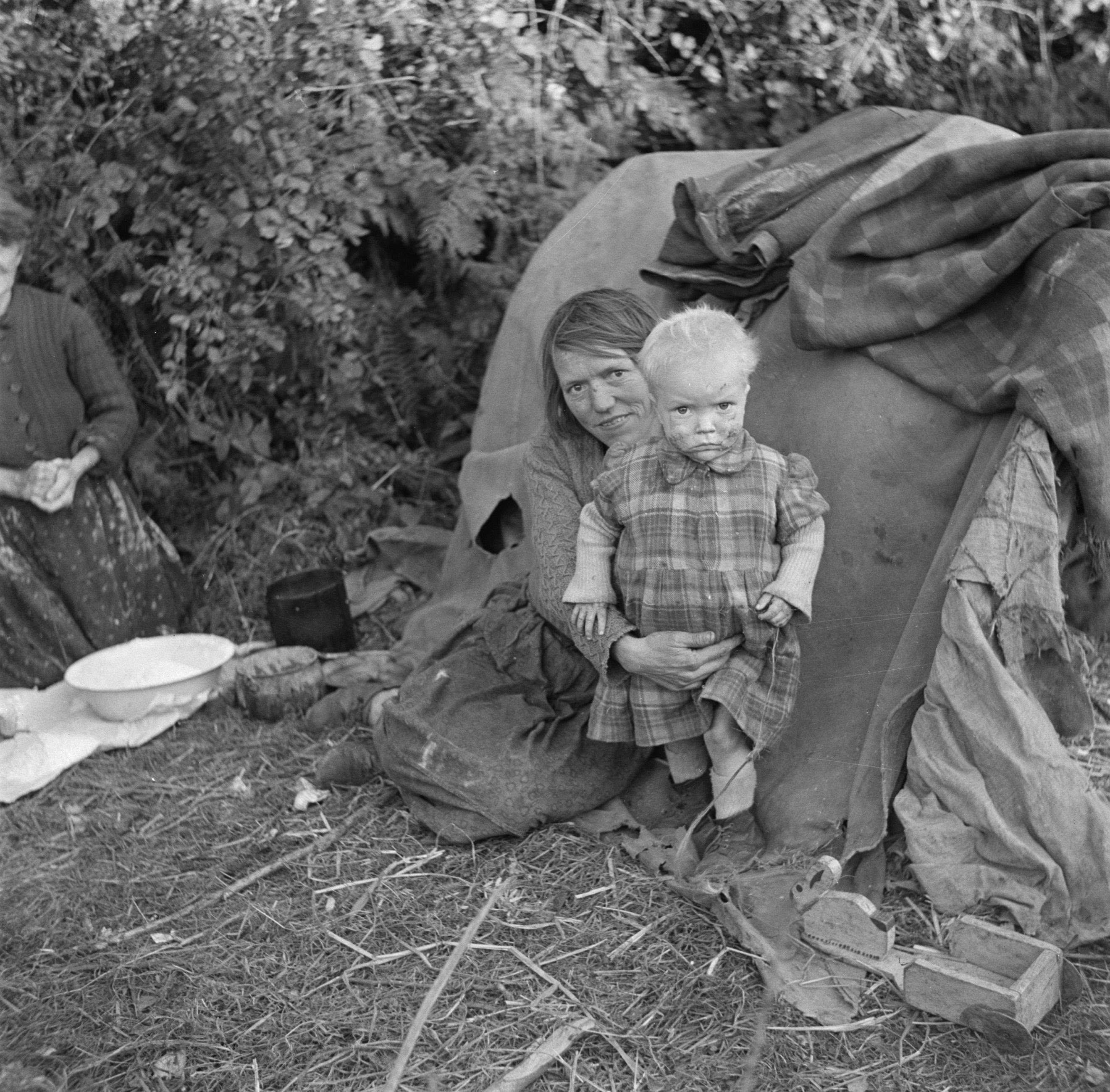
Irish Travellers in 1930

The health of Irish Travellers is significantly poorer than that of the general population in Ireland. A 2007 Irish report found that over half of Travellers do not live past the age of 39 years. The conclusion was based on data between January 1995 and December 2004. By comparison, the median life expectancy in Ireland in 2007 was 79.6 years. Another government report of 1987 found:

From birth to old age, they have high mortality rates, particularly from accidents, metabolic and congenital problems, but also from other major causes of death. Female Travellers have especially high mortality compared to settled women.

In 2007, the Department of Health and Children in the Republic of Ireland, in conjunction with the Department of Health, Social Services and Public Safety in Northern Ireland, commissioned the University College Dublin's School of Public Health and Population Science to conduct a major cross-border study of Travellers' welfare. The study, including a detailed census of Traveller population and an examination of their health status, was expected to take up to three years to complete. The main results of the study were published in 2010.

The birth rate of Irish Travellers has decreased since the 1980s, but they still have one of the highest birth rates in Europe. The birth rate for the Traveller community in 2008 was 24.4 per 1,000, higher than that of any European country; it was lower in Northern Ireland than in the Republic of Ireland.

Driving deaths are ten times more common in Traveller community compared to the general population. At 22%, this is the most common cause of death among Traveller men; for women, it is cancer. Traveller children have much higher mortality rates compared to the general population, with 10% of Traveller children dying by age two and only 1% of the general population. Almost 40% of young children's deaths are due to sudden infant death syndrome, and another 25% are due to genetic conditions. In Ireland, 2.6% of all deaths in the total population were for people aged under 25, versus 32% for Travellers. 80% of Travellers die before the age of 65.

In 2010, the National Traveller Suicide Awareness Project found that Traveller men are over six times more likely to die by suicide than the general population. In 2008, 11.2% of Traveller deaths that year were as a result of suicide.

== Marriage ==
Marriage among Travellers in their late teens is common. In the Census of Ireland 2016, 58.1% of Irish Travellers were under the age of 25, with 31.9% of this age group married. In 2016, 201 enumerated Irish Travellers aged 15 to 19 identified themselves as married, down from 250 in 2011.

Irish Travellers generally marry other Irish Travellers. Consanguineous marriage is common among Irish Travellers. (Note: A 1986 study reported that 39% of marriages in the study were between first cousins. According to Alison Healy in 2003, 19–40% of Irish Traveller marriages are between first cousins.) According to Judith Okely's work on Travellers in Britain in the 1970s, "there is no large time span between puberty and marriage", and the typical marriage age was 16–17 for females and 18–19 for males.

Irish Travellers lived as cohabiters who "married at one time without religious or civil ceremony." Into the early 20th century, about one-third of Irish Travellers were "married according to the law."

In 2008, according to Christopher Griffin, sociology and anthropology lecturer at Edith Cowan University, arranged Irish Traveller marriages in the early 21st century "safeguard the girl's [interests] by securing a man who won't mistreat her." In 2012, according to Julie Bindel, in Standpoint, some Irish Traveller females in the UK are forced into marriages, but Bindel points out that data is difficult to obtain because "the line between an arranged marriage and a forced one is not always clear."

== Social conflict ==
=== Discrimination and prejudice ===
Travellers are often reported as the subject of explicit political and cultural discrimination, with politicians being elected on promises to block Traveller housing in local communities and individuals frequently refusing service in pubs, shops and hotels. Settled populations often misinterpret Travellers' cultural differences, which results in their marginalization across different sectors of society.

A 2011 survey by the Economic and Social Research Institute of Ireland concluded that there is widespread ostracism of Travellers in Ireland. The report concluded that it could hurt the long-term prospects for Travellers, who "need the intercultural solidarity of their neighbours in the settled community. ... They are too small a minority, i.e., 0.5 per cent, to survive in a meaningful manner without ongoing and supportive personal contact with their fellow citizens in the settled community."

The general prejudice against Travellers hinders efforts by the central government to integrate Travellers into Irish society. Because Travellers are a minority group within Ireland and the United Kingdom, they have always faced discrimination on the basis of their ethnicity as Travellers. They experience discrimination in not having equal access to education, being denied service in pubs, shops, and hotels, and being subject to derogatory language.

The perception of Traveller women and men by the public varies greatly. Many of the development projects which aim to provide Travellers skills useful to settled life only offer courses to women and children. This differing perception of women has led them to be the primary point of contact between their communities and settled institutions, as Traveller men are seen as untrustworthy, due to the belief that their income derives from theft and the resale of stolen parts. This differs from the long-time perception of Traveller women as beggars, which historically has brought in a large percentage of household income. Women would frequently bring their children along with them while begging, as most of the public’s sympathy for Travellers has been directed toward their children.

Though women are largely perceived in a better light than men, they are still subject to the same assumptions and bigotry. This is demonstrated by the arrest of Nan Joyce, a Traveller woman who ran for political office. After her arrest for theft, her public perception as a Traveller overrode that of a woman and a mother, causing the public to turn on her messages for Travellers’ rights.

In 2016, the USA's Country Reports on Human Rights Practices for the United Kingdom stated that Irish Travellers reported receiving discrimination on "racial or ethnic grounds" in the UK, and stated that the High Court had ruled that the government had illegally discriminated against Travellers by unlawfully subjecting planning applications to special scrutiny.

In 2009, the European Parliament Committee of Enquiry on Racism and Xenophobia found them to be among the most discriminated-against ethnic groups in Ireland, and yet their status remains insecure in the absence of widespread legal endorsement. Anti-Traveller racism and discriminatory attitudes extend to those working in social services, including the Gardai, which presents additional issues to the Traveller community.

=== Work and income ===
In the 2016 Irish census, 4,524 of 9,055 Travellers over the age of 15 (50%) were "Unemployed having lost or given up previous job". While 10,653 Travellers were in the labour force, the vast majority, 8,541 (80.2%), were unemployed. Almost 1 in 8 Travellers (11.3%) stated that they were unable to work due to a disability, which was almost three times the rate of the general population (4.3%). A 2017 report from the Economic and Social Research Institute and Irish Human Rights and Equality Commission found that Irish Travellers are 10 times more likely to experience discrimination when seeking work in comparison to sedentary Irish.

Many Travellers are breeders of dogs such as lurchers and have a long-standing interest in horse trading. The main fairs associated with them are held annually at Ballinasloe (County Galway), Puck Fair (County Kerry), Ballabuidhe Horse Fair (County Cork), the twice-yearly Smithfield Horse Fair (Dublin inner city) and Appleby (England). They are often involved in dealing scrap metals. In 1993, 60% of the raw material for Irish steel was sourced from scrap metal, with approximately 50% (75,000 metric tonnes) sourced by the Traveller community, at a value of more than £1.5 million. Such percentages for more valuable non-ferrous metals may be significantly greater.

Since the majority of Irish Travellers' employment is either self-employment or wage labour, income and financial status varies greatly from family to family. Many families choose not to reveal the specifics of their finances, but when explained it is very difficult to detect any sort of pattern or regular trend of monthly or weekly income. To detect their financial status, many look to the state of their possessions: their trailer, motor vehicle, domestic utensils, and any other valuables.

=== Social identity ===
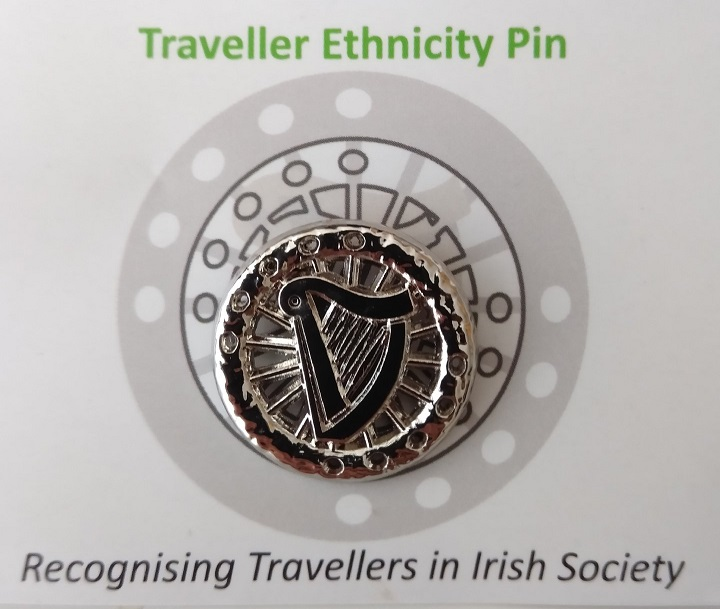
The Traveller Ethnicity pin was created to celebrate the Irish State's formal acknowledgment in March 2017 of Travellers as a distinct ethnic group in Irish society.

Irish Travellers are recognised in British and Irish law as an ethnic group. An ethnic group is defined as one whose members identify with each other, usually on the basis of a presumed common genealogy or ancestry. Ethnic identity is also marked by the recognition from others of a group's distinctiveness and by common cultural, linguistic, religious, behavioural or biological traits.

Contemporary Traveller culture reflects an evolution of traditional values and practices in interaction with legislative changes and wider societal changes. Nomadism, market trading, and horse ownership are traditional features of Traveller culture and heritage.

=== Violence and crime ===
In 1960, a government body was set up to conduct research into the Travelling Community in the Republic of Ireland. The Commission on Itinerancy operated under the auspices of the Department of Justice. The staff were appointed by the Junior Minister Charles Haughey. One finding was: that "public brawling fuelled by excessive drinking further added to settled people's fear of Travellers". Furthermore "feuding was felt to be the result of a dearth of pastimes and [of] illiteracy, historically comparable to features of rural Irish life before the Famine".

A 2011 report, conducted by the Irish Chaplaincy in Britain, Voices Unheard: A Study of Irish Travellers in Prison found that social, economic and educational exclusion were contributing factors to the "increasingly high levels of imprisonment" of Irish Travellers.

=== Travellers' sites in the United Kingdom ===
The passing of the Caravan Sites Act 1968 safeguarded Travellers' right to a site. In 1994, the Criminal Justice and Public Order Act 1994 repealed part II of the 1968 act, removing the duty on local authorities in the UK to provide sites for Travellers and giving them the power to close down existing sites. In Northern Ireland, opposition to Travellers' sites has been led by the Democratic Unionist Party.

Travellers make frequent use of other, non-authorised sites. These include public common land and private plots such as large fields and other privately owned lands. A famous example was the occupation of Dale Farm in Essex in 2010. The Travellers claim that there is an under-provision of authorised sites. The Gypsy Council estimates under-provision amounts to insufficient sites for 3,500 people.

== List of Travellers' organisations ==
The flag of the Irish Traveller Movement.

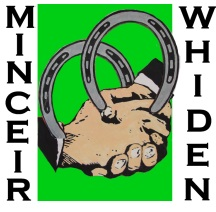
logo for Minceirs Whiden Ireland, the all-Traveller Forum

The following are some of the Travellers' representative organisations formed since the 1960s:

- Cork Traveller Visibility Group Ltd. (founded early 1990's)
- Exchange House Ireland (1980)
- Friends, Families and Travellers
- Irish Traveller Community (1960s)
- Irish Traveller Movement (founded in 1990)
- Itinerant Settlement Committee (1960s–1980s)
- Justice 4 All Women & Children (founded in 2015)
- Minceir Misli (1983–1985)
- Minceirs Whiden Ireland, the all-Traveller Forum (Minceirs Whiden is Cant for "Travellers talking")
- National Traveller Money Advice & Budgeting Service (2005)
- National Traveller Women's Forum
- The Traveller Movement
- Travellers' Rights Committee (1981–1983)
- Travellers' Education and Development Group (founded in 1984)
- Pavee Point (founded 1985)
- Bru Bhríde (founded early 1980s)

== Depictions and documentaries ==
Irish Travellers have been depicted, usually negatively but sometimes with some care and sympathy, in film, radio, print, and television.

- The Riches (2007–2008), the American television series featuring Eddie Izzard and Minnie Driver, take a deeper look into the Traveller lifestyle.
- The documentary series Big Fat Gypsy Weddings (2010, 2011, and 2012) has been commercially successful in the United Kingdom, offering glimpses of Traveller life as viewed at real-life weddings.
- A 1997 American film, Traveller, starring Bill Paxton and Mark Wahlberg, explored the Travellers in America.
- The 1993 documentary Rules of the Road German filmmaker Oliver Herbrich portrayed the Travellers in Ireland and the UK as a nomadic ethnic group forced to adapt to a settled lifestyle.
- Some of the main characters in the Irish sitcom Derry Girls encounter a group of Travellers in an episode that aired in March 2019.
- Brad Pitt played a bare-knuckle Traveller boxer in the movie Snatch.
- The 2005 Irish horror film Isolation has Traveller characters in its plot.
- Peaky Blinders features a number of Irish Traveller families including the Lee family, the Gray family, and the Shelby family. The most notable representation is Johnny Doggs, who in series 1, episode 2, is not with his own family but with the Lees. He later moves to the Shelbys.

== See also ==
- Environmental inequality in Europe
- Halting site
- King of the Travellers

Similar groups:

- Camminanti
- Mercheros
- Reisende/Skøyere
- Romani people
- Romanichal Travellers
- Scottish Travellers
- Travelling Showmen
- Voyageurs
- Welsh Kale
- Yenish Travellers

== General and cited references ==
- Bhreatnach, Aoife (2007). Becoming Conspicuous: Irish Travellers, Society and the State 1922–70. Dublin: University College Dublin Press. ISBN 978-1-904558-62-0.
- Bhreatnach, Ciara; Bhreatnach, Aoife, eds. (2006). Portraying Irish Travellers: histories and representations. Newcastle-upon-Tyne: Cambridge Scholars Press. ISBN 978-1-84718-055-1.
- Burke, Mary (2009). 'Tinkers': Synge and the Cultural History of the Irish Traveller. Oxford University Press, USA. ISBN 978-0-19-956646-4.
- Collins, Laura Angela (2019) The Tinker Menace; the diary of an Irish Traveller, independently published, ISBN 9781091090767
- Commission on Itinerancy (26 November 1963). Report (PDF). Official publications. Vol. Pr.7272. Dublin: Stationery Office. Archived (PDF) from the original on 4 September 2015.
- Dillon, Eamon (2006). The outsiders: exposing the secretive world of Ireland's Travellers. Merlin Publishing. ISBN 978-1-903582-67-1.
- Drummond, Anthony (2006). "Cultural denigration: media representation of Irish Travellers as criminal". In Hayes, Micheál; Acton, Thomas (eds.). Counter-Hegemony and the Postcolonial "Other". Cambridge Scholars Press: Cambridge. pp. 75–85. ISBN 978-1-84718-047-6.
- Drummond, Anthony (2007). "The construction of Irish Travellers (and gypsies) as a 'problem' ". In Ồ hAodha, Micheál (ed.). Migrants and Memory: The Forgotten "Postcolonials". Cambridge: Cambridge Scholars Press. pp. 2–42. ISBN 978-1-84718-344-6.
- Drummond, Anthony (2007). Irish Travellers and the Criminal Justice Systems Across the Island of Ireland (PhD thesis). University of Ulster.
- Gmelch, George (1985). The Irish Tinkers: the urbanization of an itinerant people. Prospect Heights, Illinois: Waveland Press. ISBN 978-0-88133-158-5.
- Gmelch, Sharon (1991). Nan: The Life of an Irish Travelling Woman. Prospect Heights, Illinois: Waveland Press. ISBN 978-0-88133-602-3.
- García Grande, María Remedios (2010). Ni una palabra más (in Spanish). Bilbao Biografías Personales. ISBN 978-84-614-1053-8.
- Joyce, Nan (1985). Farmar, Anna (ed.). Traveller: an autobiography. Dublin: Gill and Macmillan. ISBN 978-0-7171-1388-0.
- Maher, Sean (1998). The Road to God Knows Where: A Memoir of a Travelling Boyhood. Dublin: Veritas Publications. ISBN 978-1-85390-314-4.
- Merrigan, Michael (2009). "Is there a Case for Indigenous Ethnic Status in Ireland". In Stanley, Rory J. (ed.). Féil-scríbhinn Liam Mhic Alasdair: essays presented to Liam Mac Alasdair, FGSI. Dublin: Genealogical Society of Ireland. pp. 101–115. ISBN 978-1-898471-67-7.
- Ó hAodha, Micheál; Acton, Thomas A., eds. (2007). Travellers, Gypsies, Roma: The Demonisation of Difference. Newcastle-upon-Tyne: Cambridge Scholars Press. ISBN 978-1-84718-127-5.
- Relethford, John H.; Crawford, Michael H. (2013). "Genetic drift and the population history of the Irish travellers". American Journal of Physical Anthropology. 150 (2): 184–189. Bibcode:2013AJPA..150..184R. doi:10.1002/ajpa.22191. ISSN 0002-9483. PMID 23180293.
- Sánchez Rodríguez, Eleuterio (1977). Camina o revienta: memorias de "El Lute" (in Spanish). Madrid: Cuadernos para el diálogo. ISBN 978-84-229-6014-0.
- Thouroude, Guillaume (2012). Voyage au pays des Travellers: Irlande, début du XXIe siècle. Voyage au pays des ... (in French). Paris: Cartouche. ISBN 978-2-915842-84-5..
