= Gypsy, Roma and Traveller =

Umbrella term used for traditionally nomadic groups

In the United Kingdom, Gypsy, Roma and Traveller (abbreviated to GRT) is an umbrella term to represent certain ethnic groups with a history of nomadism.

In the phrase GRT, the Gypsy grouping encompasses Romani people from groups that have resided in Britain since the 16th century, such as the English Gypsies (Romanichal) and Welsh Gypsies (Kale). The British government and British GRT rights groups understand the term Roma as encompassing more recent Romani migrants from Continental Europe. Travellers include Irish Travellers (Mincéirí) residing in Britain and Northern Ireland and other non-Romani traditional travelling people such as Scottish Travellers. Although these groups' lifestyles traditionally involved travel, most GRT people now live in houses or permanent caravan berths.

The term GRT is used officially by the British Government and Travellers' Rights organisations, as well as by universities, academics and local authorities. GRT people are protected under the UK's equality legislation; however, they face frequent discrimination and racism in their dealings with state bodies and the non-GRT community.

GRT people, as a group, are at risk of social exclusion and suffer from disadvantages in education, housing and health.

== GRT groups in Britain ==
The groups referred to under the umbrella term "GRT" are diverse, but share certain common historical and social traits. The principal commonality is their history of nomadism; recent or still practiced in the case of Travellers and Gypsies (Romani), but more distant in the case of Roma migrants. Romani people in the UK share consciousness of themselves as a discrete ethnicity from the non-Romani population, known as Gorjas or country people in England, Scotland and Wales.

Despite their differences, there are cultural factors which unite Travellers with Roma and Gypsies. Family bonds and kinship networks are very important to Travellers, Roma and Gypsies, with a strong emphasis on rites of passage such as weddings, anniversaries, births and funerals that offer an opportunity to unite the family. These celebrations have a strong ritual and ceremonial component. All British GRT groups have a strong preference for early marriage and make tidiness and cleanliness a strong cultural value. There is also a tendency across all groups to prefer self-employment, while adapting their specific economic activity to the changing wider societal context.

Non-ethnic occupational or cultural traveller communities, such as Showmen and Bargees are sometimes excluded from the term GRT, despite sharing many aspects of the traditional lifestyle of GRT groups. They are sometimes included in a broader category of Gypsy, Roma, Traveller, Show People and Bargees (GRTSB).

All GRT groups in Britain suffer from racism and prejudice in their dealings with settled society, the media and the state.

=== Gypsies ===
The term Gypsies in GRT refers to Romani people belonging to groups that have existed in Britain for centuries, such as Romanichal (English Gypsies) and Kale (Welsh Gypsies). They share a common origin in Romani populations which emigrated from India during the first millennium and arrived in Britain in the early 16th century, meaning their presence predates the establishment of the United Kingdom by two centuries. Traditionally, the Romanichal and Kale spoke comprehensive variants of Romani until their dialects began to mix heavily with English and Welsh, respectively.

==== Use of "Gypsy" in the UK ====
The term Gypsy, which originates in the word "Egypt", mistakenly believed to be the original homeland of the Gypsies, has been controversial. Some Romani activists reject the term, but it is embraced by others. Although the term "Roma" was endorsed in place of "Gypsies" at the first World Roma Congress in London, many Romani people in Britain prefer to call themselves Gypsies, or names that include the term such as Romani Gypsies or Romany Gypsies. They also commonly refer to themselves as Romani or Romanies.

The British Government, academics and pro-GRT advocacy groups, the NHS and local authorities all use the term "Gypsies" to describe Romani populations that have been in the UK for centuries. The Traveller Movement, Friends, Families and Travellers and Equity's Gypsy, Roma and Traveller Network use "Gypsy" without qualification, whereas the Women and Equalities Select Committee of the British Parliament states in its report on the GRT community:

We asked many members of the Gypsy, Roma and Traveller communities how they preferred to describe themselves. While some find the term "Gypsy" to be offensive, many stakeholders and witnesses were proud to associate themselves with this term and so we have decided that it is right and proper to use it, where appropriate, throughout the report.

Eastern European Roma living in the UK and North America generally reject the English term "Gypsy" as they associate it with terms in the languages of their countries of origin which are considered racial slurs.

In November 2024, the Traveller Movement recommended that the British Government should change its official terminology from Gypsy, Roma and Traveller to Romani (Gypsy), Roma and Traveller in order to "better reflect the specific groups for whom the DfE collects statistical data, and more accurately represent the distinct protected characteristics of each community under the Equality Act 2010".

The term is sometimes incorrectly used to refer to Irish Travellers in Britain.

==== English and Welsh Gypsies ====
The Romani Gypsies of England and Wales (also known as Romanichal and Kale, respectively) first arrived in Britain in the 16th century. Their traditional language was Kale Romani, a form of which survived in Wales into the 20th century and retained much more grammatical complexity than the Angloromani dialect that had developed in England by that time. However, both Romani subgroups are now English-speaking, employing Angloromani or Welsh Romani as cultural languages.

Gypsies in England and Wales were traditionally nomadic, however the majority now live in houses or permanent camp sites.

Romanichal are also present in Scotland, where they are known locally as Border Gypsies. They are a subset of Romanichal who have settled in Scotland, or, if nomadic, spend at least part of their time there. They are speakers of northern English Angloromani and are sometimes members of Romani associations in England.

==== Scottish Border Travellers ====
Scottish border travellers are a subset of northern English Romany Gypsies who have settled in Scotland, or, if nomadic, who spend part of their time there. They are speakers of northern English Angloromani and sometimes have membership of English traveller associations. Their local name is "Border Gypsies".

=== Roma ===
The term Roma in GRT is understood to refer to Romani people who migrated more recently to Britain from mainland Europe, particularly Central and Eastern Europe. In the 2021 Census of England and Wales, 13.9% of people who identified as Roma were born in England while a percentage of those born in Wales was not provided. Meanwhile, 26.1% were born in Italy, 23.6% were born in Romania, 6.6% were born in Slovakia, 6.2% in Brazil, 3.1% in Moldova, 2.9% in Spain, 2.3% in the Czech Republic, 2.1% in Portugal and 2% in Poland. While Romani migrants from mainland Europe arrived in the UK in small numbers during the 19th and 20th centuries, the level of immigration increased following the fall of the Berlin Wall, especially with the gradual accession of Eastern European countries to the EU and EU freedom of movement. Most Roma migrants in Britain speak the national languages of their country of origin, with some speaking a dialect of Romani additionally. Romani people from different countries often have considerable cultural differences between them, and even in the same country they may have different sub-ethnic identities.

Romani people originated in India, arriving in Europe around the 12th century, after passing through the Byzantine Empire. Romani people have resided in Britain since at least 1515, where they have faced a history of prejudice and persecution. Those that remained in mainland Europe were victims of genocide during the Second World War. In post-communist countries, many were forcibly settled by communist authorities and were invariably the first workers to be sacked from state industries during the transition to capitalism. There has been a notable increase in anti-Roma sentiment in the post-communist era and they continue to suffer discrimination and social exclusion, with the economic and social positions of Roma becoming more marginal throughout Eastern Europe. These factors have spurred migration to the UK.

Roma migrants living in Britain do not practice nomadism.

=== Travellers ===
Travellers are non-Romani itinerant groups in Britain and Northern Ireland, including the indigenous Travelling groups of Britain and the Irish travellers of Ireland. These groups have an understanding of themselves as a separate population from mainstream society. Despite the name, a majority of ethnic travellers are actually house or fixed caravan dwellers.

==== Irish Travellers ====
Irish Travellers (also known as Pavees or Mincéirs) are a traditionally nomadic ethno-cultural group originating in Ireland. They speak English and De Gammon, also known as Shelta, a mixed language with its origins in Irish and English. They largely practice the Roman Catholic religion and have a preference for self-employment. Although there are similarities between their traditional lifestyles, Irish Travellers are not of Romani descent and have no genetic relationship to Romany Gypsies. The two groups only occasionally intermarry.

Irish Travellers have been officially recognised as an ethnic minority in Northern Ireland since 1997 and Ireland since 2017. However they still suffer from discrimination and social exclusion on both sides of the border.

==== Scottish Travellers ====
Scottish Gypsies/Travellers (or Nachins/Nawkins) are a traditionally nomadic ethnic group which emerged from intermarriage of the indigenous Scottish population with Romani nomads. In this respect they are similar to para-Romani groups such as the Spanish Quinquis and the Swedish Tattere. They are first recorded in the 19th century but probably originated earlier than this. Their traditional language is Scottish Cant. In the past the group were known as "tinkers", but in recent years that name has become pejorative.

The Scottish/Gypsy Traveller Association exists as an advocacy group for the community.

=== Non-ethnic Travellers ===
Non-ethnic Travellers are people who have a lifestyle which involves a peripatetic residence for part or all of the year. The term covers occupational travellers who travel for work, such as show people and bargees; and "lifestyle travellers", such as New Age travellers. These groups do not enjoy legal protection as ethnic minorities in the UK and are only rarely considered as members of the GRT community. Non-ethnic Travellers suffer similar social disadvantage to ethnic Traveller groups, but are often overlooked in policy-making, due to the absence of official monitoring categories applicable to them. For this reason, some scholars and organisations use the more inclusive term GRTSB (Gypsy, Roma, Traveller, Show People and Bargee).

== Demographics ==
It is difficult to arrive at an accurate number of GRT people in the United Kingdom due to problems with surveying methods, reluctance of GRT people to self-report as Gypsy, Roma or Traveller, and the essential ambiguity around how and when GRT individuals might choose to identify themselves as such.

In the 2011 census, 57,680 people identified themselves as members of categories which the government interpreted as belonging under the umbrella of GRT. However, the British government website notes that much higher estimates, from 150,000 to 500,000 people exist.

Brown, Scullion and Martin, writing in 2013, based on interviews with local authority officers, put the number of GRT people in the country at between 400,000 and 500,000. They estimated 200,000-300,000 of these to be Travellers and indigenous Gypsies, with a further 200,000 migrant Roma, principally from the EU.

Acton et al, writing in 2014, argued that definitive numbers for the GRT community were impossible to establish. They showed that Roma in Central and Eastern Europe significantly under reported their Roma ethnicity, and that this was likely to also be the case for Romani people migrating from these countries to the UK. They also stated that the presence of the term "gypsy" on the form was likely to reduce self-identification due to the negative connotations of similar terms in their home countries. In the 2021 Census of England and Wales, residents were also given the option to identify themselves as "Roma". Acton and colleagues further suggested that GRT identity was not binary, and that GRT people, like other groups, would not necessarily consistently identify as belonging to the group.

In view of these factors they gave estimates of 240,000 people who normally identify as GRT in the UK, 350,000 who sometimes identify as GRT and 750,000 who ever do so. They estimated the Traveller and indigenous Gypsy population at 240,000-250,000, with 60,000 of these living in caravans.

In 2022, the Traveller Movement reported that the 2021 census showed an increase in the number of GRT people in the country to 168,749. The association viewed this as largely a result of the inclusion of a "Roma" category in the survey, which 100,981 people selected. They also noted a 17.5% increase in the number of people identifying as Gypsies or Travellers, but stated that they believed this was still a significant under-counting across all GRT groups.

== Discrimination ==
Gypsies and Irish Travellers are recognised as ethnic groups and legally protected against discrimination in the Equality Act 2010. Although the term Roma is not explicitly named in the act, Roma are still protected against discrimination on the basis of ethnicity and Roma migrants are also protected on the basis of nationality. Despite this, discrimination against GRT communities is commonplace in the United Kingdom.

=== Anti-GRT attitudes and hate crime ===
Prejudice against Gypsy, Roma and Traveller people is common in the UK, and Gypsy, Roma and Traveller people report that they are victims of high levels of hate crime.

A 2018 Equality and Human Rights Commission report found that 44% of British people expressed openly negative opinions about GRT people, this was the highest level of prejudice against any British ethnic group by a margin of 22%. A 2022 YouGov poll found that 45% of people would be uncomfortable living next door to a Gypsy or Traveller, 38% would be uncomfortable with their child playing at GRT child's house, 33% would be uncomfortable with their child marrying a Gypsy or Traveller, and 34% would be uncomfortable with a Gypsy or Traveller visiting or working on their house. A survey of GRT people by Hertfordshire Gypsy and Traveller Exchange found that they described suffering hate speech and hate crimes on an almost daily basis. 81.6% of GRT respondents felt that hate crimes were "something which members of their community experience routinely and it is therefore 'simply something GRT folk have to put up with'". A 2023 report by the Centre on the Dynamics of Ethnicity showed that 62% of Gypsies and travellers had experienced racially motivated violence, the highest figure of all the groups surveyed.

Notwithstanding its prevalence, anti-GRT hate crime is under-reported in official statistics. This is in part due to reluctance on the part of GRT people to report it to the police, but failure to appropriately classify anti-GRT hate crimes within the legal system is also an issue. Many police forces do not record the ethnicity of victims according to 2021 census categories, making collection of statistics difficult. Pro-GRT advocacy group, Friends, Families and Travellers, highlights problems with the consistency and appropriateness of police and Crown Prosecution Service's efforts in identifying and prosecuting hate crime against GRT people. A specific example of discrimination in the Criminal Justice system given by the group was the 2003 killing of Johnny Delaney, an Irish Traveller boy who was kicked to death by non-Travellers. Despite witnesses describing the killers shouting racial slurs, and the police recording the incident as a hate crime, the judge ruled the incident not to be racially motivated, convicted the killers of manslaughter rather than murder, and sent them to prison for only 4.5 years.

=== Portrayals of GRT communities in the media ===
Negative portrayals of Gypsies, Roma and Travellers are common in the British press and on television and play a role in the creation of anti-GRT sentiment, and consequent discrimination, among the settled community. Racist discourse about Travellers, including incitement to violence and even explicit calls for genocide, frequently appear in user comments on the sites of British media organisations and social media. Research has shown an increase in hate crimes against GRT people immediately following the publication of articles and transmission of programmes which feature negative depictions of them.

In 2004, the Daily Express published a campaign against the immigration of Roma from Eastern Europe following the accession of several new member states to the European Union. The campaign used terms such as "flood" and "invasion" and claimed that 1.6 million "gipsies" were ready to migrate to Britain. Journalists from the paper reported that they were pressurised by senior staff to write "anti-Gypsy" articles and called for the Press Complaints Commission to take action to protect them from these demands. The campaign led to the Labour government changing the law to make it more difficult for migrants to claim benefits.

The Sun newspaper ran a series of anti-Gypsy/Traveller articles in the run up to the 2005 general election, in its Stamp on the Camps campaign. The campaign was supported by Conservative leader Michael Howard, who suggested that Travellers were "hiding behind human rights legislation". The Commission for Racial Equality found that this campaign was accompanied by an increase in hate crime against Gypsies and Travellers and numerous police complaints were made against The Sun on grounds of incitement to racial hatred. However, the Crown Prosecution Service ruled that no direct link could be proven between the outbreak of hate crime and the paper's campaign, so no legal proceedings were initiated. A complaint made to the Press Complaints Commission was rejected on the grounds that no specific individuals were mentioned in The Sun's articles, and so no breach of the PCC code had occurred.

In the period leading up to the Brexit referendum of 2016, and during the period in which the UK's withdrawal deal was being negotiated, the British press continually portrayed European Roma immigrants to the UK as potential benefit fraudsters and criminals. This negative stereotyping both emerged from and fed into existing negative perceptions of Gypsies and Travellers, and was intended to create support for Britain leaving the EU. Particularly notable in this process were series of anti-GRT articles which appeared in The Sun, the Daily Mail, and the Daily Express. Aidan McGarry, in his book Romaphobia, argues that these depictions not only increase anti-GRT racism, but create a cycle of marginalisation in which Romani people are forced into helplessness and impoverishment, confirming prejudices against them in the minds of settled people.

In April 2020, the Channel 4 series Dispatches broadcast an episode entitled The Truth about Traveller Crime. In the programme, Conservative MP Andrew Selous compared Travellers to the Taliban. The programme was described by Families, Friends and Travellers, a GRT advocacy group, as misleading and encouraging hatred against Travellers. Ofcom received over 7000 complaints about the programme, which it took 503 days to investigate, before finding no breaches of its code. In May 2020, Jeanette McCormick, the national police GRT lead, stated that there was no substance to the programme's central point that there is a link between higher crime and the presence of Traveller sites. In the month following the programme's broadcast, there was a spike in hate crimes towards Travellers, with the number of reports to Report Racism GRT almost trebling.

A 2020 study by Naomi Thompson and David Woodger analysed the articles and comments on Gypsies and Travellers in the local press. They identified a cycle of discourse beginning with a press report of a new camp or incident which frames the presence of Travelling people as a problem. This is followed by the voicing of negative stereotypes about Gypsies and Travellers in the comment section, which escalate into hate speech, including proposals of violence and even genocide. On-line hate speech is then transferred into concrete action in the real world, as various means of harassing the Travellers are discussed and put into practice. The authors also pointed out that newspaper moderators would censor swearwords in the racist posts, but allow racial slurs such as pikey to remain.

== Social exclusion ==
=== Education ===
GRT pupils underperform considerably in education, having on average the lowest attainment of any ethnic group at every stage of compulsory schooling. In 2018, 19% of Irish Travellers, and 16% of Gypsy and Roma students, achieved 4 GCSEs at grade C or above, compared to a national average of 64%. Gypsy Roma and Traveller groups also have the highest exclusion rates and lowest attendance of any ethnic group. However, this data may exaggerate under-achievement, as students in need of extra support at school are more likely to have their ethnicity recorded than those who are not.

Underachievement continues into Higher Education, where only 660 GRT students were registered as attending university in 2020/2021.

==== Barriers to achievement in British schools ====
GRT children face various barriers to educational achievement in British schools. It is common for school and local authority bureaucracies to lack the flexibility to accommodate pupils with itinerant lifestyles, leading to a high level of absenteeism. This is compounded by the problem of frequent evictions, which may force students to leave or miss school. The mediation of Traveller Education Support Services can also be a negative factor, as it can prevent direct contact between GRT parents and schools.

Roma children and parents may have had negative experiences of education due to discrimination in other countries' systems, and lack the cultural knowledge and linguistic skills to negotiate the British system. For example, 45% of GRT children claim free school meals, although research indicates the percentage entitled to them is much higher. Some GRT children also face linguistic barriers to achievement, given the range of languages and dialects spoken in their communities.

Prejudice against GRT people is widespread in Britain, and so discrimination is also a barrier to achievement for GRT pupils. GRT pupils may face opposition to them attending schools from non-GRT parents. Schools sometimes avoid accepting GRT children as they lack the funding to deal with students who have English as an Additional Language or special educational needs. Bullying of GRT children occurs, which parents link to negative stereotypes propagated by the media, leading to negative feelings towards school among some GRT children. A 2003 study showed that 80% of GRT pupils in British schools stated they had been bullied or called names. These factors can contribute to difficulties in forming friendships with classmates from the settled community. In universities, little effort is made to cater for GRT pupils, with a study of 100 universities showing less than 30% of universities even mentioning GRT students in their Access and Participation Plans.

Cultural barriers to educational achievement also exist within the GRT community. Parents may prefer their children to take up traditional employment, for which formal schooling may be of marginal use. However, these attitudes appear to be changing, with more GRT parents recognising the value of higher education and IT skills.

=== Health ===
GRT communities have the poorest health outcomes of any ethnic group in the United Kingdom. For Gypsies and Travellers in the UK, life expectancy is approximately 11 years shorter than the national average. Although no data currently exists for British Roma, it is likely that health inequalities both in the UK and their countries of origin will negatively affect life expectancy. Long term sickness and disability is a significant barrier to employment for many Gypsies and Travellers, with a 2022 study by Friends, Families and Travellers showing significantly higher levels of long-term sickness, health problems and disabilities which limit daily activities than in the general population. Gypsies and Travellers have much higher rates of bronchitis, asthma and angina than the general population, as well as more problems with mobility, self-care, pain, anxiety and depression. GRT people also suffer from disproportionately high levels of suicide which may be linked to untreated depression. Studies demonstrate that in the UK negative maternal and new-born health outcomes such as miscarriages, low birth-weight and infant mortality are more common among GRT people than the general population, and that this is also true across Europe.

The reasons GRT people are prone to worse health outcomes include poorer living conditions, vulnerability to homelessness, low educational achievement, social exclusion, prejudice and discrimination and barriers to accessing healthcare.
