= Jean-Pierre Liégeois =

- Born: France
- Occupation: Academic Professor
- Known for: Sociology, Romani Population Studies

Jean-Pierre Liégeois (born 1947) is a French sociologist and honorary professor at Paris-Descartes University.

It was at this university, in 1979, that he founded the Gypsy Research Center in the university's social sciences department, of which he remained president until 2003. Today, he works as an expert for the Council of Europe and has been collaborating with the European Commission on Roma issues since the early 80s. He is also a member of the Groupe d'étude pour l'Europe de la culture et de la solidarité (GEPECS).

His sociological research focuses on Roma populations, minorities and politics, in particular minorities and international institutions, European policies, and migration contexts.
