= The Traveller Movement =

British charity for the Gypsy, Roma, and Traveller community

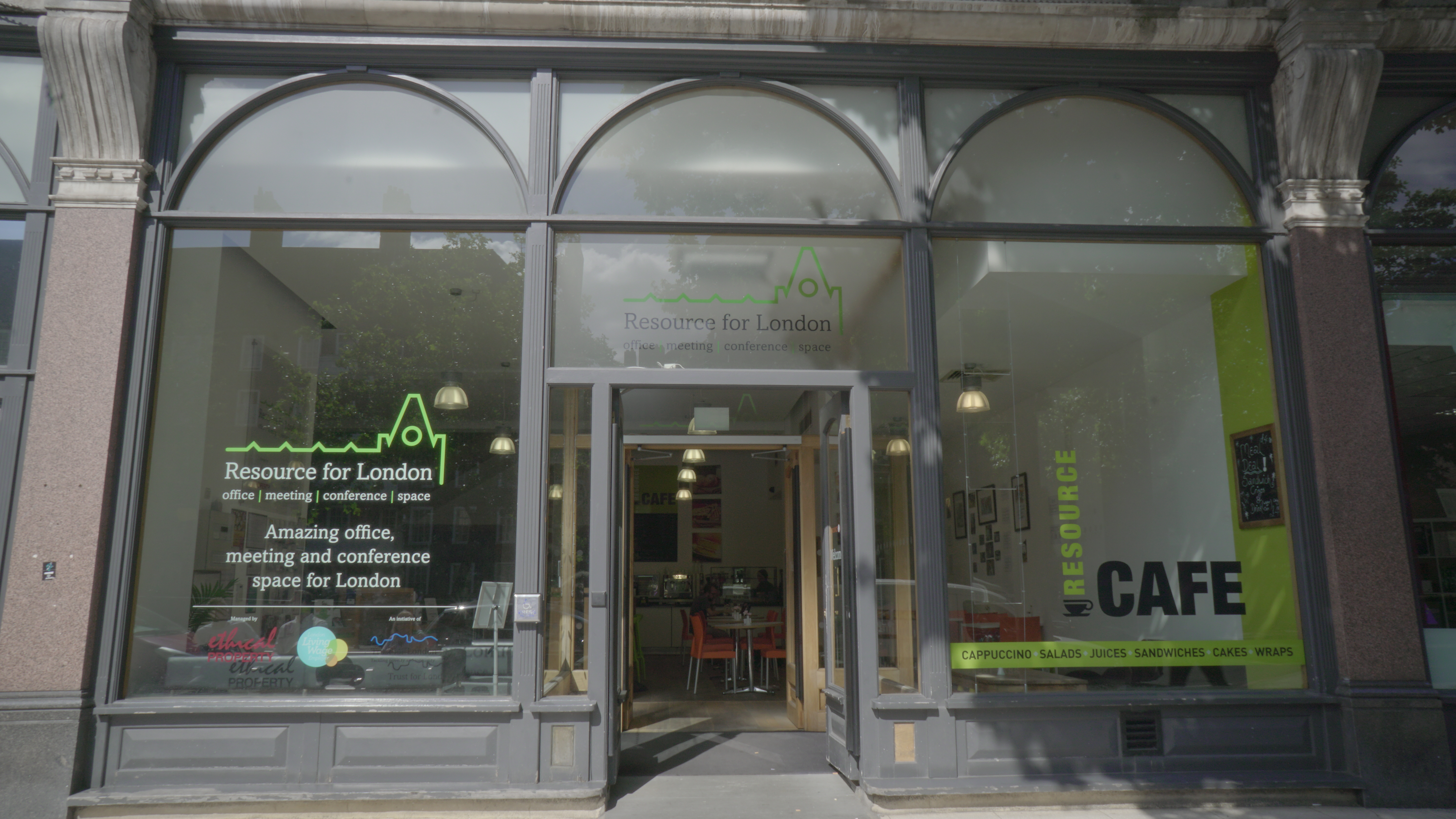
- Founded: 1999; 27 years ago
- Type: Charity
- Registration no.: 1107113
- Purpose: Gypsy, Roma and Traveller rights
- Location: London, England
- Coordinates: 51°55′57.65″N 0°11′58.61″W
- Region served: England and Wales
- Key people: Yvonne MacNamara
- Website: travellermovement.org.uk

The Traveller Movement (TM) is a charity based in the United Kingdom that supports the Gypsy, Roma and Traveller (GRT) community and challenge discrimination against GRT people.

== History ==
TM was founded in 1999 as a community organisation to combat the "gap in service provision and the marginalisation of the Irish Traveller community in Britain".

The charity is currently led by Yvonne MacNamara who was appointed CEO in 2008.

The TM and other claimants took JD Wetherspoon PLC to court following an incident in 2011 in which members of the Irish Traveller and Romany Gypsy community were refused entry to a Wetherspoons pub. After legal proceedings lasting over three years, Wetherspoons was judged to have discriminated against the claimants on racial grounds and were required to pay compensation. The Community Law Partnership, in its summary of the legal case, stated that:

This is an extremely important Judgment on the question of race discrimination as it applies to Irish Travellers and Romani Gypsies especially in confirming that an organisation can take a claim and that non-Gypsies and Travellers who are discriminated against because of "association" with Gypsies and Travellers can also take a claim.

The charity also campaigns to encourage GRT people to vote in elections, to record the number of GRT people involved in public institutions such as the NHS and justice system, and against hate crimes against GRT people. The TM aims to improve reporting of hate crimes against GRT people, and has received significant media coverage for drawing attention to incidents of race hatred against GRT people.

In one such hate crime incident, Reading University was forced to apologise after students organised a 'pikey night' which the TM criticised as being discriminatory and offensive to GRT people. TM CEO Yvonne MacNamara stated that "The term 'pikey' is widely recognised as a derogatory term for Gypsies and Travellers, and there is no place for it in an institution that should provide a safe and nurturing environment for all students, regardless of their race or ethnicity".

The TM challenged Ofcom and Channel 4 over its advertising of the programme My Big Fat Gypsy Wedding. According to The Guardian, "The charity had claimed that the Channel 4 broadcasts of Big Fat Gypsy Weddings and Thelma's Gypsy Girls had depicted children in a sexualised way and portrayed men and boys as feckless, violent and criminal." Ultimately the complaint was rejected by the High Court.

In 2017, the TM successfully persuaded the UK Ministry of Justice to introduce ethnic monitoring of GRT people in the youth justice system.

In 2022, the TM campaigned against the proposed Police, Crime, Sentencing and Courts Bill, and has called on the streaming service Netflix to remove anti-Roma jokes made by Jimmy Carr.

== See also ==
- Friends, Families and Travellers
