= Camminanti =

Nomadic ethnic group in Italy

The Camminanti (Caminanti in Sicilian) are a nomadic ethnic group living in Sicily. They are closely associated with the Romani people, given their similar circumstances and lifestyles, and although they are not ethnic Romani, they are legally considered to be so by the European Union.

The European Union has repeatedly called for the human rights of Camminanti to be respected, as well as Italian Romani.

== Distribution ==
The Camminanti live mainly in Sicily (especially Val di Noto), however, there are smaller populations in Campania, Lombardy, and Lazio. They are a very small group, numbering about 2000.

== History ==
While it is agreed they came to Sicily during the 14th century, the exact origins of the Camminanti are unclear. One theory asserts that they are the descendants of Slavic and Nordic travellers, but this has been met with little consensus. Similar, but unproven, theories hypothesize that the people originated as the survivors of the 1693 Sicily earthquake or that they were initially slaves but transformed into an ethnic group after slavery was abolished. There is still little evidence in support of these claims.

== Culture ==
The Camminanti have their own language, called Baccagghiu, related to the Sicilian language and influenced by 16th century-era Greek travellers in Palermo.

In Italy they are well known for their practice of making balloons, which serves as one of their main sources of income.

Gradually more and more Camminanti are switching to a more sedentary way of life; however most of them are still itinerant.

== See also ==
- Demographics of Italy
- Itinerant groups in Europe
