= History of the Romani people =

The Romani people, also referred to as the Romani or Romanis, are an Indo-Aryan ethnic group who principally live in Europe.

The origins of the Romanis can be traced back to South Asia. They may have migrated north from present-day Rajasthan and Sindh to present-day Punjab around 250 BC. Their subsequent northwestward migration began in the 5th century. They are thought to have settled in Persia from the 6th century and Armenia from the 8th century. They arrived in Anatolia and Thrace during the Byzantine era, before migrating throughout the Balkans during the Ottoman expansion. The first appearance of Romanis in western Europe is linked to their journey from the Balkans in the 15th and 16th centuries, often as pilgrims travelling in organised groups of between 40 and 200 people. By the 16th century, they were present throughout western and northern Europe.

The traditional Romani language reflects the migratory history of its speakers, consisting of Indo-Aryan roots and significant input from Persian, Armenian, Greek and South Slavic. Influences from minority languages also demonstrate their history of living on the margins of society. Despite this, many Romanis today do not speak the language, largely due to their exposure to a history of forced assimilation efforts. Romani culture has been influenced by their time spent under various reigns and empires, notably the Byzantine and Ottoman empires.

Throughout their history, Romanis have made notable contributions to European society, particularly in fields such as craftsmanship, music, dance, politics, trade, agriculture, and veterinary medicine. Early records from the Balkans describe them as skilled labourers and craftsmen.

== Origin ==
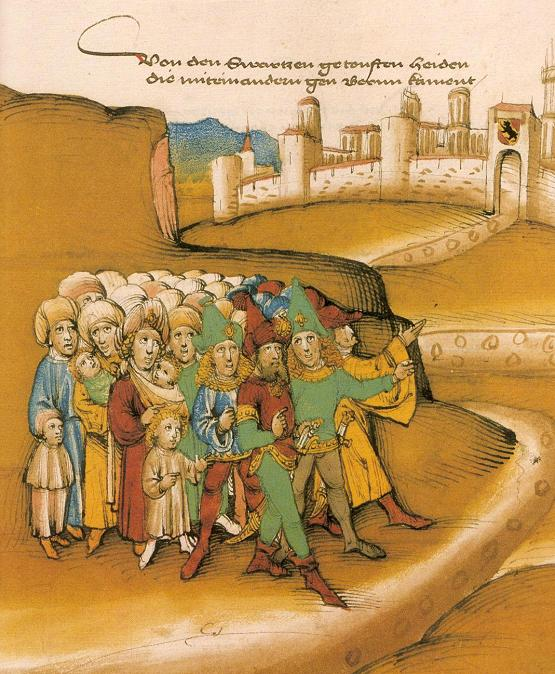
The initial arrival of Romani outside Bern in the 15th century, described by the chronicler as getoufte heiden "baptized heathens" and drawn wearing Saracene-style clothes and weapons (Spiezer Schilling, p. 749).

The origins of the Romani people lie in South Asia, though the exact location is not known. Linguistic evidence suggests migration from modern-day northern–central India, or less probably northwestern regions of India and eastern Pakistan. They may have formed part of the caste groups known as Doma, meaning "drummers".

The Romanis have been described by the historian Diana Muir Appelbaum as unique among peoples, because they have never identified themselves with a territory. They have no tradition of an ancient and distant homeland from which their ancestors migrated, nor do they claim the right to national sovereignty in any of the lands where they reside. Rather, Romani identity is bound up with the ideal of freedom expressed, in part, in having no ties to a homeland. The absence of a written history has meant that the origin and early history of the Romani people was long an enigma. Indian origin was suggested on linguistic grounds as early as the late 18th century.

In the Romani language, "rom" means husband/man, while "romňi" means wife/woman, and thus "roma" means "husbands/people". Some theories suggest that the ancestors of the Romani were part of the military in the north of what is now India. One modern theory states that during the invasions of Mahmud of Ghazni, defeated soldiers were moved west with their families into the Byzantine Empire, between AD 1000 and 1030. This theory was also espoused by linguist Marcel Courthiade, who argued that the chronicle Tarikh Yamini hints at the exodus of the Romani people. This chronicle of Mahmud of Ghazni's reign discusses his raid on Kannauj in 1026 AD. The text states that "the entire population, rich and poor, light and dark ... most of them 'eminent persons', artists and craftsmen ... entire families" of approximately 53,000 prisoners, were subsequently transported to Ghazni's homeland, in present-day Afghanistan, together with 385 elephants and 16 large chariots filled with jewelry. These people, Courthiade argues, were the ancestors of the modern Roma.

However, the Ghaznavid theory is controversial. Linguistic evidence shows that Romani speakers were in contact with Armenian-speakers by the 9th century and Byzantine Greek by the 10th, suggesting their migration from India occurred during the second half of the first millennium, predating the Ghaznavid invasion.

The author Ralph Lilley Turner has theorised the Romani origin as being in present-day central India, followed by a migration to the northwest, as the Romani language shares a number of ancient isoglosses with Central Indo-Aryan languages in relation to realization of some sounds of Old Indo-Aryan. This is lent further credence by its sharing exactly the same pattern of northwestern languages such as Kashmiri and Shina, through the adoption of oblique enclitic pronouns as person markers. The overall morphology suggests that the Romanis participated in some of the significant developments leading toward the emergence of new Indo-Aryan languages, thus indicating that the proto-Roma did not leave the Indian subcontinent until late in the second half of the first millennium.

=== Linguistic origins ===
Until the mid-to-late 18th century, theories about the origin of the Romanis were mostly speculative. In 1782, Johann Christian Christoph Rüdiger published his research findings, in which he pointed out the relationship between the Romani language and Hindustani. Subsequent work supported the hypothesis that Romani shared a common origin with certain Indo-Aryan languages in the north of the Indian subcontinent.

Evidence shows that the Romani language is part of the Central Aryan branch of the Indo-Aryan language family (like Hindi/Urdu), but that it also contains innovations found only in the Northwestern branch (containing Punjabi and Sindhi). The Palgrave Handbook of Romani Linguistics argues that this may demonstrate an origin in an area between the two dialect zones, which was largely conservative but affected to some degree by the changes occurring in the northwest. However, it does not discount the possibility that there was an initial migration from the central region by the proto-Roma, before a period of residence in the northwest.

The language also reflects the migratory history of the Romanis' ancestors. While it has Indo-Aryan roots, it also includes significant input from Persian, Armenian, and Byzantine Greek. Influences from minority languages also reflects the Romanis' history of living on the margins of society.

==== Domari and Romani languages ====
Domari was once thought to be the "sister language" of Romani, and that the two languages had split after the Romanies departed from the subcontinent, but based on more recent research findings, they should be considered two separate languages within the Central zone (Hindustani) Saraiki language group, as the differences between them are significant. Therefore, the Dom and the Roma are probably descendants of two different groups of people who migrated from the Indian subcontinent in two different waves, several centuries apart.

=== Genetic evidence ===
Further evidence for the South Asian origin of the Romanis came in the late 1990s. Researchers doing DNA analysis discovered that Romani populations carried large frequencies of particular Y chromosomes (inherited paternally) and mitochondrial DNA (mtDNA) (inherited maternally) that otherwise exist only in populations from South Asia.

47.3% of Romani men carry Y chromosomes of haplogroup H-M82, which is rare outside South Asia. Mitochondrial haplogroup M, most common in Indian subjects and rare outside southern Asia, accounts for nearly 30% of Romani people. A more detailed study of Polish Roma shows this to be of the M5 lineage, which is specific to India. Moreover, a form of the inherited disorder congenital myasthenia is found in Romani subjects. Caused by the 1267delG mutation, it is otherwise known only in subjects of Indian ancestry. This is considered to be the best evidence of the Indian ancestry of the Romanis.

The Romanis have been described as "a conglomerate of genetically isolated founder populations". The number of common genetic disorders found among Romanies from all over Europe indicates "a common origin and founder effect".

A study from 2001 by Gresham et al. suggests "a limited number of related founders, compatible with a small group of migrants splitting from a distinct caste or tribal group". The study also points out that "genetic drift and different levels and sources of admixture, appear to have played a role in the subsequent differentiation of populations". The same study found that "a single lineage ... found across Romani populations, accounts for almost one-third of Romani males".

A 2004 study by Morar et al. concluded that the Romanies are descended from "a founder population of common origins that has subsequently split into multiple socially divergent and geographically dispersed Romani groups". The same study revealed that this population "was founded approximately 32–40 generations ago, with secondary and tertiary founder events occurring approximately 16–25 generations ago".

There is genetic evidence of major mixing with Balkan peoples during the time of the Ottoman Empire.

==== Connection to the Burushos and Pamiris ====
The Burushos of Hunza have a paternal-lineage genetic marker that is grouped with Pamiri speakers from Afghanistan and Tajikistan as well as the Sinti ethnic group. This find of shared genetic haplogroups may indicate an origin of the Romani people in or around those regions.

==== Possible connection to the Domba people ====
According to a genetic study on the phylogeography of Y-chromosome haplogroup H1a1a-M82 in 2012, the ancestors of present Scheduled Castes and Scheduled Tribes of northern India, traditionally referred to collectively as the Ḍoma, are the likely ancestral populations of modern European Roma.

Romani origins based on autosomal and mitochondrial data

Mitochondrial or Y-chromosome haplotype studies provide valuable information, but a limitation of these types of studies is that they each represent only one instantiation of the genealogical process. Autosomal data permits simultaneous analysis of multiple lineages, which can provide novel information about population history. According to a genetic study on autosomal data, the two populations showing closest relatedness to Roma were Punjabis and Kashmiris, who also happen to have the highest West Eurasian-related ancestry among South Asians. However, according to a study on genome-wide data published in 2019, the putative origin of the proto-Roma involves a Punjabi group with low levels of West Eurasian ancestry. The classical and mtDNA genetic markers suggested the closest affinity of the Roma with Rajput and Punjabi populations from northwestern India.

== Early records ==
Early records of itinerant populations from Hind (a Persian term roughly referring to present-day Punjab, Rajasthan, and Sindh) begin as early as the Sasanian period. British linguist Donald Kenrick notes the first recorded presence of Zott in Baghdad in AD 820, Khanaqin in AD 834.

Contemporary scholars have suggested one of the first written references to the Romanis, under the term Atsingani, (derived from the Greek ἀτσίγγανοι – atsinganoi), dates from the Byzantine era during a time of famine in the 9th century. In the year AD 800, Saint Athanasia gave food to "foreigners called the Atsingani" near Thrace. Later, in AD 803, Theophanes the Confessor wrote that Emperor Nikephoros I had the help of the Atsingani to put down a riot with their "knowledge of magic". However, the Atsingani were a Manichean sect that disappeared from chronicles in the 11th century. The name Atsinganoi was used to refer to itinerant fortune tellers, ventriloquists, and wizards who visited emperor Constantine IX in the year 1054.

Skeletal remains exhumed from Castle Mall in Norwich, England, have been radiocarbon-dated by liquid scintillation spectrometry to c. 930–1050AD and identified as matching a modern Romani haplotype. This is possibly due to liaisons between the Norsemen and Roma in Byzantium.

== Europe ==
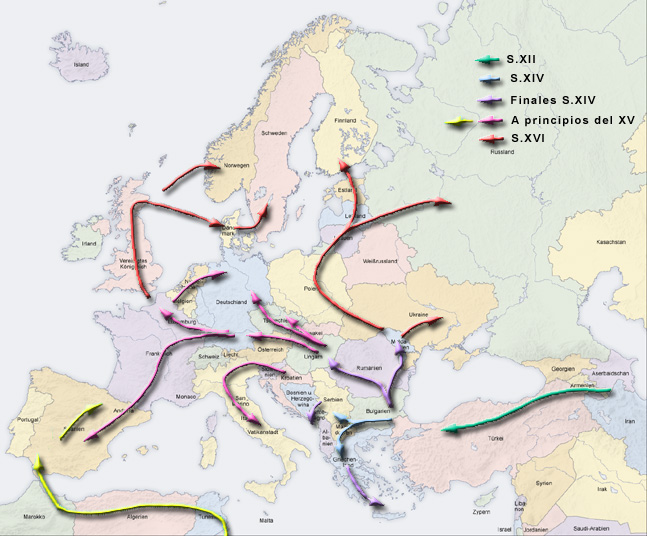
The migration of the Romani people into Europe. The key shows the century of arrival in that area, e.g., S.XII is the 12th century.

Romani people likely began arriving in the southern Balkans from around the mid-9th century, migrating from Anatolia and Armenia.

Early records from the Balkans describe Romanis as skilled labourers and craftsmen. They have made notable contributions to European society throughout their history in the continent, particularly in fields such as craftsmanship, music, dance, politics, trade, agriculture, and veterinary medicine.

It is believed that the Romanis "crystallised into a cohesive people" during the Byzantine period.

In 1323, Simon Simeonis, an Irish Franciscan friar, described people in likeness to the "atsingani" living in Crete: "We also saw outside this city [Candia] a tribe of people, who worship according to the Greek rite, and assert themselves to be of the race of Cain. These people rarely or never stop in one place for more than thirty days, but always, as if cursed by God, are nomad and outcast. After the thirtieth day they wander from field to field with small, oblong, black, and low tents, like those of the Arabs, and from cave to cave, because the place inhabited by them becomes after the term of thirty days so full of vermin and other filth that it is impossible to live in their neighbourhood."

In 1350, Ludolf von Sudheim mentioned a similar people with a unique language, whom he called Mandapolos, a word that some theorize was possibly derived from the Greek word Mantipolos – Μαντιπόλος "frenzied" from mantis – μάντις (meaning "prophet, fortune teller") and poleo – πολέω.

Around 1360, a fiefdom (called the Feudum Acinganorum) was established in Corfu. It mainly used Romani serfs, and the Romanis on the island were subservient.

By the 14th century, the Romanis had reached the Balkans and Bohemia; by the 15th century, Germany, France, Italy, Spain, and Portugal; and by the 16th century, Russia, Denmark, Scotland, and Sweden (although DNA evidence from mid 11th-century skeletons in Norwich suggest that at least a few individuals may have arrived earlier, perhaps due to Viking enslavement of Romani from the eastern Mediterranean, or liaisons with the Varangians). The arrival of Romanis in Western Europe is linked to their journey from the Balkans in the 15th and 16th centuries, often as pilgrims travelling in organised groups of between 40 and 200 people.

According to historian Norman Davies, a 1378 law passed by the governor of Nauplion in the Greek Peloponnese, confirming privileges for the "atsingani", is "the first documented record of Romany Gypsies in Europe". Similar documents, again representing the Romanis as a group that had been exiled from Egypt, record them reaching Brașov, Transylvania, in 1416; Hamburg, Holy Roman Empire, in 1418; and Paris in 1427. A chronicler for a Parisian journal described them as dressed in a manner that the Parisians considered shabby and reported that the Church had them leave town because they practiced palm-reading and fortune-telling.

Their early history shows a mixed reception. Although 1385 marks the first recorded transaction for a Romani slave in Wallachia, they were issued safe conduct by Sigismund of the Holy Roman Empire in 1417. Romanis were ordered expelled from the Meissen region of Germany in 1416, Lucerne in 1471, Milan in 1493, France in 1504, Aragon in 1512, Sweden in 1525, England in 1530 (see Egyptians Act 1530), and Denmark in 1536. In 1510, any Romanis found in Switzerland was ordered to be executed, and in 1554, a statute was passed in England that mandated all Romanis in the country leave or face execution. Similar legislation was passed in numerous European nations, including Denmark in 1589, Sweden in 1637, whereas Portugal began deportations of Romanis to its colonies in 1538.

Later, a 1596 English statute, however, gave Romanis special privileges that other wanderers lacked; France passed a similar law in 1683. Catherine the Great of Russia declared the Romanis "crown slaves" (a status superior to serfs) but also kept them out of certain parts of the capital. In 1595, Ștefan Răzvan overcame his birth into slavery and became the Voivode (Prince) of Moldavia.

In Wallachia, Transylvania, and Moldavia, Romani were enslaved for five centuries, until abolition in the mid-19th century.

In the late 19th century, the Romani culture inspired in their neighbors a wealth of artistic works. Among the most notable works are Carmen and La Vie de Bohème.

It is widely recognized that the Romani population in Byzantium from the twelfth to the fourteenth centuries engaged in various occupations, including laborers, artisans, craftsmen, metal workers, and artists.

=== Ottoman Empire ===
In the Ottoman Empire, Muslim Romani people (known as Xoraxane) were preferred, in contrast to Christian Roma (known as Dasikane). Muslim Roma were settled in Rumelia (Balkans) from Anatolia, such as the Arlije, or Cyprus, like the Gurbeti. There were also conversions to Islam in order to achieve better living conditions under Ottoman rule. The Sanjak of the Çingene was established for Muslim Roma in Rumelia, lasting from 1520 until the end of the Ottoman Empire. Muslim Roma were able to migrate from one part of the country to another within the Ottoman Empire. The Zargari tribe migrated to the Persian Empire.

=== Forced assimilation ===
In 1758, Maria Theresa of Austria began a program of assimilation to turn Romanis into ujmagyar (new Hungarians). The government built permanent huts to replace mobile tents, forbade travel, and forcefully removed children from their parents to be fostered by non-Romani. By 1894, the majority of Romanis counted in a Hungarian national census were sedentary. In 1830, Romani children in Nordhausen were taken from their families to be fostered by Germans.

Russia also encouraged settlement of all nomads in 1783, and the Polish introduced a settlement law in 1791. Bulgaria and Serbia banned nomadism in the 1880s.

In 1783, racial legislation against Romanis was repealed in the United Kingdom, and the Turnpike Roads Act 1822 (3 Geo. 4. c. 126) prevented nomads from camping on the roadside. This was strengthened in the Highway Act 1835 (5 & 6 Will. 4. c. 50).

=== Persecution ===
In 1530, England issued the Egyptians Act, which banned Romanis from entering the country and required those living in the country to leave within 16 days. Failure to do so could result in the confiscation of property, imprisonment, and deportation. The act was amended with the Egyptians Act 1554, which ordered the Romanis to leave the country within a month. Non-complying Romanis were executed.

In 1538, the first anti-ziganist (anti-Romani) legislation was issued in Moravia and Bohemia, which were under Habsburg rule. Three years later, after a series of fires in Prague that were blamed on the Romanis, Ferdinand I ordered them to be expelled. In 1545, the Diet of Augsburg declared that "whoever kills a Gypsy will be guilty of no murder". The massive killing spree that resulted prompted the government to eventually step in and "forbid the drowning of Romani women and children".

In 1660, Romanis were prohibited from residence in France by Louis XIV.

In 1685, Portugal deported Romani people to Brazil.

In 1710, emperor Joseph I issued a decree declaring the extermination of Romani, ordering that "all adult males were to be hanged without trial, whereas women and young males were to be flogged and banished forever". In addition, they were to have their right ears cut off in the kingdom of Bohemia and their left ear in Moravia. In 1721, Charles VI, Joseph's brother and successor, amended the decree to include the execution of adult female Romanis, while children were "to be put in hospitals for education".

From the 1920s, Romanis in the New Forest region of southern England were forced into a series of compounds. These were later replaced with a "Gypsy Rehabilitation Centre" at Thorney Hill, created for the purpose of forced assimilation, which remained active until the mid-1970s. In 2024, Romani archaeologist John-Henry Phillips excavated the site of the centre, which was featured on series 12 of BBC Two's Digging for Britain.

=== Pre-war organization ===
In 1879, a national meeting of Romanis was held in the Hungarian town of Kisfalu (now Pordašinci, Slovenia). Romanis in Bulgaria held a conference in 1919, in an attempt to demand that they be given the right to vote, and a Romani journal, Istiqbal ("future"), was founded in 1923.

In the Soviet Union, the All-Russian Union of Gypsies was organized in 1925 and a journal, Romani Zorya ("Romani dawn"), was published two years later. The Romengiro Lav ("Romani word") writer's circle encouraged works by authors like Nikolay Aleksandrovich Pankov and Nina Dudarova.

A General Association of the Gypsies of Romania was established in 1933 with the holding of a national conference and the publication of two journals, Neamul Țiganesc ("Gypsy nation") and Timpul "time"). An "international" conference was organized in Bucharest the following year.

In Yugoslavia, the publication of the Romani journal Romano Lil was started in 1935.

=== Porajmos ===
During World War II and the Holocaust, the Nazis murdered 220,000 to 500,000 Romanis in a genocide referred to as the Porajmos. Like the Jews, they were segregated and forced to move into ghettos before they were sent to concentration or extermination camps. They were frequently killed on sight by the Einsatzgruppen, especially on the Eastern Front. According to Donald Kenrick and Grattan Puxon, between 25 and 50% of European Roma are estimated to have died in the genocide. Some populations in the Balkans were annihilated entirely.

=== Post-war history ===
In Communist Central and Eastern Europe, the Romani experienced assimilation schemes and restrictions on their cultural freedom. In public, the speaking of the Romani language and playing of Romani music were both banned in Bulgaria. In Czechoslovakia, tens of thousands of Romanis from Slovakia, Hungary, and Romania were re-settled in the border areas of the Czech lands, and their nomadic lifestyle was forbidden. In Czechoslovakia, where they were considered a "socially degraded stratum", Romani women were sterilized as part of a state policy to reduce their population. This policy was implemented with large financial incentives, threats to withhold future social welfare payments, misinformation, and involuntary sterilization.

In the early 1990s, Germany deported tens of thousands of migrants to Central and Eastern Europe. Sixty percent of some 100,000 Romanian nationals who were deported under a 1992 treaty were Romani.

In 2005, the Decade of Roma Inclusion was launched in nine Central and Southeastern European countries, in an attempt to improve the socio-economic status and increase the social inclusion of the Romani minority across the region. The project initiated important processes for Roma inclusion in Europe and provided the impetus for an EU-led effort to cover similar subject matter, the EU Framework for National Roma Integration Strategies up to 2020 (EU Framework).

== Americas ==
Romani people immigrated to the United States during colonial times, with small groups settling in Virginia and French Louisiana. Larger-scale immigration began in the 1860s, with groups of Romanis from Britain.

=== 1997 Czech-Canadian exodus ===
In August 1997, TV Nova, a Czech television station, broadcast a documentary about the situation of Romanis who had emigrated to Canada. The short report claimed that they were living comfortably with support from the state and that they were being sheltered from racial discrimination and violence. At the time, life was particularly difficult for many Romanis in Czechia. As a result of the dissolution of Czechoslovakia, many Romanis were left without citizenship in either the Czechia or Slovakia. Following major floods in Moravia in July 1997, many Romanis were left homeless and unwelcome in other parts of the country.

Almost overnight, there were reports of Romanies preparing to emigrate to Canada. According to one report, 5,000 from the city of Ostrava intended to move. Mayors of some Czech towns encouraged the exodus, offering to help pay for flights so that Romanis could leave. The following week, the Canadian embassy in Prague received hundreds of calls from Romanis every day, and flights between Czechia and Canada were sold out until October. In 1997, 1,285 people from Czechia arrived in Canada and claimed refugee status, a rather significant jump from the 189 Czechs who did so the previous year.

Lucie Čermáková, a spokesperson at the Canadian embassy in Prague, criticized the program, claiming that it "presented only one side of the matter and picked out only nonsensical ideas". Marie Jurkovičova, a spokesperson for the Czech embassy in Ottawa, suggested that "the program was full of half-truths, which strongly distorted reality and practically invited the exodus of large groups of Czech Romanies. It concealed a number of facts."

Up to that point, the movement of Romanis to Canada had been fairly easy, because visa requirements for Czech citizens had been lifted by the Canadian government in April 1996. In response to the sudden influx, the Canadian government reinstated visa requirements for all Czechs as of 8 October 1997.

== Romani nation ==
Flag of the Romani people

The first World Romani Congress was held near London, England, in 1971. It was attended by representatives from 21 countries. At the congress, the green and blue flag that was unfurled at the 1933 conference, embellished with the red, sixteen-spoked chakra, was reaffirmed as the national emblem of the Romani people, and the song "Gelem, Gelem" was adopted as their national anthem.

The International Romani Union was officially established in 1977, and in 1990, the fourth World Congress declared that 8 April is the International Day of the Roma, a day to celebrate Romani culture and raise awareness of the issues affecting the Romani community.

Romanestan is the proposed independent state of Romani people, although in 2000, the 5th World Romani Congress issued an official declaration in which it stated that the Romani people are a non-territorial nation.

== See also ==
- Timeline of Romani history
- Doma (caste)
- Romani diaspora
- Names of the Romani people
