= Flag of the Romani people =

Ethnic flag

- Other names: O styago le romengo, O romanko flako
- Use: Ethnic flag
- Adopted: 1971; 1978
- Designed by: Gheorghe A. Lăzăreanu-Lăzurică (purported); World Romani Congress; Weer Rajendra Rishi
- Use: Unofficial variant
- Adopted: 1971
- Designed by: Slobodan Berberski; World Romani Congress

The Romani flag (Romani: O styago le romengo or O romanko flako) is the international ethnic flag of the Romani people, historically known as Gypsies. They constitute a stateless minority concentrated in Europe, but are also dispersed across parts of other continents. The flag was approved by the representatives of various Romani communities at the first and second World Romani Congresses (WRC), in 1971 and 1978. It consists of a background of blue and green, representing the heavens and earth, respectively; it also contains a 16-spoke red dharmachakra, or cartwheel, in the center. The latter element stands for the itinerant tradition of the Romani people and is also an homage to the flag of India, added to the flag by scholar Weer Rajendra Rishi. It superseded a number of tribal emblems and banners, several of which evoked claims of Romani descent from the Ancient Egyptians.

Older Romani symbolism comprises insignia reflecting occupational and tribal divisions, as well totems and pictograms. In some cases, Romani "Kings" and "Princes" were also integrated within the European heraldic tradition with coats of arms of their own. As a result of this synthesis, "Egyptians" became visually associated with heraldic animals, including the adder and, in the 19th century, the hedgehog. Around 1890, affiliates of the Gypsy Lore Society had deduced that a tricolor of red-yellow-black was preferred by the Spanish Romanies, and embraced it as a generic Romani symbol. In the Balkans at large, corporate representation was granted to the Gypsy esnaf—which preceded the creation of modern professional unions, all of which had their own seals or flags. The first stages of identity politics in the 20th century saw the emergence of Romani political groups, but their designs remained attached to those of more dominant cultural nationalisms in their respective country. Into the interwar era, the various and competing Romani flags were mostly based on Romanian, Polish, communist, or Islamic symbolism.

The 1971 flag claimed to revive a plain blue-green bicolor, reportedly created by activist Gheorghe A. Lăzăreanu-Lăzurică in interwar Greater Romania. This design had been endorsed in the 1950s by Ionel Rotaru, who also claimed it as a flag for an independent settlement area, or "Romanestan". A tricolor version, flown by survivors of the Romani genocide, fell out of use due to allegations that it stood for communism. Rishi's definitive variant of 1978, with the added wheel, gained in popularity over the late 20th century; it is especially associated with groups which are advocating the transnational unity of the Romani people and combating its designation as "Gypsies". This flag was promoted by actor Yul Brynner, writer Ronald Lee, and violinist Yehudi Menuhin, and it was also adopted by "King" Florin Cioabă. It was especially popular in Socialist Yugoslavia, which awarded it official recognition upon its adoption.

The WRC Congress never provided specifications for the flag, which exists in various versions and has many derivatives, including national flags defaced with Rishi's dharmachakra. Several countries and communities have officially recognized it during the 2010s, but its display has sparked controversy in various parts of the European Union. Derivatives were also widely used in Romani political symbolism during the same period. However, inside the scholarly community, the Romani flag has been criticized as a Eurocentric symbol, and its display as a perfunctory solution to issues which are faced by the ethnic group which it represents. It has continuously been rejected by various Romani tribes, as well as by the Ashkali and Balkan Egyptians, who form a distinct ethnicity.

== History ==
=== Original symbols ===
Scholar Konstantin Stoyanovitch notes that Romani subgroups, such as the Lovari, traditionally employed a set of quasi-heraldic symbols: "Each tribe [has] its own emblem or marking, the equivalent of a flag. This sign consists of a small piece of wood bearing some notches, or a piece of fabric or threads of various colors, or even a branch torn off the tribe's favorite tree, a tree it considered to be its own (sort of like a totem). It is only shown within the limits of a territory only used for a certain group's travels." Romanies, along with the various other "traveling people" of Europe, used "rudimentary hieroglyphs" to mark their territories; art historian Amanda Wasielewski suggests that such practices survive in the "international squatters' symbol", which is indirectly based on "gypsy symbols or rogue signs". Travel writer George Borrow likened the secretive tribal folklore, or "Gipsyism", to Masonic ritual and symbolism. Borrow listed tents, hammers, tongs, tin kettles, creels, and cuddies as some of the Romanies' "banners and mottoes". A late-18th-century etching by Francis Wheatley shows the "genuine dwellings of English Gypsies of that date", alongside a "strange object hung on a pole". This is tentatively identified as a drag harrow, suggesting that the camp was one of "smiths, who made or repaired such tools." Within Romani encampments, the usage of cloth markers extends to the practice of segregating menstruating women and their garments. Anthropologist Judith Okely proposes that "the tea towel hanging separately to dry on a line becomes a flag of ethnic purity". A specific flag (steagu), fashioned from white scarf and red ribbon tied to a willow rod, appears during Gurban festival as practiced by the Boyash of Grebenac.

Folklorist David MacRitchie, building on ethnological observations made Heinrich von Wlislocki among the Hungarian Romanies, notes the existence of an established tradition in the Kingdom of Hungary, where tribal chiefs, oftentimes styled as "Kings of Egypt/of the Gypsies", wore "the serpent engraved on the silver buttons on their coats". MacRitchie speculates that the three adders on a shield at Nunraw armorial, in the Kingdom of Scotland, may therefore connect to John Faa and the Scottish Romanichal. In the 1860s, John's nominal descendant, Esther Faa Blythe of Kirk Yetholm, used a tinsel coronet with the Scottish thistle. Several 15th-century sources report the existence of heraldic symbols associated with nomadic "Gypsy Princes" from the Holy Roman Empire. One such figure, named Panuel, used a crowned golden eagle, while another one, Bautma, had a complex coat of arms, incorporating a scimitar and a crowned rooster; both figures also used hounds as their heraldic animal, with Panuel's being a badge. A 1498 epitaph at Pforzheim commemorates a Freigraf of "Little Egypt", in fact a Romani tribal leader. His attached coat of arms has the star and crescent in combination with the stag. In Wallachia and Moldavia, where they were kept as princely slaves, Romani craftsmen were directly involved in fabricating heraldic seals, albeit of a rudimentary kind.

At the turn of the 18th century, the disunity and symbolic disorder of Romani tribes was a subject matter in Ion Budai-Deleanu's mock-epic, Țiganiada. A Romanian proto-nationalist of the Transylvanian School, Budai probably hinted at political disentanglement within his own ethnic community; Țiganiada shows Gypsies marking under numerous vexilloids: a shovel for the Boyash, a copper tray for the Kalderash, a stuffed crow for the Argintari, and a red sieve, painted on white rawhide leather, for the Ciurari. In the 1830s, the English philanthropist James Crabb recalled meeting a Romani fortune-teller, whose saddle was "literally studded with silver; for she carried on it the emblems of her profession wrought in that metal; namely, a half-moon, seven stars, and the rising sun." A group of Ursari captured in 1872 at Fribourg reportedly wore red bonnets. By that stage, some Romani symbols had embraced more than tribal groups. These include a red banner carried by Turkish Romanies, all of whom belonged to a special esnaf (guild) of the Ottoman Empire. Gypsies also served the Austrian Empire in Serbian Vojvodina during 1848, when they reportedly wore "colourful garbs" and carried their own banners. A banner of the Kosovar Gypsies, dating from 1849, is still preserved in Prizren.

British traditions tended to regard combinations of yellow and red, or yellow-red-black as "Gypsy". An English, non-Romani, cricket club called I Zingari ("The Gypsies") was established in 1845, with red, yellow (or gold), and black as its colors. "The oldest extant club colours in the UK", these had a contextual meaning, symbolizing the "coming out of darkness, through fire, and into light." In 1890, one unnamed member of the Gypsy Lore Society (GLS) proposed that the European Gypsies were generally using red and yellow as their distinctive colors. He noted their recurrence in both the Romani folk dress and I Zingari kits, as well as the identification of "red and yellow for Romany" in one English rhyme. The same source rendered the words of a "Romany chal in Spain", according to whom there was a "tacit recognition" of red-yellow-black as a tribal tricolor; in that instance, the former two colors also replicated the Spanish red-weld. The tricolor scheme had by then appeared on the cover of Borrow's Romany Vocabulary, printed in London for GLS use (1889). MacRitchie placed doubt on this claim, noting that in earlier testimonies by Walter Simson the colors of Scottish Romani costumes are depicted as primarily green. In a 1907 report for the GLS, James Yoxall briefly discussed "why yellow is so much a Gypsy colour". Yoxall hypothesized that a "distinctive hue" may have been forced "upon the wanderers of the roads" in medieval times, the same as yellow badges had been imposed on Jews. Writing a year later, MacRitchie noted the "Gypsy colours of Spain" as used on Andrew McCormick's monograph of The Tinkler-Gypsies. He credited "the late Lord Lilford" as the ultimate source for the information published by the GLS in 1890.

In Austria-Hungary, all Gypsies were informally attributed a "coat of arms" displaying the hedgehog. This was first used by Archduke Joseph Karl on his 1886 treatise, Czigány nyelvtan (where the animal is shown "with a twig in its mouth"), and later etched into János Bihari's monument on Margaret Island. The selection was validated by scholar Emil Ponori Thewrewk, who argued that the hedgehog was an "emblem shared by all the Gypsies", adding: "Gypsies from different countries distinguish themselves with hedgehogs that hold various cones or leaves (namely pine cones, birch or hawthorn leaves) in its mouth." In 1888, Orientalist Wilhelm Solf described the "peculiar organisation of the Gypsies" in the German Empire. According to Solf, the tribal "captains" of the German Romanies each kept an "official seal, upon which a hedgehog is engraved—a beast held as sacred by all the Gypsies"; similarly, all groups favored the color green, symbolic of "honour". There were three German Gypsy tribes, named for their respective area: Old Prussia, which carried a black-and-white flag defaced with a fir tree; New Prussia—green-and-white, with a birch tree; and Hanover—gold-blue-white with a mulberry tree. GLS folklorist Friedrich Wilhelm Brepohl noted in 1911 that "Gypsy Princes" in Switzerland and elsewhere had coats of arms depicting "either a hedgehog, which is the gypsy's favorite animal, or a magpie—the sacred bird of the gypsies." Guild organization was meanwhile maintained in the post-Ottoman Principality of Bulgaria—an association of Bulgarian Romani porters was set up in 1901; its flag is also preserved. In 1910, Vidin became home to the first-ever civic organization for Romanies (still describing themselves as the "Egyptian Nation" or "Copts"). Its emblem showed Saint George slaying a crocodile, which, the group explained, was symbolic of Christianity vanquishing Egyptian paganism.

Early Romani heraldry

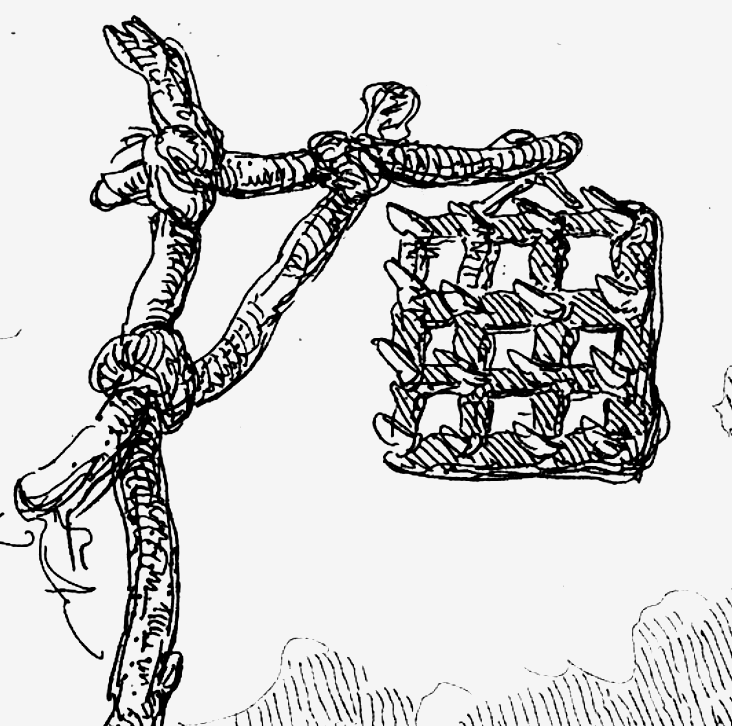
Detail of Francis Wheatley's etching, showing the drag harrow as a purported Gypsy symbol

Arms of the Freigraf of "Little Egypt" in the Pforzheim armorial

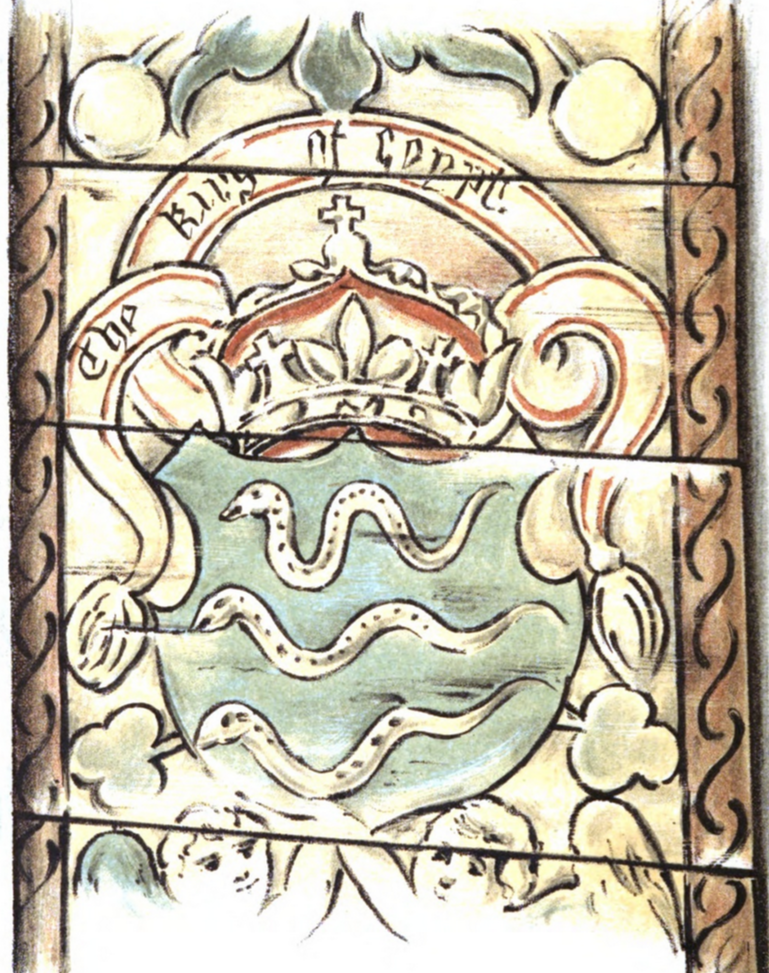
David MacRitchie's reproduction of the "King of Egypt" arms in Nunraw

"Gypsy colours of Spain", as reported by Lord Lilford

Gypsy hedgehog emblem, as popularized by Archduke Joseph Karl

=== Romany Zoria, UGRR, and the Kwieks ===
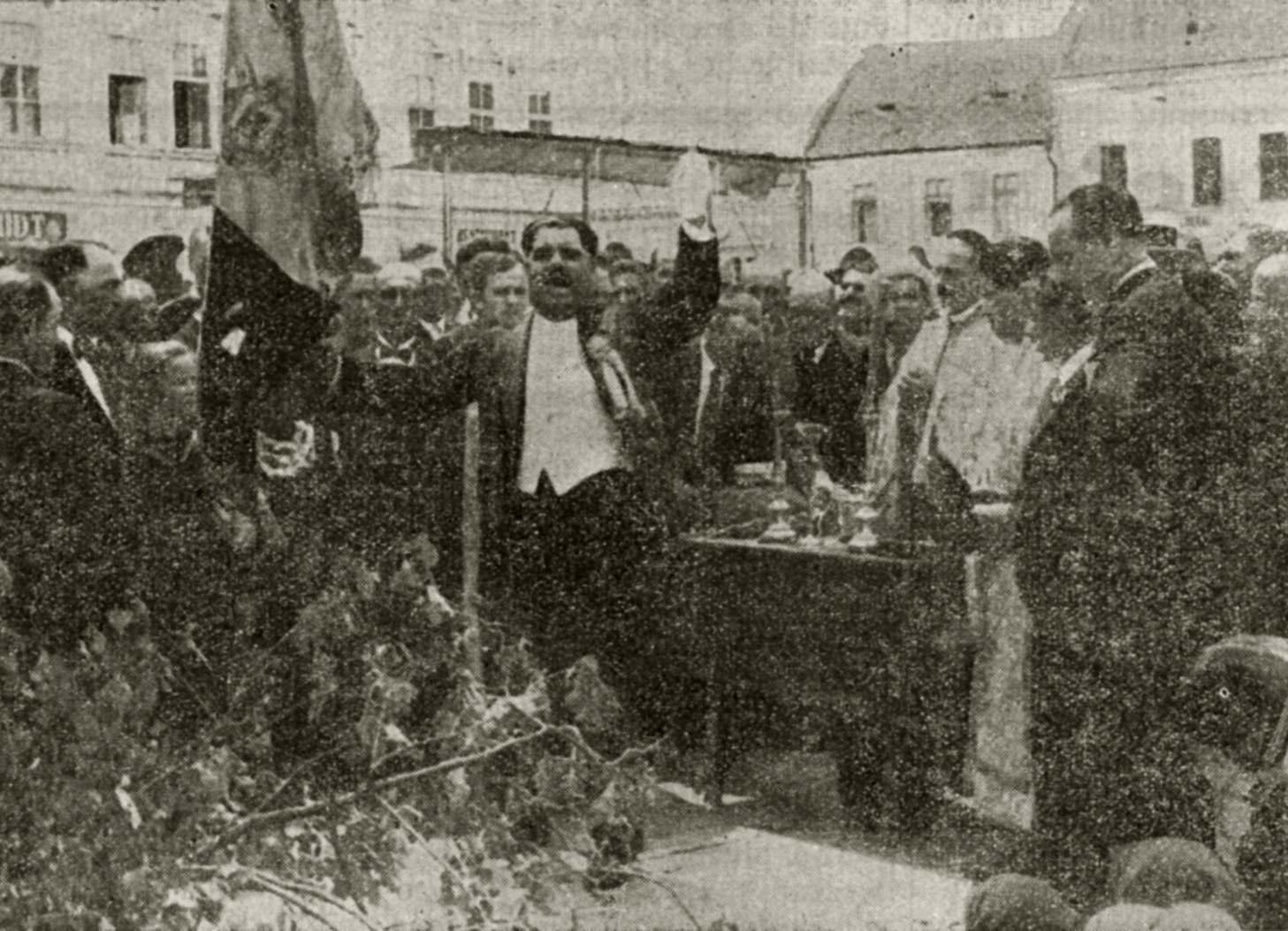
Gheorghe Nicolescu holding up the UGRR organizational flag during a speech in Făgăraș (June 1935)

The emergence Romani nationalism after World War I coincided roughly with the spread of communism and the proclamation of the Soviet Union. Groups which embraced both ideals also replicated communist symbolism. One early case was the Kingdom of Bulgaria, where left-wing Romanies established in 1920 an Egypt society, functioning as a branch of the Bulgarian Communist Party. This organization adopted a "wine-red flag". In 1923, a small group of Russian Romanies appeared at the May Day parade in Red Square, holding up a banner inscribed with the message: "Gypsy Workers of the World, Unite!" Romany Zoria appeared in late 1927 as a Soviet propaganda journal aimed at the Romani community, and aiming for their complete sedentarization as proletarians. It repeated the slogan, and published illustrations of the Romanies trampling on symbols of their nomadic lifestyle—primarily including the cartwheel. In the early 1930s, Stalinist authorities envisaged colonizing Soviet Romanies and Assyrians "in compact groups to form [their own] national territories" along the border; a blueprint for this policy was set by the Jewish Autonomous Oblast.

Greater Romania, as the home of a sizable Romani minority (including formerly Hungarian Romani communities in Transylvania), witnessed some of the first manifestations of Romani nationalism. In 1923, the Romanies of Teaca affirmed their collective existence as a "new minority" of "Transylvanian Gypsies", by adopting a flag. Its design is not specified beyond the colors, namely "black–yellow–red." Among the early Romanian Romani organizers, Lazăr Naftanailă is known to have worn the Romanian national tricolor as a sash.

According to historian Ian Hancock, the current flag originates with the world Romani flag proposed in late 1933 by Romania's General Union of the Romanies (UGRR), upon the initiative of Gheorghe A. Lăzăreanu-Lăzurică; the chakra was absent from that version, which was a plain bicolor. Scholar Ilona Klímová-Alexander argues that such a detail is "not confirmed by the statutes or any other source." Other historians, including Elena Marushiakova, note the "lack of any real historical evidence" to substantiate Hancock's account, which they describe as a sample of "nation-building" mythology. Sociologist Jean-Pierre Liégeois also describes the UGRR's Romani flag as a theorized concept, rather than an actual design, whereas scholar Whitney Smith believes that the bicolor existed, but also that its designer remains unknown. Lăzurică's organization had its own, better attested, flag, used to represent Romania's Romani community. It was described in the UGRR charter as a defaced Romanian tricolor, or "the Romanian national colors". Its symbolism combined the national coat of arms with symbols of Romani tribes: "a violin, an anvil, a compass and a trowel crossed with a hammer." The UGRR also used at least 36 regional flags, which were usually blessed in public ceremonies by representatives of the Romanian Orthodox Church, to which Lăzurică belonged. One meeting held at Mediaș in May 1934 had vexilla, "similar to the flags of the old Roman legions", topped by tuning forks.

In neighboring Poland, a Kalderash man, Matejasz Kwiek, established himself as a "King of the Gypsies". Though his clan was regarded by mainstream Polish Romanies as "Rumanian Gypsies", he remained indifferent to Lăzurică's projects. A February 1935 report mentions various "Gypsy banners", as well as a sash and an "official seal", appearing at a ceremony in which Kwiek became "Leader of the Gypsy Nation". One account suggests that King Matejasz's arms showed a Pharaoh's crown alongside three symbols of the Romanies' "wandering life": a hammer, anvil and whip. The king's funeral in 1937 saw the flying of various blue and red banners, with slogans espousing Kwiek's loyalty toward Polish nationalism. One report in the Journal des Débats describes the procession as carrying an ethnic flag "with the Kwiek dynastic emblem", alongside the flag of Poland.

Following the ascension of Janusz Kwiek to the throne in Warsaw, journalists noted that the "Gypsy kingdom" was not yet flying a single flag of its own, and that "banners of various colors" were used. A report in the Romanian newspaper Foaia Poporului described them more specifically as "hundreds of Gypsy flags, colored red, green, rose, and yellow." Regional symbols also prevailed in Bulgaria: from 1930, its "Mohammedan" Romanies prioritized the star and crescent as symbols of Islam. In the Kingdom of Yugoslavia, Romanies united around the cult of Saint Sarah as Bibija used a blue banner displaying Sarah and Saint Nicholas together. The Panhellenic Cultural Association of the Greek Gypsies, active under the Metaxas Regime, used a flag of unspecified color, adorned with the image of Saint Sophia. In Britain, GLS affiliates such as Augustus John promoted the red-yellow-black arrangement as "Romany colours". These were used on the cover of the GLS Journal for the 1938 Jubilee issue.

Janusz Kwiek began to look into territorial nationalism, drawing up a "government program" for a Romani state, and envisaging mass migration into Italian Ethiopia. His project coincided with the agenda of Italian fascism, namely the deportation of peninsular Jews and "other persons who were considered racially dangerous, such as gypsies", to the new East African provinces. By the mid 1930s, the initiative to use and recognize an international flag was taken up by the UGRR's new president, Gheorghe Nicolescu; at the time, he corresponded with Kwiek's rival King, Mikita, who wished to establish a Romani state on the Ganges, or in Africa. The "national Gypsy assembly", which he and Naftanailă convened in Sibiu in September 1934, had "about 72 flags" on display. According to one report, the 1935 Romani congress in Bucharest, presided over by Nicolescu, had the "Romany flag" displayed alongside portraits of Adolf Hitler and Michael I of Romania. Nicolescu soon proclaimed himself a Gypsy King—and, according to writer Mabel Farley Nandriș, who visited him in his Bucharest home, flew the "Gypsy standard with the Rumanian Arms on one side and the Gypsy Arms on the other—a pair of compasses to measure justice and a lute for music." By 1937, his admiration for Nazism and the National Christian Party also resulted in UGRR usage of swastikas.

Despite such "alliances of Roma activists with leading political forces", the 1933 international flag, if it had ever been used at that time, virtually disappeared by the time of World War II; many European tribes were decimated in the Romani genocide, itself part of the Holocaust. During this period, many Romanies also went into hiding or they denied their identities in order to escape from the Einsatzgruppen or avoid deportation. In one incident which was reported at Simferopol in 1941, Crimean Romanies flew the green flag of Islam, hoping to make the Nazis believe that they were either Tatars or Turks. Žarko Jovanović, a survivor of the Jasenovac concentration camp, recorded the Holocaust experience in various songs. One of these, Jeg djesoro ratvalo avilo ("A Day Turned Bloody"), refers to the "Gypsy flag" (o romanko flako) being hoisted in honor of Romani continuity.

=== Rotaru episode ===
Early in the Cold War era, ethnic symbolism experienced a resurgence. Active in 1945–1948, the United Gypsy Organization in Bulgaria used a "red [flag] with two white fields and with a triangle in the middle." A rival Bulgarian Romani body, called Ekipe, mentioned both the Romani state and the Romani national flag in its charter, though it failed to describe the latter in sufficient detail. In 1946, Kwiek, having survived in Holocaust in hiding, returned to regular life in the Polish People's Republic. He renounced his claim to the Romani throne, as well as his itinerant lifestyle, and asked instead to be recognized as "President". Writer Jerzy Ficowski, who identifies him as "Rudolf Kwiek", reports that he was still a monarch to his followers, having been reconfirmed as such with a ceremony in Bydgoszcz; also according to Ficowski, the Kwiek royal seal was "a crow holding a ring in its beak." From 1955, a "flag of the Gypsies" has represented Romani pilgrims to the Sanctuary of Our Lady of Lourdes. It is described as a sixteen-ray comet on a field of starry blue with the effigies of Christ and the Virgin Mary. The item is explained in more detail as a "grand flag of the night, carrying the Star of the Magi", though other sources have "a yellow sun shining on a blue field."

Meanwhile, the bicolor flag had either resurfaced or was being revived by Ionel Rotaru. According to Liégeois' interviewees in the Romani community, he was "not at all a Gypsy, but rather a Romanian", and acted mainly as a confidence artist; he had authored novels which reportedly showed his fascist sympathies. From his place of refuge in France, Rotaru envisaged the creation of a Romani state, now named "Romanestan", and he showed its flag to journalist Nico Rost. Several accounts suggest that he originally obtained recognition as "Voivode" by 75,000 Romanies at Ankara, in December 1958. On May 24, 1959, he crowned himself at Enghien-les-Bains as "Vaïda Voëvod III", Supreme Leader of the Ursari tribe (though explicitly not as the "King of the Gypsies"), and formed a nucleus of the International Romani Union. This group earned recognition from the Kwieks (who had also escaped to France), and established its first local chapter in Poland.

The bicolor appeared in Rotaru's sash, presented to him alongside a sword and a necklace. His charter suggested that the color green stood for "land covered in vegetation" and a "world without borders", with blue as a stand-in for the "cosmos and liberty". Unusually, the horizontal display was explained in relation to the vertical flagpole, which represented "the line of profundity of our thinking"; the adoption of a heraldic device was announced, but postponed for "when the time comes." By 1961, Rotaru openly claimed the bicolor as the state flag of Romanestan; in this context, the blue was explained as representing freedom. The location of his proposed state constantly shifted, from Somalia or a "small desert island" to an area around Lyon. Around 1970, Rotaru was issuing Romani "identity cards" which were decked in blue and green.

These projects were registered with alarm by French intelligence, which kept Rotaru under watch as a possible communist infiltrator who was serving the Eastern bloc. Its agents also believed that Vaïda and Rotaru were not the same person—instead, they listed Vaïda as Rotaru's figurehead. The Somalian relocation plan was received with distress by many of Rotaru's nominal subjects, who feared that various nation-states would unilaterally endorse it, using it is an excuse to expel the Romanies from Europe. From September 1969, his undertaking was being met with some opposition by a rival organization, GIPSAR, formed by expatriate Croatian, Serb and Macedonian Romanies. GIPSAR sent Zivan (or Sivan) Vasic, "president of the Gypsy government", as its representative to the funeral of Charles de Gaulle in late 1970, where he carried a Romani banner; France-Soir mistakenly identified Vasic as Vaïda Voéva [sic], but then issued a correction, which also indicated that the GIPSAR bicolor was "black and green". His claim to represent the Romanies, and more specifically the Manushes, was relinquished at a press conference in 1974.

Lăzurică and Vaïda's flag faced additional competition from a green-red-blue horizontal triband, which stripes respectively representing the grass, fire, and the skies. By 1962, it had become highly popular among Romani communities. During that interval, references to this symbolism were promoted by Francoist Spain as less contentious than left-wing symbolism favored by local Romanies. A reference to the "Republican flag", in La Niña de los Peines' Triana, was changed by censorship to read "Gypsy flags" (banderitas gitanas). Suspicions that the tricolor's prominently displayed red stood for communism led some activists to promote a green-blue bicolor with a red flame or wheel instead of the stripe. An alternative flag of Romanestan was being proposed in 1966 by a Turkish Rom, Nazım Taşkent—it showed violins, guitars and drums on a pink background. Three years later, Romanies gathering at Banneux in Wallonia had a multitude of flags, in various colors, some of them displaying images of Our Lady of the Poor, alongside caravans.

Evolution of the Romani flag

Variant reportedly advanced by the UGRR ca. 1933

Triband version (1960s)

Variant with flame (1960s)

GIPSAR banner (1970)

=== WRC adoption ===
In the late 1960s, an "International Gypsy Committee", presided upon by Vanko Rouda, validated continued usage of the blue-green bicolor. The group also announced in 1968 that it would institute a Blue Green Literary Award, named in honor of the flag; activist Leuléa Rouda explained that these were the "colors of the Gypsy flag", "colors of liberty and hope, of sky and nature". The following year, Rotaru's Comité International Tsigane attended a reunion of the Council of Europe in Strasbourg. Delegates carried with them a "Gypsy flag" of blue and green, though their version broke with earlier banners, in being "divided not horizontally but diagonally". A red-wheel variant was eventually selected as the standardized design, as recognized by the World Romani Congress (WRC). Reportedly, the bicolor background was specifically proposed by Jan Cibula, who established its pedigree as originating with "the pre-war Bucharest congress."

The original WRC congress of 1971, held at Orpington, only confirmed the bicolor, though specifying that a "red fire", "thin stripe", or "wheel" could also be added. This was a compromise version to appease Slobodan Berberski and other communist delegates, who had campaigned for the addition of a red star. The work in its definitive form is attributed to an Indian Romologist, Weer Rajendra Rishi. Specifications were also adopted at subsequent WRC meetings, especially during the second congress of 1978. The wheel was not only made a permanent feature of the flag, but was also explicitly based on the Ashoka Chakra, as used in the flag of India. The decision to include "something Indian" on the flag was generally popular, reflecting in part Rishi's theories, according to which Romanies were a "medieval warrior caste" akin to Rajputs. Reportedly, this variant defeated proposals by other attendees, who supported "earlier flags which had depicted an icon of a horse". Several activists were upset by Rishi's intervention, feeling that the chakra was an outside symbol, and as such one "thrust upon them". As noted by Smith, the international flag did not detail specifications such as designs or Pantone values. The original WRC design described a "carriage wheel" which did not closely resemble the chakra; chakra-like designs are therefore more recent. Painter Michel Van Hamme, who claims to have contributed in constructing the wheel flag, notes that the sixteen spokes stood for 16 centuries of nomadism.

According to sociologist Lídia Balogh, the Romani flag retained Indian symbolism, but was still readable without it: "The wheel can also refer to the eternal cycle of the world, or it can be interpreted as a carriage wheel". One complex explanation of the resulting composition is favored by the Romanies of Brazil. According to these sources, the upper blue half represents heavens, as well as "liberty and peace", as "fundamental Gypsy values"; the green is a reference to "nature and routes explored by the caravans". The red wheel is "life, continuity and tradition, the road traveled and still ahead", with the spokes evoking "fire, transformation, and constant movement." According to ethnologist Ion Duminică, it stands for the "Road of Life", with red as an allusion to the "vitality of blood." Duminică also explains the blue as a reference to "Heavens-Father-God" and to the ideals of "liberty and cleanliness, the unbound space"; whereas green is a stand-in for "Mother Earth". Balogh also notes that the two stripes can be deciphered "without any particular cultural background knowledge" as being the sky, implicitly a symbol of "freedom and transcendence", and the earth; she views the red as a reference to blood, with its dual meaning: "blood is the symbol of life, on the one hand, and the blood spilled on wars and destruction."

As sociologist Oana Marcu argues, the reference to "perpetual movement" signified that the Romanies were proudly accepting their nomadic traditions, previously seen as "socially dangerous". According to Balogh, the wheel recalls ancient nomadism, but also the Romanies' participation in the 21st-century economic migration across Europe. Similarly, Duminică writes about symbols of nomadic life as evoking prosperity, since "with no opportunity to perambulate, Romanies will fall prey to poverty." Activist Juan de Dios Ramírez Heredia explained it as a "cartwheel standing in for freedom, which is characteristic of our culture." However, in order to honor the"continuous and varied" support it had received from Socialist Yugoslavia, the WRC also accepted Berberski's star on unofficial variants, specifically referencing the Yugoslav flag. Yugoslavia also pioneered the official Romani flag, which was given recognition in the constituent Socialist Republic of Macedonia as early as 1971 (or 1972). This was the culmination of efforts by Faik Abdi, a Macedonian Rom. The symbol was especially important for the Gurbeti around Skopje, who integrated it within wedding ceremonies, and was also popularized on album covers by Žarko Jovanović.

Alternative flag for survivors of the Romani genocide, as used at Fort Mont-Valérien in 1975

During the Catholic Jubilee of 1975, Manushes gathered at Primavalle under a "blue banner, with the crowned figure of Our Lady of the Gypsies and a caravan, topped by a tiny tricolor pennant." By then, the WRC variant was being used for remembering the 1940s genocide, beginning with a ceremony held at Natzweiler-Struthof in June 1973. In January 1975, writer-activist Matéo Maximoff and a "large Gypsy delegation" took "the blue-and-green flag" to the Gypsy family camp at Auschwitz. In this commemorative context, however, the consecrated flag was sometimes replaced by other symbols: in April 1975, Romani Holocaust survivors were represented at Fort Mont-Valérien by a never-before-seen banner, displaying a plum or violet triangle on white. This was a visual clue to Nazi concentration camp badges, and, according to journalist Jean-Pierre Quélin, was picked and designed by a Manush politician, Dany Peto-Manso, and carried on the field despite deprecatory remarks from members of the National Gendarmerie. Peto-Manso himself referred to flag as "hastily made", without specifying its author.

The WRC flag was given more exposure in 1978–1979, when a Romani delegation comprising Hancock and Yul Brynner presented it to the United Nations. The item was brought by the Canadian Romani writer Ronald Lee, and as such was also "the first Canadian Romani flag"—sewn by his daughter Diana. A "small organized group of Gypsies, with a flag and armbands", took part in the August 1980 pilgrimage to the Black Madonna of Częstochowa, in what was then the Polish People's Republic. In October 1983, the symbols were taken to Chandigarh in India for the WRC's second festival; the delegation, headed by the Yugoslav Rom Sait Balić, presented its host, Indira Gandhi, with a miniature Romani flag. Within the post-WRC setting, it remained especially important as a distinguishing symbol of NGOs who prefer the terms "Roma" and "Romani" over exonyms such as "Gypsies"; an example of this is the Roma Community Center in Toronto.

=== Spread ===
The Romani flag acquired an enhanced political status during the late stages of the Cold War. This was especially the case among Hungarian Romanies, who embraced cultural separatism. By 1995, a series of "naive science" works had been published there by unsigned Romani authors, with "the cover of each volume was designed based on the elements of the Gypsy flag." In the years leading up to the creation of a Gypsy Minority Self-Government, activists made a show of removing Hungarian flags from public meetings, which were held under all-Romani flags. In tandem, there was a resurgence of extreme Hungarian nationalism in places such as Kalocsa, where, in October 1989, the Romani support center was vandalized; reportedly, its Romani flag was "defaced with a swastika." The WRC flag was flown during the Velvet Revolution in the Czechoslovak Socialist Republic, in particular at a rally of Romani anti-communists, held outside Letná Park.

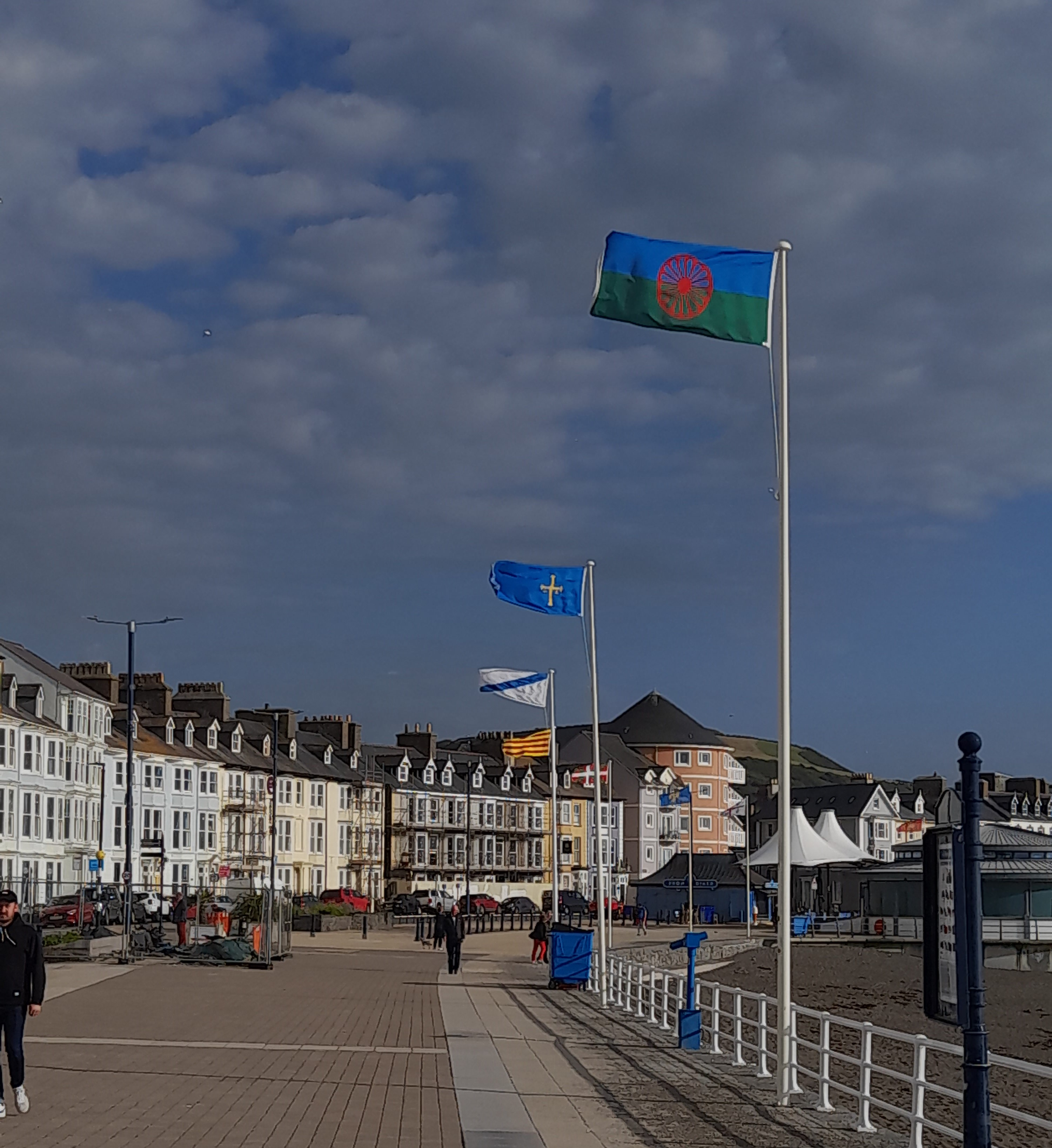
Romani flag displayed alongside those of Asturias, Galicia, and Catalonia in Aberystwyth (June 2022)

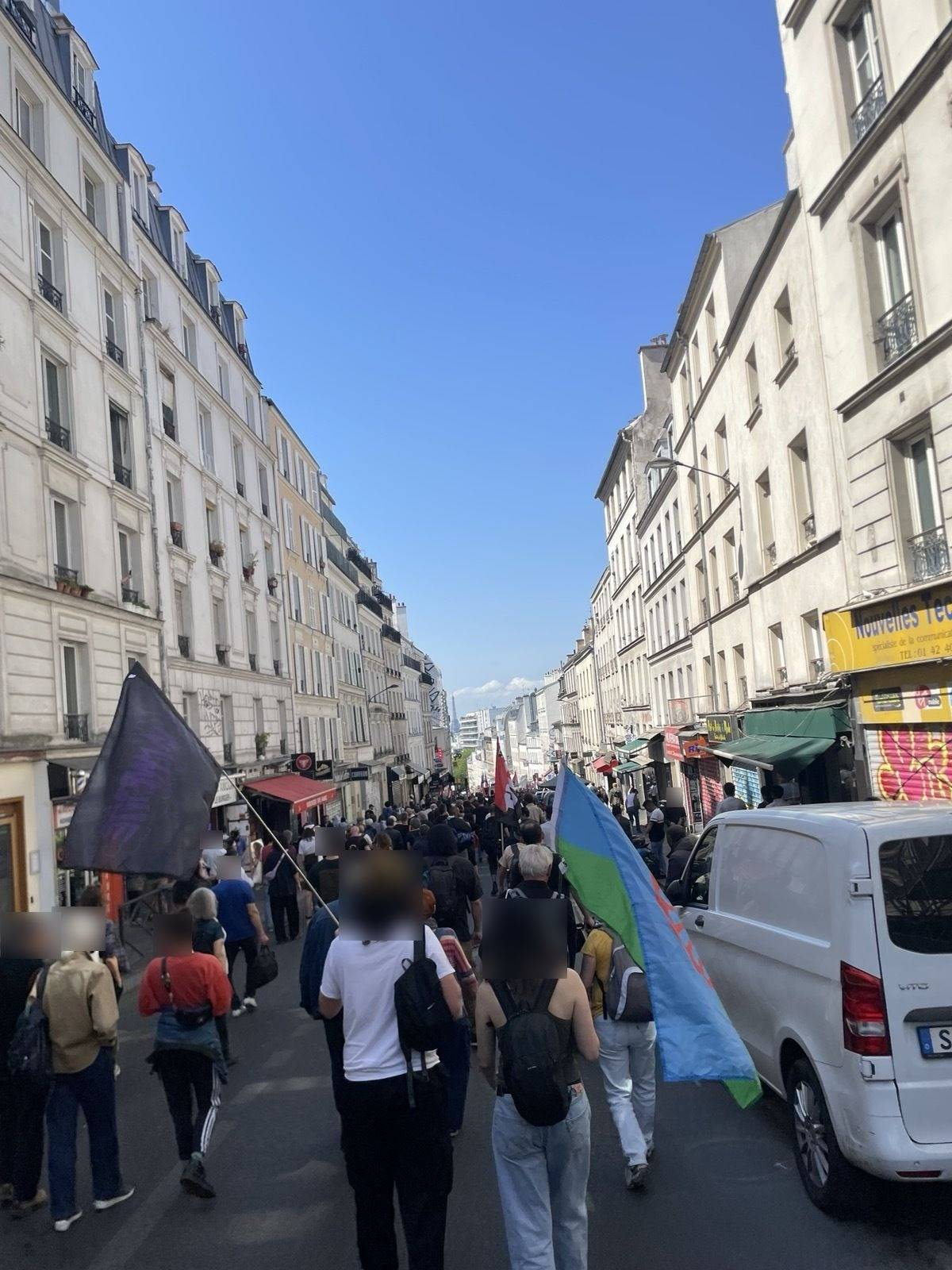
A self-identified "Tzigane" companion waving the Romani flag during the anarchist demonstration of May 1, 2026 in Paris

Several derivatives soon appeared on both sides of the former Iron Curtain. Following the dissolution of Czechoslovakia, Slovak Romanies adopted the WRC design with the wheel in yellow, combined with the Slovak tricolor. From about 1989, Croatian Romanies, represented by the "Democratic Party of the Croatian Roma", have used a variant of the chakra flag superimposed with the šahovnica. In July 1992, a casket containing the body of Camarón de la Isla, Spain's influential Rom singer, was draped with a purported "Gypsy flag". This showed a cartwheel and a map of Catalonia, both on a field of plain green. Later Catalan variants are more closely modeled on the 1978 flag, but have the red wheel outlined in yellow, perhaps to evoke the Senyera. A chakra-like derivative, or "round-wheeled Gypsy flag", also appears, along with the menorah, in the arms granted to Jewish violinist Yehudi Menuhin upon his creation as a British lord 1993; according to music critic Mark Swed, they are defiant symbols of Menuhin's nonconformity.

During mid-1994, the WRC flag was a central feature of the "Where Green Meets Blue" exhibit at Tarnów museum, as a culmination of Polish Romani festivals held across Outer Subcarpathia. The flag was fully integrated in Holocaust memorials by 1995, when it was shown at Auschwitz-Birkenau Memorial and Museum. A sculpture of the wagon wheel appears at the Bucharest monument commemorating the Holocaust in Romania, explained by curators as a symbol of its 11,000 Romani victims. After 2000, the WRC bicolor also acquired recognition from other national and regional governments. In 2006, as part of an effort to combat racism in Brazil, President Luiz Inácio Lula da Silva instituted a "National Day of the Gypsy" (May 24), during which the Romani flag was on display in official settings. The Romani community of Spain was similarly honored at various dates in 2018, when the Romani flag was displayed by for instance by the City Council of Madrid and its correspondent in Alicante. In October 2011, a similar initiative in the Welsh town of Aberystwyth resulted in controversy, after a local councilor had argued that the expenses were unjustified.

Since the 1990s, chakras and cartwheels have endured as major preferred symbols of Romani activism in Europe, being adopted by organizations such as Romani CRISS, the Social-Political Movement of the Roma, and the Museum of Romani Culture. The traditionally Romani Šuto Orizari Municipality, in North Macedonia, has "a colourful flag featuring the Roma wheel – an Indian chakra, which refers to the origin of the Roma people." Eight-spoked wheels are also popular as variations, used for instance by the Ciocănari Romanies of Moldova. In 2002, the Italian Rom artist Luca Vitone designed an anarchist version of the flag, featuring the red chakra on a field of black. By 2009, other derivatives of the Romani flag were becoming widely used by self-identified Manush or "Traveller" users of Facebook, sometimes combined with badges showing hedgehogs and images of caravans. Since 2007, the Venice Biennale experimented with separate pavilions for Romani artists, who exhibited "under the Romani flag, a flag of a borderless nation; a country embodied solely by those who dare to fly that flag." A controversy erupted in Prague during July 2013, when artist Tomáš Rafa displayed hybrid versions of the Romani and Czech flags. This commentary on the marginalization of Czech Romanies was read as a defamation of the national symbols, and resulted in Rafa being fined.

A 2009 study among Hungarian Romanies showed that many were recognizing the flag as standing in for the Romani nation as a whole. In subsequent years, it appeared during Romani Catholic pilgrimages to Pomezia, which commemorate Pope Paul VI's 1965 visit to a "tent city". In 2014, boxer Domenico Spada, an Italian Rom, announced that he would be competing under the ethnic flag in his match against Marco Antonio Rubio. He declared this a protest against Italy's alleged indifference toward his career. In late 2018, the symbol was spotted as one of the protest flags waved by the Yellow vests movement in France.

The flag also enjoys popularity in its purported native country, Romania, where it was flown privately by Vasile Velcu Năzdrăvan, a leader of the Romanies in Craiova. It was additionally used by Sibiu's "King of the Roma", Florin Cioabă, and other members of his clan. As early as 2002, Cioabă's daughter Luminița appeared at local festivities wearing "her traditional Roma costume, in the symbolic colors blue (for the sky), green (for the earth) and red (for the Roma), which can also be found in the Gypsy flag." Florin Cioabă's funeral ceremony in August 2013 reportedly displayed four flags: the WRC bicolor, the flag of Europe and the Romanian tricolor, alongside banners representing the royal house and the Stabor (Romani tribunal).

Variants and derivatives

Eight-spoked wheel variant used by the Hungarian Romanies

Variant seen in Romania's Călărași County

Old flag of Šuto Orizari Municipality, North Macedonia

One of Tomáš Rafa's Romani-themed variations on the Czech flag

Romani anarchist flag

Variant with the Union Jack in the canton

== Non-usage and alternatives ==
Writing about the Romanian Romanies in 2011, journalist Ben Judah viewed the bicolor as "a remnant of mostly failed efforts made by NGOs in the 1970s to unite and organize the Roma." In addition to raising controversy for its Indian symbolism, the flag has received criticism for being essentialist in relation to a complex identity. During the final years of the 20th century, activists such as Nicolae Gheorghe and Andrzej Mirga were heralding "a small but important movement away from the Romani nationalism of the International Romani Union", rejecting "the idealisation and romanticisation of Gypsy identity associated with such symbols as flags and anthems." As noted by philosopher David Kergel, the WRC flag inherently stands for the "effort to define the Roma as a nation without land and assimilate them into a concept of the national state", a Eurocentric vision which neglects that the Roma are in reality "heterogeneous". Similarly, anthropologist Carol Silverman notes that the bicolor and the Romani anthem are modeled on the "dominant European tropes of defining the heritage of a singular nation." Upon reviewing several editions of the Festival for Romani Music and Song in Stara Zagora, sociologist Nadezhda Georgieva remarked: "If a true feeling or expression of Romanes is to be sought, then the audience should be pointed out as one of the main participants in the show, as real artists, remaining faithful to their identity and sensitive to the changes dictated to them by any elites or institutions. They are the ones who build and dismantle ethnic boundaries [...]. This is where the real signs of Romanes should be sought; not in the official Romani symbols present on the stage such as the Romani flag or the playing of the Romani anthem, to which little attention was paid."

Another line of criticism refers to the perceived irrelevancy of the WRC flag. Already in 1977, ethnographer Zsolt Csalog observed that creating the flag was "more intended to hide away real issues than to solve them." In 2009, Jud Nirenberg of the European Roma Rights Centre reproached on the International Romani Union that it dealt mainly with promoting the flag and other symbols of Romani nationalism, rather than "develop[ing] concrete plans for addressing discrimination or poverty." The same year, three authors from the University of Manchester expressed criticism of the Black Health Agency's involvement in assisting Romanian Romani children in England; according to their finds, the Romanies were artificially separated from Romanians in the United Kingdom, and encouraged to adopt a "victim discourse" in describing their condition. The Agency's toolkit "features a theme on the Romani Flag and Anthem, both of which were previously unknown to most members of the local Roma community." Romani artist Damian Le Bas saluted the decision to exhibit Małgorzata Mirga-Tas' works in the Venice Biennale's Polish pavilion, and under the Polish flag. He argued that previous usage of the WRC bicolor had validated segregation: "Across Europe, the opinion that Romani people do not belong in the countries of which they are citizens is commonplace."

Several alternatives to the 1978 flag still emerged among dissenting Romani or itinerant groups. The Sinti, which stand apart as the more assimilated group of German Romanies, have been particularly reluctant in adopting national symbolism. As reported by scholars Gilad Margalit and Yaron Matras: "During the civic struggle of the early 1980s, Sinti organizations used the Romani national flag as well as rhetoric that contained certain elements borrowed from Romani nationalism, but these expressions had a rather superficial character and disappeared over the years. [...] Most German Sinti [...] prefer the assimilation model, with certain reservations that would enable them to preserve their unique ethnic subculture." In April 2015, Vocea Romilor, a newspaper for the Romanian Romanies, reported that the "Gypsies of Fața Luncii neighborhood" in Craiova put out Romanian flags on their gates, in protest against the usage of Székely flags by ethnic Hungarians. Activist Romeo Tiberiade explained: "the flag of this county, no matter the region, is but one [...]. We were upset that other citizens, belonging to a minority that is smaller in numbers than our own, have been putting out a flag other than the national one. The law is for all Romanians, and we are proud of being Romanians." In the Netherlands, Koko (or Koka) Petalo urged his followers to adopt a tricolor of yellow, white and red, while the Romanies of Extremadura use a "flag of horizontal white and green stripes" during their pilgrimage to Fregenal de la Sierra.

Along with other Romani symbols, the chakra is rejected by the Ashkali and Balkan Egyptians, who used two successive designs for their own ethnic flag; similarly, Romanies in the Epirus reportedly use a banner of the 1914 republic. The Dom people of the Middle East do not have any political symbols; this was noted in 2022 by scholar Ronen Zeidel, in reference to the Iraqi "Gypsies": "Unlike other Iraq minorities Gypsies have no flag, unique religion, territorial claims, and at present even their language is on the verge of extinction." Reports in 2004 noted that the Irish Travellers had considered creating their own flag, but also that they "may model [it] on the Roma standard, which bears an image of a 16-spoke wheel." In June 2018, the Travellers of Cork adopted a banner displaying a cartwheel and replicating the city colors of orange and white. Such projects were criticized from within the community by Travellers who argue for a "common identity we all share on the island of Ireland", and for Irish republicanism as its political expression. They voice their continued loyalty to, and preference for, the Irish tricolor. Similarly, anthropologist Marc Bordigoni observed that "certain [French] Traveller groups also make a point of distancing themselves from the French Romanies [...], as well as from those Romanies who are either refugees or migrants from Eastern European countries". Coalesced into the Collectif national des gens du Voyage and Voyageurs, Français à part entière, they use the French flag alongside pennons representing either of these groups.
