= Romani alphabets =

Written form of the Romani language

The Romani language has for most of its history been an entirely oral language, with no written form in common use. Although the first example of written Romani dates from 1542, it is not until the twentieth century that vernacular writing by native Romani people arose.

Printed anthologies of Romani folktales and poems began in the 20th century in Eastern Europe, using the respective national scripts (Latin or Cyrillic). Written Romani in the 20th century used the writing systems of their respective host societies, mostly Latin alphabets (Romanian, Italian, French, etc.).

== Standardization ==
Currently, there is no single standard orthography used by both scholars and native speakers. Efforts of language planners have been hampered by the significant dialectal divisions in Romani: the absence of standard phonology, in turn, makes the selection of a single written form problematic.

In an effort to overcome this, during the 1980s and 1990s Marcel Courthiade proposed a model for orthographic unification based on the adoption of a meta-phonological orthography, which "would allow dialectal variation to be accommodated at the phonological and morpho-phonological level". This system was presented to the International Romani Union in 1990, who adopted it as the organization's "official alphabet". This recognition by the International Romani Union allowed Courthiade's system to qualify for funding from the European Commission.

Despite being used in several publications, such as the grammar of Romani compiled by Gheorghe Sarău and the Polish publication Informaciaqo lil, the IRU standard has yet to find a broad base of support from Romani writers. One reason for the reluctance to adopt this standard, according to Canadian Rom Ronald Lee, is that the proposed orthography contains a number of specialised characters not regularly found on European keyboards, such as θ and ʒ.

Instead, the most common pattern among native speakers is for individual authors to use an orthography based on the writing system of the dominant contact language: thus Romanian in Romania, Hungarian in Hungary and so on. A currently observable trend, however, appears to be the adoption of a loosely English-oriented orthography, developed spontaneously by native speakers for use online and through email.

Descriptive linguistics has, however, a long and established tradition of transcription. Despite small differences between individual linguists in the representation of certain phonemes, most adhere to a system which Hancock terms Pan-Vlax.

== Latin script ==
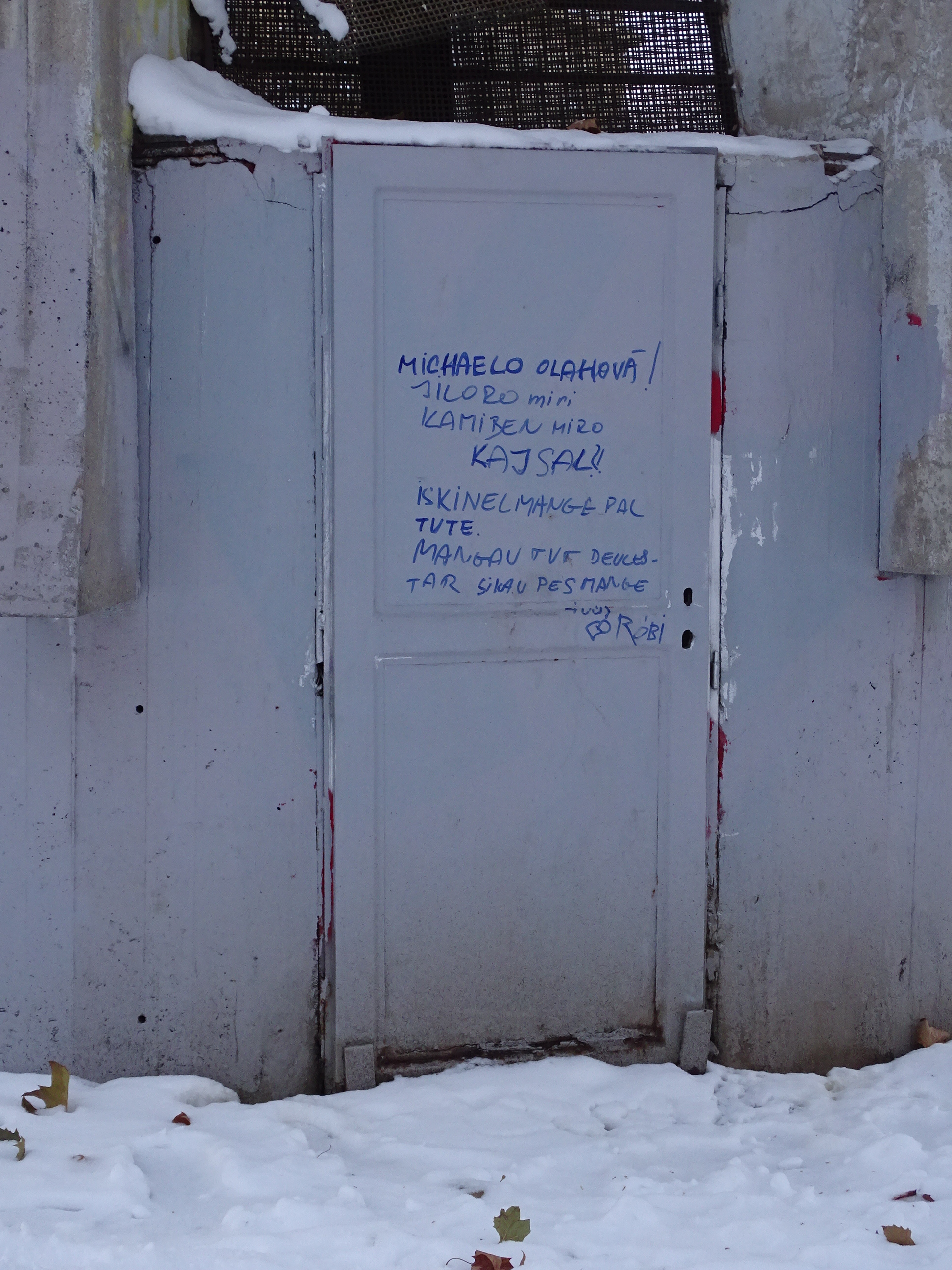
Romani graffito in New Town, Prague.

The overwhelming majority of academic and non-academic literature produced currently in Romani is written using a Latin-based orthography. There are three main systems that are likely to be encountered: the Pan-Vlax system, the International Standard and various Anglicised systems.

=== Pan-Vlax ===
In most recent descriptive literature, a variety of orthography which Ian Hancock terms Pan-Vlax will likely be used. This orthography is not a single standardised form, but rather a set of orthographical practices which exhibit a basic "core" of shared graphemes and a small amount of divergence in several areas. The Pan-Vlax script is based on the Latin script, augmented by the addition of several diacritics common to the languages of eastern Europe, such as the caron. Sometimes stress is indicated with an acute accent.

In the following table, the most common variants of the graphemes are shown. The phonemes used in the table are somewhat arbitrary and are not specifically based on any one dialect (for example, the phoneme denoted /d͡ʒ/ in the table can be realised as /ʒ/, /ʐ/ or /ɟ/, depending on dialect):

Romani "Pan-Vlax" alphabet
Grapheme	Phoneme	Example
A a	/a/	ambról pear
B b	/b/	barvaló rich
C c	/ts/	círdel he pulls
Č č	/t͡ʃ/	čačó true
Čh čh	/t͡ʃʰ/	čhavó boy
D d	/d/	drom road
Dž dž	/d͡ʒ/	džukél dog
E e	/e/	eftá seven
F f	/f/	fóro town
G g	/ɡ/	gadžó non-Rom
H h	/h/	herdelézi Saint George's Day
Ch ch	/x/	chal he eats
I i	/i/	iló heart
J j	/j/	jag fire
K k	/k/	kaj where
Kh kh	/kʰ/	kham sun
L l	/l/	lačhó good
M m	/m/	manúš man
N n	/n/	nasúl bad
O o	/o/	ochtó eight
P p	/p/	paramísi fairy tale
Ph ph	/pʰ/	phabáj apple
R r	/r/	raklí non-Romani girl
S s	/s/	somnakáj gold
Š š	/ʃ/	šukár beautiful
T t	/t/	tató hot
Th th	/tʰ/	them land
U u	/u/	umál field
V v	/ʋ/	vurdón cart
Z z	/z/	zor power
Ž ž	/ʒ/	žója Thursday

The use of the above graphemes is relatively stable and universal, taking into account dialectal mergers and so on. However, in certain areas there is somewhat more variation. A typically diverse area is in the representation of sounds not present in most varieties of Romani. For example, the centralised vowel phonemes of several varieties of Vlax and Xaladitka, when they are indicated separately from the non-centralised vowels, can be represented using ə, ъ or ă. Another particularly variant area is the representation of palatalised consonants, which are absent from a number of dialects. Some variant graphemes for /tʲ/ include tj, ty, ć, čj and t᾿. Finally, the representation of the second rhotic, which in several dialects has been merged with /r/, tends to vary between ř, rr, and rh, and sometimes even gh, with the first two being the most frequently found variants.

=== International Standard ===
The International Standard orthography, as devised by Marcel Courthiade and adopted by the International Romani Union, uses similar conventions to the Pan-Vlax system outlined above. Several of the differences are simply graphical, such as replacing carons with acute accents—transforming č š ž into ć ś ź—and acute accents with grave accents. However, its most distinctive feature is the use of "meta-notations", which are intended to cover cross-dialectal phonological variation, particularly in degrees of palatalisation; "morpho-graphs", which are used to represent the morphophonological alternation of case suffixes in different phonological environments; and a double dot (¨) to indicate a centralized vowel.

The "meta-notations" are ćh, ʒ, and the caron (ˇ; named ćiriklo after the word for bird), the realisation of which varies by dialect. The first two are respectively pronounced as /t͡ʃʰ/ and /d͡ʒ/ in the first stratum but /ɕ/ and /ʑ/ in the third stratum. The caron on a vowel represents palatalisation; ǒ and ǎ are pronounced /o/ and /a/ in Lovaricka, but /jo/ and /ja/ in Kalderash.

The three "morpho-graphs" are ç, q. and θ, which represent the initial phonemes of a number of case suffixes, which are realised /s/, /k/ and /t/ after a vowel and /ts/, /ɡ/ and /d/ after a nasal consonant.

=== Anglicised ===
The English-based orthography commonly used in North America is, to a degree, an accommodation of the Pan-Vlax orthography to English-language keyboards, replacing those graphemes with diacritics with digraphs, such as the substitution of ts ch sh zh for c č š ž. This particular orthography seems to have arisen spontaneously as Romani speakers have communicated using email, a medium in which graphemes outside the Latin-1 charset have until recently been difficult to type. In addition, it is this orthography which is recommended for use by Romani scholar and activist Ronald Lee.

=== Romani in North Macedonia ===
Romani in North Macedonia is written with the following alphabet:

A a	B b	C c	Ć ć	Č č	D d	Dž dž	E e
F f	G g	Gj gj	H h	I i	J j	K k	Kh kh
L l	Lj lj	M m	N n	Nj nj	O o	P p	Ph ph
R r	S s	Š š	T t	Th th	U u	V v	Y y
X x	Z z						

This alphabet is used in the educational system in North Macedonia for Romani-speaking students.

Kepeski & Jusuf (1980) noted that the following alphabet is used by Romani people in North Macedonia and Serbia (Kosovo):

A a	Ä ä	B b	C c	Č č	Kj kj (Ćć)	D d	Gj gj (Ǵǵ)
Dž dž	E e	F f	G g	H h	X x	I i	J j
K k	L l	Lj lj	M m	N n	Nj nj	O o	P p
Q q	R r	S s	Š š	T t	U u	V v	Z z
Ž ž

=== Finnish Romani ===
Finnish Romani (or Finnish Kalo) is written with the following alphabet:

A a	B b	(C c)	D d	E e	F f	G g	H h
Ȟ ȟ	I i	J j	K k	L l	M m	N n	O o
P p	(Q q)	R r	S s	Š š	T t	U u	V v
(W w)	(X x)	Y y	(Z z)	Ž ž	(Å å)	Ä ä	Ö ö

The letters in parentheses are only used in loanwords and are therefore not always part of the alphabet. The digraphs dž, kh, ph, th, and tš are used, but are not letters of the alphabet. Š and Ž are only used in these digraphs.

== Cyrillic script ==
Cyrillic alphabet of Kalderash dialect
Upper case	А	Б	В	Г	Ғ	Д	Е	Ё	Ж	З	И	Й	К	Кх	Л	М	Н	О	П	Пх	Р	Рр	С	Т	Тх	У	Ф	Х	Ц	Ч	Ш	Ы	Ь	Э	Ю	Я
Lower case	а	б	в	г	ғ	д	е	ё	ж	з	и	й	к	кх	л	м	н	о	п	пх	р	рр	с	т	тх	у	ф	х	ц	ч	ш	ы	ь	э	ю	я

Cyrillic alphabet of Ruska Roma dialect
Upper case	А	Б	В	Г	Ґ	Д	Е	Ё	Ж	З	И	Й	К	Л	М	Н	О	П	Р	С	Т	У	Ф	Х	Ц	Ч	Ш	Ы	Ь	Э	Ю	Я
Lower case	а	б	в	г	ґ	д	е	ё	ж	з	и	й	к	л	м	н	о	п	р	с	т	у	ф	х	ц	ч	ш	ы	ь	э	ю	я

== Greek script ==
In Greece, for instance, Romani is mostly written with the Greek alphabet (although very little seems to be written in Romani in Greece).

== Perso-Arabic script ==
The Perso-Arabic script has also been used, for example, in Iran. More importantly, the first periodical produced by Roma for Roma was printed in the Arabic script in the 1920s in Edirne in Turkey. It was called Laćo (لاچو), meaning 'good'.

== Comparison of alphabets ==
IPA	Latin									Cyrillic		
IPA	Hungarian		1971 Romani World Congress	American Romani	Pan-Vlax	Macedonian		International Romani Union Standard	Finnish Romani	?	Kalderash dialect	Ruska dialect
IPA	Lovari	Carpathian	1971 Romani World Congress	American Romani	Pan-Vlax	Official Teaching Alphabet	Folk Alphabet Kepeski & Jusuf (1980)	International Romani Union Standard	Finnish Romani	?	Kalderash dialect	Ruska dialect
[a]	A								—N/a	А, Я		
[ɑ]	—N/a								A	—N/a		
[æ]	—N/a								Ä	—N/a		
[b]	B									Б		
[ts]	C			Ts	C			C, Ç	—N/a	Ц		
[t͡ʃ]	Ch				Č			Ć	Tš	Ч		
[t͡ʃʰ]	—N/a	Chh	—N/a		Čh	—N/a		Ćh	—N/a	Чх	—N/a	
[d]	D							D, Θ	D	Д		
[dz]	Dz		—N/a									
[d͡ʒ]	Dzh		—N/a		Dž			Ʒ	Dž	Дж		–
[ɟ]	Dy			—N/a		Gj	Gj (Ǵǵ)	—N/a				
[e]	E									Э, Е		
[f]	F									Ф		
[ɡ]	G						G, Q		G	Г	Ғ	Ґ
[h]	H									Г	Г	
[x]	X			X			X	X	Ȟ	Х		
[i]	I									Ы, И		
[ɨ]	—N/a							Ï	—N/a	І	—N/a	
[j]	J		Y		J		J			Й		
[k]	K					K	K, Q		K	К		
[kʰ]	Kh						—N/a	Kh		Кх		—N/a
[l]	L									Л		
[ʎ]	Ly			—N/a		Lj		—N/a				
[m]	M									М		
[n]	N									Н		
[ɲ]	Ny			—N/a		Nj		—N/a				
[o]	O									О, Ё		
[ø]	—N/a							Ö	Ö	—N/a		
[p]	P									П		
[pʰ]	Ph						—N/a	Ph		Пх		—N/a
[r]	R									Р		
[ɽ],[ɻ],[rː],[ʀ]	—N/a				Ř, Rr, Rh, Gh	—N/a		Rr	—N/a		Рр	—N/a
[s]	S							S, Ç	S	С		
[ʃ]	Sh				Š			Ś	—N/a	Ш		
[ɕ]	—N/a				Ś	—N/a		Ćh	—N/a			
[t]	T							T, Θ	—N/a	Т		
[tʰ]	Th						—N/a	Th		Тх		—N/a
[c]	Ty			—N/a	Tj, Ty, Ć, Čj, T’	Ć	Kj (Ć)	—N/a				
[u]	U									У, Ю		
[y]	—N/a				Ü	—N/a		Ü	Y	—N/a		
[v]	V							—N/a		В		
[ʋ]	—N/a								V	—N/a		
[z]	Z								—N/a	З		
[ʒ]	Zh				Ž			Ź	—N/a	Ж		
[ʑ]	—N/a				Ź	—N/a		Ʒ	—N/a	Ӂ	—N/a	

== See also ==
- Writing system
- Romani language
