= Opre Roma Democratic People's Party =

Romani political party in Hungary

Opre Roma Democratic People's Party (Hungarian: Opre Roma Demokrata Néppárt) is a Romani Political Party in Hungary which aims to establish an Autonomous Romastan province comprising the Hungarian counties of Borsod County, Szabolcs–Szatmár–Bereg County, Nógrád County and Heves County by Referendum It was founded by István Kamarás as a Splinter from the Christian Democratic People's Party in 2011, the reason being that he no longer wanted to "lend his name to the government that oppresses Gypsies" however the Christian Democratic People's Party denies István was an advisor for them
