= Names of the Romani people =

The Romani people are known by a variety of names, mostly as Gypsies, Romani, Roma, Romanies, Tsinganoi, Bohémiens, with many variants. Numerous subgroups and clans self-designate, such as the Sinti, Kalderash, Boyash, Manouche, Lovari, Lăutari, Machvaya, Romanichal, Romanisael, Calé, Kale, Kaale, Xaladytka, Romungro, Ursari, and Sevlengere. In English, the word gypsy is most common.

In some regions, Roma is the primary term used in political contexts. Because all Romani use Romani as an adjective, Romani became an alternative noun. It is used by organizations such as the United Nations and the US Library of Congress. However, the World Roma Congress, the Council of Europe and other organizations prefer the term Roma, and recommend that Romani be used only as an adjective. The British government uses "Roma" as a sub-group of "White" in its ethnic classification system.

The English word Rom derives from Romani rom, meaning 'man, husband' (plural romá). Rom (with the plural Roma or Roms) and Romani (with the plural Romanies) are nouns and adjectives. Both Rom and Romani have been in use in English since the 19th century as an alternative for Gypsy. Romani is also spelled Romany, or Rommany. The terms Roma and Romanis are increasingly encountered as generic terms for the Romani people.

Rom's etymology is unclear. The Oxford English Dictionary says it likely derives from Sanskrit ḍomba, meaning 'lower-caste person working as a wandering musician', itself deriving from a Dravidian word, such as domba, ḍomba ('caste of acrobats, jugglers, clowns'). The standard assumption is that the demonyms of the Roma, Lom, and Dom, share the same origin.

Romani may serve as the feminine adjective and Romano as the masculine adjective. Some Romanies use Rom or Roma as an ethnic name, while others (such as the Sinti, or the Romanichal) do not.

Sometimes, Rom and Romani are spelled with a double r, i.e. Rrom and Rromani. In this case, Rr is used to represent the phoneme /ʀ/ (also written as ř and rh), which in some Romani dialects has remained distinct from the one written with a single r. The double r spelling is common in certain institutions (such as the INALCO Institute in Paris) or used in certain countries, e.g. Romania, to distinguish it from the endonym/homonym for Romanians (sg. român, pl. români).

In English, the exonym Gypsy (or Gipsy) is the most commonly used term. It originates from the Middle English gypcian, short for Egipcien. The Castilian term Gitano and the French Gitan have similar etymologies. They are ultimately derived from the Greek Aigyptioi (Αιγύπτιοι), meaning 'Egyptian', via Latin. This designation owes its existence to the belief, common in the Middle Ages, that the Roma, or some related group (such as the Indian Dom people), were itinerant Egyptians. Another designation is Cingane (alternatively Çingene, Tsinganoi, Zigar, Zigeuner, Tschingaren), likely deriving from the Persian word چنگانه (chingane), itself derived from the Turkic word çıgañ, meaning poor person. It is possible that the origin of this word is Athinganoi, the name of a Christian sect with whom the Roma (or some related group) could have become associated.

These exonyms may be written with a capital letter, to designate an ethnic group. While some Roma use the term, others consider it derogatory. (Note: Attributed to multiple sources:) The Council of Europe rejects the use of "Gypsy" and its variants, as well as administrative terms such as "Gens du Voyage". In Britain, many Roma proudly identify as "Gypsies", and, as part of the Gypsy/Roma/Traveller grouping, it is used to describe all para-Romani groups in official contexts. In North America, the word Gypsy is most commonly used as a reference to Romani ethnicity, though a nomadic lifestyle and fashion are also referenced using this word.

== Etymology ==
The demonyms of the Romani people, Lom and Dom share the same etymological origin, reflecting Sanskrit ḍoma "a man of low caste, living by singing and music."

The ultimate origin of the Sanskrit term ḍoma (perhaps from Munda or Dravidian) is uncertain. Its stem, ḍom, is connected with drumming, linked with the Sanskrit verbal root ḍam- 'to sound (as a drum)', perhaps a loan from Dravidian, e.g. Kannada ḍamāra 'a pair of kettle-drums', and Telugu ṭamaṭama 'a drum, tomtom'.

== Gypsy and gipsy ==
The English term gypsy or gipsy is commonly used to indicate Romani people, and use of the word gipsy in modern-day English is pervasive (and is a legal term under English law—see below), and some Romani organizations use it in their own organizational names, particularly in the United Kingdom. In the UK, the word Gypsy forms part of the Gypsy, Roma and Traveller designation, to represent Romani people from groups who have resided in the UK since the 16th century, as opposed to Roma, who are understood to be linked to more recent migrations.

The word, while sometimes positively embraced by Romani persons, is sometimes rejected by other Romani persons and considered a racial slur with a pejorative connotation implying illegality and irregularity, and some modern dictionaries either recommend avoiding use of the word gypsy entirely or give it a negative or warning label.

A British House of Commons Committee parliamentary inquiry, as described in their report "Tackling inequalities faced by Gypsy, Roma and Traveller communities" (published 2019), stated about their findings in the United Kingdom that: "We asked many members of the Gypsy, Roma and Traveller communities how they preferred to describe themselves. While some find the term "Gypsy" to be offensive, many stakeholders and witnesses were proud to associate themselves with this term and so we have decided that it is right and proper to use it, where appropriate, throughout the report."

The Oxford English Dictionary states a 'gipsy' is a

member of a wandering race (by themselves called Romany), of Indian origin, which first appeared in England about the beginning of the 16th c.

The first usage of the word in English found by the OED was 1514, with several more usages in the same century, and both Edmund Spenser and William Shakespeare used this word.

This exonym is sometimes written with a capital letter, to show that it designates an ethnic group. The Spanish term gitano, the French term gitan and the Basque term ijito have the same origin.

During the 16th and 17th centuries, the name was written in various ways: Egipcian, Egypcian, 'gypcian. The word gipsy/gypsy comes from the spellings which had lost the initial capital E, and that is one reason that it is often spelled with the initial g in lowercase. As time elapsed, the notion of "the gipsy/gypsy" altered to include other associated stereotypes such as nomadism and exoticism. John Matthews in The World Atlas of Divination refer to gypsies as "Wise Women". Colloquially, gipsy/gypsy is used refer to any person perceived by the speaker as fitting the gypsy stereotypes.

=== Use in English law ===
The term gipsy has had several overlapping meanings under English Law. In the Caravan Sites and Control of Development Act 1960, gipsies (not capitalised) were defined as "persons of nomadic habit of life, whatever their race or origin, but does not include members of an organised group of travelling showmen, or persons engaged in travelling circuses, travelling together as such". This particular definition included non-Romani groups as Irish Travellers. However, it is commonly understood that the term is etymologically an exonym. It originates from Egyptian (a historical name for Romani people in Britain).

Romani "gipsies" have been a recognised ethnic group for the purposes of Race Relations Act 1976 since Commission for Racial Equality v Dutton 1989, as have Irish Travellers in England and Wales since O'Leary v Allied Domecq 2000 (having already gained recognition in Northern Ireland in 1997).

== List of names ==
=== Gypsy/Gipsy ===
In several languages and historical cultures, Romani people were thought to come from Egypt.

- Basque: ijito
- English: gypsy/gipsy
- Spanish: gitano

In Crimean Tatar and Nogai they were called in a derogatory way as "Pharaoh" (Crimean Tatar: fraun, frauni; Nogai: praun).

=== Tsinganoi ===
In much of continental Europe, they are known by names related to the Greek term τσιγγάνοι (tsinganoi), from Byzantine Greek ἀθίγγανος (athínganos), which combines ἀ- (a-, "not") + θιγγάνω (thingánō, "touch"); compare to untouchable.

- Slavic
  - Belarusian: цыгане
  - Bulgarian: цигани, tsigani (Roma people)
  - Czech: cikáni (synonym: Romové)
  - Macedonian: цигани, tsigani (synonym: ѓупци)
  - Polish: Cyganie (synonym: Romowie)
  - Russian: цыгане, tsygane
  - Serbo-Croatian: цигани, cigani
  - Slovak: cigáni
  - Slovene: cigani
  - Ukrainian: цигани, tsyhany
- Germanic
  - Afrikaans: sigeuner (after Dutch)
  - Danish: sigøjnere
  - Dutch: zigeuner
  - German: Zigeuner
  - Icelandic: sígaunar
  - Norwegian:
    - Bokmål: sigøynere
    - Nynorsk: sigøynarar
  - Swedish: zigenare
- Romance
  - French: tsiganes, tziganes
  - Galician: ciganos (those from East and
    Central Europe), cíngaros (those from Italy)
  - Italian: zingari, zigani
  - Portuguese: ciganos, zíngaros
  - Romanian: țigani
  - Sicilian: zìngari, zanni
  - Spanish: cíngaros
- Other Indo-European
  - Albanian: Cigan
  - Armenian: գնչու, gnčʿu
  - Balkan Romani: Čingaren
  - Caló (Spanish Romani): čingarár
  - Esperanto: Cigano
  - Hindi: चिंगारी Chingaari
  - Latvian: čigāni
  - Lithuanian: Čigonai
  - Persian: کولی, Koli
- Turkic
  - Crimean Tatar: Çingene
  - Nogai: Şingene
  - Turkish: Çingene (dialect: Çingan or Cingan, use of “Roman” is also widespread)
- Uralic
  - Hungarian: cigány; use of "roma" is also widespread and supported. Some, but not all, Roma consider cigány to be offensive. The word cigány can also be used to mean Roma culture in a neutral manner, rather than Romani people (cigányzene); this meaning is embraced by most Hungarian Roma.

The name originates with Byzantine Greek ἀτσίγγανοι (atsinganoi, Latin adsincani) or ἀθίγγανοι (athinganoi, literally "untouchables"), a term applied to the sect of the Melchisedechians. The Adsincani appear in an 11th-century text preserved in Mt Athos, The Life of Saint George the Athonite (written in the Georgian language), as "a Samaritan people, descendants of Simon the Magician, named Adsincani, who were renowned sorcerers and villains". In the text, emperor Constantine Monomachos employs the Adsincani to exterminate wild animals, who were destroying the game in the imperial park of Philopation.

An intriguing Sogdian occurrence of the adjective tājīgāne (arguably to be pronounced as tāžīgāne) in a Manichaean hymnal from Turfan of about the year 1000, may supply the missing link between Middle Persian tāzīg ‘Arab’ and Turkic/New Persian tāzik, tāžik ‘Persian’. The word resonates with Saʿdi’s later tājikāna cited above, with prior Sogdian attestations in documents from Mt. Mugh of the early eighth century (tāzīkānak, and its base tāzīk, both meaning indisputably ‘Arab’), and with slightly later occurrences of tāžīgāne, which “may still have meant ‘Arab’ or ‘Moslem’ in a more general sense,” since a “Persian general” (pārsīk) is mentioned in the same context (Sundermann, pp. 167-68). Problems with the Sogdian reflex of that vexatious middle consonant lead Sundermann to revise Schaeder’s interpretation and argue for a Parthian origin of Sogdian ž in this case (idem, p. 169: pointing out [p. 171] that the Ṭayyiʾ were established as allies of the Parthian Arsacid dynasty before they served the Sasanians). He argues finally that the tāžīg referred to here are Iranians, distinguished from the Sogdians as being speakers of New Persian (tāžīk, ‘the Muslim language’ for Sogdians—which Persians at that time called dari—as distinct from parsīk, which is Middle Persian), but that they are of course fellow Manichaeans, not Muslims. The Muslim Turks who were soon to rule the region (some of whose kinsmen were Manichaeans, too) thus took their designation of the local Persian population from the Sogdians. This definition of Tājik, if correct, would correspond quite closely to the modern one, in which language and location are fundamental, and religion is incidental. However, it would realign the modern Tajik view of the Sogdians as their ancestors, casting them rather as ‘the Other’ who bestowed the ethnonym Tājik in its definitive sense.

=== Bohémiens ===
Because many Roma living in France had come via Bohemia, they were referred to as Bohémiens. This term would later be adapted by the French to refer to a particular artistic and impoverished lifestyle of an individual, known as Bohemianism.

- Basque: buhame (in the Northern dialects)

=== Roma ===
- Czech: Romové (synonym)
- Polish: Romowie (synonym)
- Basque: erromintxela or txingartu (for Basque-speaking Romanies)
- Chinese: 罗姆人 Luōmǔrén
- Coptic language: ⲣⲱⲙⲁ Roma
- Japanese: ロマ Roma

=== Other ===
- Albanian: Arixhi (handler of bears)
- Arabic: غجر ghájar
- Azerbaijani: Qaraçı
- Estonian: mustlased (from the word "must" meaning dark(-skinned), black or dirty, and "-lane" denoting belonging to a group)
- Finnish: mustalaiset (from "musta" and "-lainen" analogously to Estonian above)
- Georgian: ბოშები bošebi
- Hebrew: צוענים tsoʿănim (from the city Soan in Egypt)
- Kurdish قەرەچی, qaraçı (from Turkish); دۆم, dom
- Mingrelian: ჩაჩანეფი çaçanephi
- Spanish: calé

In the English-speaking world, Romani people are commonly known as Gypsies, Romani Gypsies, Romany Gypsies, Romani and Romanies.

The Romani of England are commonly known as Gypsies or Romani, or Romanichal in Angloromani. The Romani of Scandinavia are commonly known as Romer or Tater, or Romanisael in Scandoromani. In German-speaking Europe, the self-designation is Sinti, in France Manush, while the groups of Spain, Wales, and Finland use Calé, Kalé and Kaale (from kalo meaning "black" in Romani language). Following the first World Romani Congress in London, usage of the Romani terms Rom (singular) and Roma (plural), have become increasingly widespread in Central and Eastern Europe.

While many Romani people feel compelled to hide their identity in fear of persecution, some people of Romani heritage do not consider themselves to be Romani.

In Bulgaria, a number of people of Romani heritage identify as Turks or Bulgarians and some identify as Romanians.

== See also ==
- Dom people
- List of Romani people
- Lom people
- Lyuli
- Origin of the Romani people
- Romani people by country
- Zott
