= Ionel Rotaru =

Romani activist

Ionel Rotaru (1918-1982) was a Romani activist. Born in Bessarabia, now Moldova, he survived World War II and settled in France. Rotaru contributed significantly to the advocacy for his people, famously crowning himself as Vaida Voevod III, claiming to be the supreme leader of the Romani people. His founding of the Communauté Mondiale Gitane, the first international Romani organization, furthered his efforts to advocate for Romani rights and education. Despite challenges, including legal issues over specially issued passports for Roma, his efforts eventually led to the establishment of the International Romani Union and popularized the bicolor Romani flag.

== Early life ==
Ionel Rotaru was born in Bessarabia, now located in modern-day Moldova, in 1918. He had a middle-class upbringing living with his parents, three brothers, and two sisters. His family was literate; his father was an engineer, while two of his brothers held jobs as an architect and a journalist.

During World War II, he was a conscript in the Romanian Army before fleeing west in 1946 as the only surviving member of his family, the rest of them executed by the Nazis. He escaped to Italy, then Egypt, before settling in France in 1947. It is unclear whether he entered the country illegally. Before reaching Paris, he struggled to maintain a job, bouncing between various occupations and cities. He worked as a sailor in Marseille, a miner in Lens, and once in Paris, he was a porter in the Les Halles market for an unspecified period. At some point, e married his wife and moved into a one-bedroom apartment on 75 Rue Victor Hugo. During his time in France, he experienced moderate amounts of success in his artistic career, which continued even as he advocated for the Romani people.

== Romani activism ==
=== Supreme Leader of the Gypsies ===
In May 1959, several French newspapers reported sensational news that the Roma had crowned their supreme leader with the exotic title of Vaida Voevod III in Enghien-les-Bains, a small town north of Paris. Ionel Rotaru, now self-proclaimed as Vaida Voevod III, staged this coronation, with engaging photographs distributed to the press. These images depicted Rotaru and the former Voevod participating in a symbolic transfer of title, mingling their blood from their wrists. The Declaration of the Rights of Man played a significant role in the event, as well as symbolism associated with the colors blue (for the sky) and green (for hope) on his sash. The theatrical nature of the ceremony intrigued Romani intellectuals in Paris who considered themselves ‘the real Bohemians’.

Rotaru already had a support base among the Roma immigrants in Paris from Romania and other countries before this event. He had initially assisted the immigrants with issues of immigration, and was becoming increasingly involved in helping individuals with reparation claims against West Germany. The Romani intellectuals of Paris joined forces with him in support of this cause. Rotaru received significant assistance from two half-brothers, Jacques and Louis Dauvergne, who had mixed French and Rudari Roma backgrounds and adopted the political names Vanko and Léulea Rouda. Vanko, a paralegal, was granted substantial time by his law firm to work on Roma cases pro bono. Together, they established two organizations: the Organisation Nationale Gitane and the Communauté Mondiale Gitane (CMG).

=== Communauté Mondiale Gitane ===
Throughout his activism, Ionel Rotaru created various associations with the intent of supporting the Romani people. The Communauté Mondiale Gitane (CMG), also known as the World Community of Gypsies in English, is the most notable and successful –and the first international Romani organization. Through this organization, Rotaru established a transnational network through CMG to advocate for Romani rights. This network extended beyond the Iron Curtain to Poland, where the first office was established. Rotaru also reached out to other countries in the West to form more offices, including the UK, Ireland, Canada, Germany, and Austria. In these countries, he sought to address the concerns of various marginalized groups stigmatized by their nomadic lifestyles. One of the ways in which Rotaru succeeded was by convincing the French Ministry of Education to fund a temporary special education program for Romani children in the Paris slums.

Most of the CMG's activities were conducted in Rotaru’s home in Montreuil, Paris, where he received journalists and constituents, drafted statements and speeches, and engaged in advocacy efforts. Some of Rotaru’s work involved developing proposals for the French government, which began to put him at odds against them. The French government was particularly disturbed by two demands: firstly, the call for institutional support to address the literacy needs of the Romani people, acknowledging their educational marginalization; and secondly, the push for international recognition of their cultural assets, from music to language, which are now considered endangered treasures following extensive historical persecution.

The French government abruptly shut down the CMG on February 26, 1965, citing non-compliance with regulations on foreign membership. In response, Vanko Rouda, the former co-founder of CMG, established a new group consisting of members with French citizenship. This group, later named the Comité International Tzigane (CIT) starting in 1967, carried on the advocacy for Romani rights and recognition. By the time it was shut down, the CMG had established 45 international delegations worldwide.

=== Passport Trial ===
Despite the dissolution of the Communauté Mondiale Gitan, Rotaru continued his activities in other countries. His activities escalated into a legal issue in 1971 when two Polish Romani women were arrested in Vannes, Brittany. Upon their detention, police demanded their passports. The documents that were procured appeared similar to official passports but replaced "République Française" with "Déclaration des droits de l’Homme". Although these cards allowed Roma to cross borders, their legality was dubious. Soon after the women’s arrest, an individual claiming to be the king of the Gypsies and president of the CMG appeared at the detention site to check on his subjects and clarify the nature of the passports. He asserted that the documents were issued to members of an Order of Romani Templars, over which he presided. The incident led to Rotaru's arrest. After his own arrest, he initiated a hunger strike and was subsequently hospitalized first in Vannes and then in Rennes.

== Legacy ==
=== International Romani Union ===
Ionel Rotaru's founding of the Communauté Mondiale Gitane led to the eventual creation of the International Romani Union. After most of the CMG's work was taken over by the Comité International Tzigane (CIT), the CIT was eventually renamed and became the International Romani Union.

=== Romani Flag ===
Flag of the Romani people

Ionel Rotaru played a significant role in the adoption and revival of the bicolor flag as a symbol of Romani identity and leadership. The bicolor flag, featuring green and blue stripes, appeared in Rotaru's sash when he asserted his leadership of the Romani people. By 1961, he openly declared the bicolor flag as the Flag of the Romani people.
