= Žarko Jovanović =

Žarko Jovanović Жарко Јовановић
- Born: 26 December 1925; Batajnica, Belgrade, Kingdom of Serbs, Croats and Slovenes
- Origin: Belgrade, Serbia
- Died: 24 March 1985 (aged 59) Paris, France
- Genre: Romani music
- Occupations: Musician, composer
- Instrument: Balalaika
- Years active: 1949–1985

Žarko Jovanović (Serbian Cyrillic: Жарко Јовановић, 26 December 1925 – 26 March 1985) was a Serbian Romani musician who is known for composing the Romani anthem Gelem, Gelem.

== Biography ==
Jovanović was born in Batajnica, suburb of Belgrade in 1925. During World War II he was imprisoned in three camps. After that he joined the Yugoslav Partisans. At the time of war, Jovanović lost most of his family. He moved to Paris on February 21, 1964. Jovanović was known as Romani activist. He participated on two Romani Congresses, one in 1971 near London and other in 1978 in Geneve. On the Second Roma Congress he was named Romani Culture Minister. He was known in Paris for playing a balalaika, a Russian traditional instrument. Jovanović died in Paris in 1985.
