= Judith Okely =

British cultural anthropologist

Judith Melita Okely (1941-2025) was a British anthropologist best known for her ethnographic work with the traveller gypsies of England. She was an Emeritus Professor of Social Anthropology, University of Hull and Research Affiliate of the School of Anthropology, University of Oxford. Her research interests encompassed fieldwork practice, gypsies, feminism, autobiography, visualism, landscape representations, and the aged, mainly within Europe. The UK Data Service lists her as a "Pioneer of Social Research".

== Early life and education ==
Okely was born in Malta but grew up in Sussex and Lincolnshire. She attended boarding school from the age of nine at Upper Chine School for Girls on the Isle of Wight, but did not enjoy the experience, and later published work on the experience of girls in boarding schools.

She studied for two years at the Sorbonne in Paris and then enrolled at the University of Oxford, where she began a campaign for the Oxford Union to admit women to their debating society. Admitting women to the Oxford Union required a 2/3 vote of its past and current members. The first vote failed, with 903 men voting to admit women and 435 voting against. The second vote, on 9 February 1963, succeeded, 1,039 to 427. Okely then became the first woman admitted to the Oxford Union.

While at Oxford, Okely read PPE at St Hilda's College. She later took a Certificate in Social Anthropology at the University of Cambridge (1970).

An appointment with the Centre for Environmental Studies in 1970 led to her research work on gypsy-travellers, and to a DPhil from Oxford in 1977 and her 1983 book.

== Academic career ==
Okely was appointed as a lecturer at Durham University in 1976, moving to Essex in 1981, Edinburgh in 1990 and then becoming a professor at Hull in 1996. She retired from Hull in 2004, moving to become deputy director of the International Gender Studies Centre, Queen Elizabeth House, and Research Associate, School of Anthropology, University of Oxford.

Her 1983 book The Traveller-Gypsies was based on extensive field work with traveller-gypsies in the 1970s and was described as "an important contribution to the scientific, as opposed to the romantic or antiquarian approach, to the study of British Travellers" and "... not simply a work of scholarship however. It invites the public to understand in matters where prejudice and hostility have ruled. It deserves a wide readership".

== Awards ==
In 2011, she was awarded the Seal of the City of Plzeň in the Czech Republic, and also received a medal from the Faculty of Philosophy at Plzeň's University of West Bohemia, as a 'World Scholar.' In 2020, she received the Rivers Memorial Medal from the Royal Anthropological Institute, an award that is given for "a recent body of work published over a period of five years which makes, as a whole, a significant contribution to social, physical or cultural anthropology or archaeology."

== Selected publications ==
- 1983 The Traveller-Gypsies, Cambridge, UK: Cambridge University Press.
- 1986 Simone de Beauvoir - A Re-reading. London: Virago Press. ISBN 0860683249
- With Callaway, H. (eds) 1992 Anthropology and Autobiography: Participatory Experience and Embodied Knowledge, London: Routledge.
- 1996 Own or Other Culture, London, Routledge.
- 2007 Identity and Networks :Fashioning Gender and Ethnicity across Cultures eds D. F. Bryeson, J.Okely and J.Webber Oxford : Berghahn
- 2008 Knowing How to Know (eds) N. Halstead, E. Hirsch and J.Okely Berghahn
- 2012 Anthropological Practice: fieldwork and the ethnographic method
