= International Romani Union =

Organization active for the rights of the Romani people

Romano Internacionalno Jekhetanipe International Romani Union
- Flag
- Anthem: Gelem, Gelem
- Location: Vienna
- Official language: Romani
- Type: Transnational Union

Leaders
  - President: Zoran Dimov
  - Vice presidents: Ajten Berlafa, Stefano Kuzhicov
  - Vice president for education: Punita G Singh
  - Vice president for finances: Vijendra Sharma
  - Head of parliament: Rosita Grönfors
  - Vice presidents of the parliament: Grazziano Halilovic, Radmila Nesic
  - Vice president of the IRU for the Russia, Australia, USA, Asia: Artur Kvik, Nijazi Taip, Anatoly Butakov, Veerandra Rishi
  - General secretary: Ramush Muarem
  - Treasurer: Veli Husein
  - High commissioner - IRU Youth - Roma ombudsman: Khurram Khan - Tashya Mathuin - Nina Rusokova
- Establishment: 1971
- Website iromaniunion.org/index.php/rm/

The International Romani Union (Romani: Romano Internacionalno Jekhetanipe), formerly known as the International Gypsy Committee and International Rom Committee, is an organization active for the rights of the Romani people. Its seat is in Vienna. The International Romani Union also has offices in Skopje, North Macedonia, and Washington, D.C., US.

The IRU was established at the second World Romani Congress in 1978. Its presidents have included Stanislav Stankiewicz, Emil Ščuka, and before him, Rajko Đurić, who held this office for many years. The current president of the IRU is Zoran Dimov, who was elected during the 10th congress which was held on 18–20 March 2016 in Skopje, Macedonia. It was attended by 100 delegates and members of the IRU from 40 countries. After that, a new leadership of the IRU parliament chaired by the past head of parliament Stevo Balogh from Austria was elected.

The IRU has a consultative ECOSOC status within the UN.

== History ==
In 1959, Ionel Rotaru founded the World Gypsy Community (CMG) in France. While members were mostly French, the organization made contacts in Poland, Canada, Turkey, and other countries. When the French government dissolved the CMG in 1965, a breakaway group formed the International Gypsy Committee (IGC) under the leadership of Vanko Rouda. When the 1971 World Romani Congress adopted the self-appellation of "Roma" rather than gypsy, the IGC was renamed the Komiteto Lumniako Romano (International Rom Committee or IRC), and Rouda was re-confirmed as president. The committee became a member of the Council of Europe the following year. The committee changed again at the 1978 World Romani Congress and took its present name. It was given consultative status at the United Nations Economic and Social Council the following year. The union became a registered NGO with UNICEF in 1986. In 1993, it was promoted to category II, special consultative status at the United Nations.

== Structure ==
The IRU consists of four bodies: congress, parliament, presidium, and court of justice.

== Institutional links ==
The IRU has institutional links with the Council of Europe, OSCE (ODHIR), UNHCHR, UNO and ERTF. The IRU has a memorandum of understanding with many other countries with a view to the "continuous improvement of the situation and living conditions of the Rom".

== See also ==
- International Romani Day
- Romani people
- Romani language
- Romani diaspora
- Flag of the Romani people
