= World Romani Congress =

International meetings for discussion of issues relating to Roma people

- Abbreviation: WRC
- Formation: 1971
- Founder: International Romani Union and allied activists
- Type: International non-governmental organization
- Legal status: Active
- Purpose: Representation of Romani people worldwide; promotion of rights, culture, and political recognition
- Headquarters: Varies (congresses held in different countries)
- Region served: Worldwide
- Members: Representatives of Romani communities and organizations
- Official languages: Romani, English, others
- Parent organization: International Romani Union
- Website: https://worldromacongress.org/

Flag of the Roma people

The World Romani Congress (Romani: Mashkarthemutno Romano Kongreso) is a series of forums for discussion of issues relating to Romani people around the world. As of 2023, there have been eleven World Romani Congresses. Among the chief goals of these congresses have been the standardization of the Romani language, improvements in civil rights and education, preservation of the Roma culture, reparations from World War II, and international recognition of the Roma as a national minority of Indian native origin.

== First World Romani Congress ==
The first World Romani Congress was organized in 1971 in Orpington near London, England, United Kingdom, funded in part by the World Council of Churches and the Government of India. It was attended by 23 representatives from ten nations (Czechoslovakia, Finland, Norway, France, Great Britain, Germany, Hungary, Ireland, Spain and Yugoslavia) and observers from Belgium, Canada, India and the United States. Five sub-commissions were created to examine social affairs, education, war crimes, language, and culture. At the congress, the green and blue flag from the 1933 conference of the General Association of the Gypsies of Romania, embellished with the red, sixteen-spoked Dharmachakra, was reaffirmed as the national emblem of the Roma people, and the song "Gelem, Gelem" was adopted as the Roma anthem. Usage of the word "Roma" (rather than variants of "gypsy") was also accepted by a majority of attendees; as a result, the International Gypsy Committee (founded in 1965) was renamed the Komiteto Lumniako Romano (International Rom Committee).

== Second World Romani Congress ==
The second Congress in April 1978, was held in Geneva, Switzerland, and attended by 120 delegates from 26 countries. Attendees helped transform the International Rom Committee into the International Romani Union.

== Third World Romani Congress ==
The third Congress was held in Göttingen, West Germany, in May 1981, with 600 delegates and observers from 28 countries. Attendees supported the call for Roma to be recognized as a national minority of Indian origin. The Porajmos was a major topic of discussion.

== Fourth World Romani Congress ==
In 1990, the fourth Congress was held in Serock, Poland, with 250 delegates attending. Discussion topics included World War II reparations, education, culture, public relations, language, and a Romani language encyclopedia. The International Day of the Roma was also officially declared as April 8, in honour of the first World Romani Congress meeting in 1971.

== Fifth World Romani Congress ==
The fifth World Romani Congress was held in Prague, Czech Republic in July 2000. Emil Ščuka was elected president of the International Romani Union. The Congress produced the official Declaration of the Romani non-territorial nation.

== Sixth World Romani Congress ==
The sixth Congress was held in Lanciano, Italy, on October 8 and 9, 2004, with participation from over 200 delegates from 39 countries. Delegates chose a new president for the International Romani Union (Stanisław Stankiewicz of Poland) and a new president of the World Parliament of the IRU (Dragan Jevremovic of Austria). A new committee was set up to examine issues surrounding women, families and children.

== Seventh World Romani Congress ==
The seventh Congress was held in Zagreb, Croatia, in October 2008. Almost 300 delegates from 28 countries attended the meeting, which released The Roma Nation Building Action Plan, a document which outlined plans for the development of Romani nationalism and representation. Esma Redžepova performed the Romani anthem.

== Eighth World Romani Congress ==
The eighth Congress was held in Sibiu, Romania, in April 2013. Approximately 250 delegates from 34 countries attended the meeting.

== Ninth World Romani Congress ==
The ninth Congress was held in Riga, Latvia, in August 2015. Approximately 250 delegates from 25 countries were in attendance. 21 countries out of the 25 in attendance formed a Federation to tackle the issues afflicting the Romani people.

== Tenth World Romani Congress ==
The tenth Congress was held in Skopje, North Macedonia, in March 2016.

== Eleventh World Romani Congress ==
The eleventh Congress was held in Berlin, Germany, on 15–17 May 2023.
