= Feudum Acinganorum =

14th to 19th century feudal estate

The Feudum Acinganorum was a fiefdom established around 1360 in Corfu, which mainly used Romani serfs and to which the Romanies on the island were subservient.
