= European Alliance of Cities and Regions for Roma Inclusion =

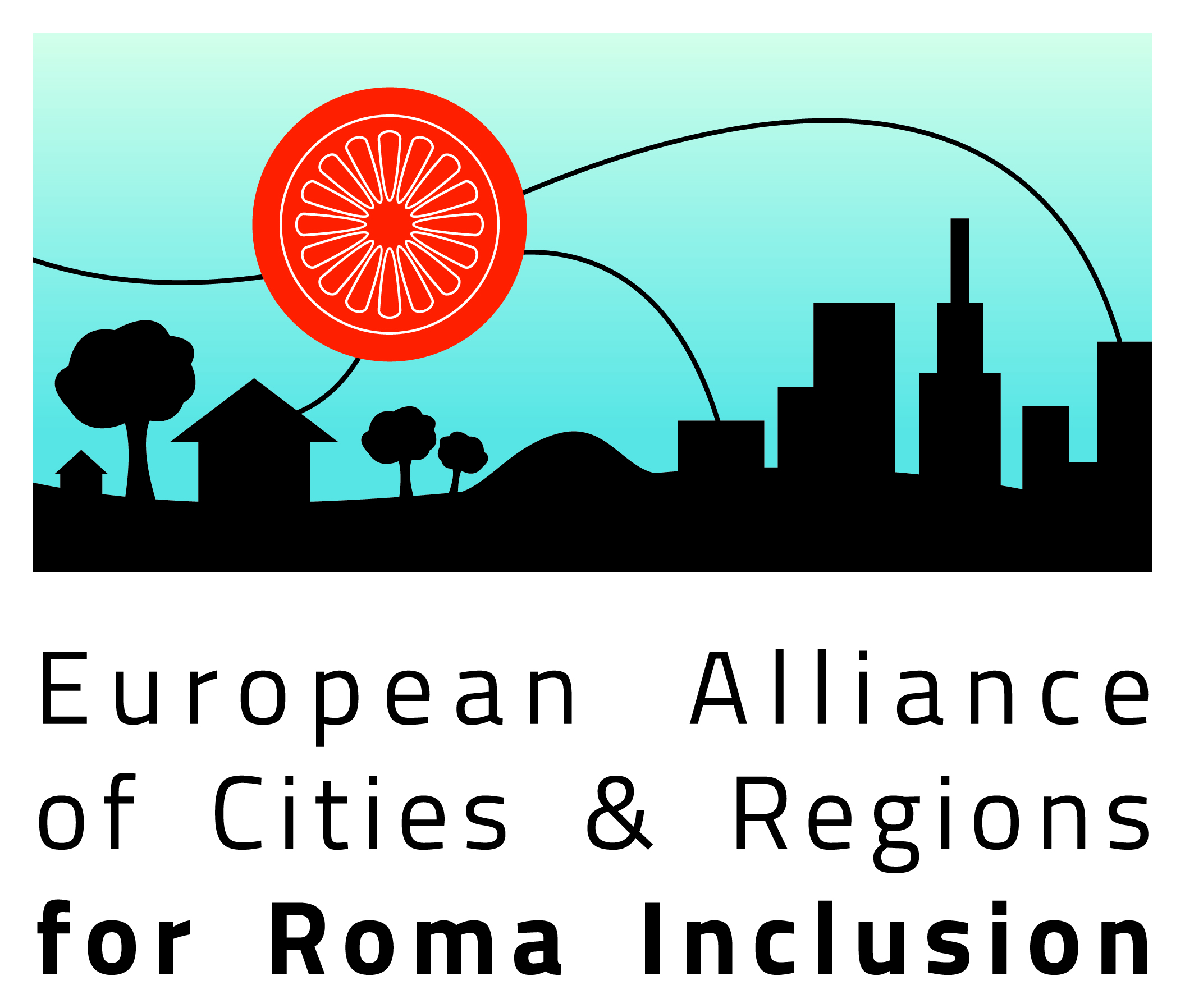
- Logo of the European Alliance of Cities and Regions for Roma Inclusion
- Formation: March 2013
- Type: Initiative of the Congress of Local and Regional Authorities of the Council of Europe
- Headquarters: (France) Strasbourg
- Members: 130 participant
- Official language: English, French
- Website: http://www.roma-alliance.org/

The European Alliance of Cities and Regions for Roma Inclusion is an initiative from the Congress of Local and Regional Authorities of the Council of Europe. The Alliance currently gathers 130 Cities and Regional authorities from 29 countries.

== Purpose ==
The main purpose of the European Alliance of Cities and Regions for Roma Inclusion is – through its participating cities and regions, in coordination with the respective national governments and while taking into account the specificities of each country – to favour projects and policies for Roma inclusion at local and regional level. In this regard, a strategic guideline for 2014–2020 has been approved by the Congress Bureau in Strasbourg on 8 September 2014.

== History ==
In recent years, there has been a strong development of European and national policy frameworks for the inclusion of Roma. Since policy measures at local and regional level are decisive for bringing about real improvement in the social inclusion of Roma, the Congress of Local and Regional Authorities of the Council of Europe decided to create a knowledge sharing platform to effectively combat anti-gypsyism in its domain, based on the Strasbourg Declaration on Roma adopted by the Council of Europe's Committee of Ministers in 2010.

The concept of the Alliance was identified at the Summit of Mayors on Roma in September 2011. It was followed by the creation of a core group of cities and regions which volunteered to establish the Alliance and drew up a general framework of its objectives and working methods. After a thorough consultation process in 2012, which included a large-scale survey, conducted with local and regional authorities in Council of Europe member states and follow-up consultation meetings, the main needs and interests of the cities and regions were identified. The Alliance was officially launched during the 24th Session of the Congress on 20 March 2013.

== Alliance participants ==
The participants of the Alliance are local and regional authorities in Council of Europe member states which are committed to promote Roma inclusion and support the Alliance. Full participation in the Alliance is carried out on the basis of specific criteria, including:

- a clear commitment to overcome existing problems regarding the situation of Roma (e.g. a declared policy commitment);
- demonstrated previous activities/efforts in favour of Roma inclusion or activities currently in process of implementation;
- Existing mechanisms for dialogue and cooperation with local Roma communities.

See the full list of participants here.

== Strategic Guidelines (2014/2020) ==
A strategy for 2014 to 2020 has been adopted by the Congress Bureau in Strasbourg on 8 September 2014. This document sets the pathway for the future developments of the Alliance up to 2020 and is considered as the key concept paper for the Alliance Taskforce, which is responsible for drafting and implementing Alliance activities. This document notably describes the main objectives, the foreseen activities, the expected mid-terms outcomes of the Alliance but also its structure and functioning.

== Objectives ==
In line with the Strasbourg Declaration on Roma Inclusion, the main objectives of the Alliance are the following:

- To assist the development of initiatives that favour the exchange of know-how and experience on Roma inclusion between the cities and regions, which participate in the Alliance;
- To enable the participating cities and regions to speak with a common voice against social exclusion of Roma and anti-Gypsyism, by providing a platform for lobbying on the issues concerning Roma inclusion at local level;
- To improve dialogue between local authorities, Roma communities, NGOs and civic participation in local government decision-making;
- To draw up particular attention to the role of Roma women and Roma youth and advocate Roma culture and history, in particular the commemoration of the Pharrajimos (genocide of Roma), including its International Remembrance Day (2 August).

== Activities ==
The Alliance activities are oriented toward four main lines of action:

=== Fostering political will ===
Participants of the Alliance are encouraged to promote Roma inclusion through projects and policies at local and regional level. The Alliance thus eases the sharing of good practices, raises awareness for the positive effects of successful Roma inclusion and also uses the large network of the Congress of Local and Regional Authorities of the Council of Europe.

=== Offering a forum for exchange ===
In order to promote mutual learning, the Alliance organises various types of meetings to discuss issues of Roma inclusion, participants’ needs and expectations. These meetings can take the form of national and international conferences or workshops and thematic roundtables on specific topics of Roma inclusion such as housing, education, health, employment.

The Alliance also makes strong use of the Internet and its tools. An intranet platform has been implemented for all Alliance participants with information about cities and regions participating in the network and their projects and policies on Roma inclusion. The Alliance thus encourages and supports exchange among participants in order to facilitate peer-to-peer exchange, partnerships and joint initiatives, also in the context of transfrontier cooperation.

=== Increasing the visibility of activities on Roma inclusion of cities and regions participating in the Alliance ===
Since 2007, in order to fight anti-gypsyism, the Congress organizes the Dosta! Prize for municipalities, which is part of the Dosta!-Campaign. This prize is awarded biannually to three municipalities for their successful and innovative projects in the field of Roma inclusion.

=== Promoting the involvement of civil society ===
The Alliance notably encourages regular consultations with Roma and non-Roma NGOs on local and regional government affairs, Roma policies and community needs. It also invites cities and regions participating in the Alliance to pursue participatory approach enabling Roma to have a say when it comes to inclusion policies and projects.

== Other areas of interest ==
=== Roma Youth ===
The European Alliance of Cities and Regions for Roma Inclusion aims to be a lever for local and regional authorities to engage in the exchange of best practices for Roma Youth inclusion. Young Roma have to suffer from a doubled plight: they are concerned by the same discriminations and difficulties as their elders, but at the same time they have to endure the same problems as all young people today (unemployment, social and economic exclusion, difficult transition to adulthood, and an uncertain future).

In this regard, the Congress of Local and Regional Authorities adopted a report on "Empowering Roma youth through participation: effective policy design at local and regional levels" on 26 March 2014 during the 26th Congress Session. This report was prepared by co-rapporteurs Inger Linge and John Warmisham, Congress Vice-President and Rapporteur on Roma Issues. It states that "the role of inter-governmental organizations should be first and foremost to support and assist the efforts carried out at national, regional and especially local level". The presentation of the report was followed by a debate and a vote on the draft resolution and the draft recommendation. The report underlines in particular that the Alliance "can be instrumental in promoting empowerment of young Roma at local and regional levels" and invites "local and regional authorities to join the European Alliance of Cities and Regions for Roma Inclusion".

=== Roma Women ===
The Alliance is also committed to awarding particular attention to the role of Roma women in promoting Roma inclusion at local and regional level. Indeed, as for young Roma, Roma women still should face double discrimination: they are marginalized from the society as Roma and marginalized from their community as women. The Alliance welcomed the launching at the 4th International Conference of Romani Women on 17–18 September 2013 of a platform initiative called Phenjalipe ("Sisterhood") with the aim to support the implementation of the Conference’s outcomes, called Strategy on the advancement of Romani women and girls in Europe, 2014-2020, and facilitate exchanges of information and coordination at regional level on issues related to Roma women and girls. This Strategy aims to be a policy tool which can be used by Roma women in their advocacy and policy work.

=== International Remembrance Day (2 August) ===
The European Alliance of Cities and Regions for Roma Inclusion of the Council of Europe strives for official recognition of 2 August as an international day of remembrance for the victims of the Porajmos (Roma genocide). The Alliance has been committed to advocate for this recognition since its starting, considering that anti-Gypsyism in its current form cannot be understood and combatted thoroughly without accepting the historical fact of the Roma Genocide.

In 2014, the Congress and the Alliance have sustained the initiative of the European Roma and Travellers Forum (ERTF) to have an official recognition of the commemoration day for the Roma Genocide by the Committee of Ministers of the Council of Europe. Unfortunately, this attempt failed due to a lack of consensus within the Committee.

Against this background, the Alliance of Cities and Regions for Roma Inclusion warmly welcomed the European Parliament vote on 15 April 2015 in favor of recognizing 2 August as the annual Roma Genocide Day with an overwhelming majority. This resolution went with a call for more effort to end discrimination, hate crime and hate speech against Roma, who are still the biggest and most discriminated minority in Europe.

=== Cooperation with the European Roma Travellers Forum (ERTF) ===
On the occasion of the 26th Congress Session on 26 March 2014, former Congress President Herwig van Staa and Rudko Kawczynski, former President of the European Roma and Travellers Forum (ERTF) officially signed a cooperation agreement between the ERTF and the Congress.

The ERTF is the first-ever representative forum representing Roma Communities throughout Europe which aims to express Roma concerns at the European level and defend the human rights of Roma. It has been created in July 2004, following the proposal of Ms. Tarja Halonen, President of Finland, in an address to the Parliamentary Assembly of the Council of Europe. This agreement signed in 2014 aimed at deepening cooperation between the Congress and the ERFT in pursuit of their common objective of Roma inclusion in European societies and their participation in public life and refers specifically to the work of the Alliance. It underlines in particular that "the European Alliance of Cities and Regions for Roma Inclusion will offer a framework for joint efforts, at operational level, to promote Roma inclusion policies at local and regional level". In scope with the cooperation agreement, "regular exchanges of information will also take place between the ERTF and the Alliance Taskforce, especially those dealing with concrete projects developed in the field by the Alliance, with a view to sharing expertise, planning possible joint activities and follow-up of their implementation."
