= Romani anthem =

Dželem, dželem
English: I Went, I Went
- Ethnic anthem of the Romani people
- Also known as: "Opre Roma!" (English: Upward, Roma!)
- Lyrics: Žarko Jovanović, 1949
- Music: Žarko Jovanović, 1949
- Adopted: 1971

The Romani anthem, often known by its incipit as "Dželem, dželem" (Note: Romani pronunciation: [ˈdʒelem ˈdʒelem]; lit. 'I Went, I Went') and also known as "Opre Roma!", (Note: lit. 'Upward, Roma!') is a traditional song composed by the Romani Serbian musician Žarko Jovanović. It is often used as the ethnic anthem of the Romani people. The title "Dželem, dželem" has been adapted in many countries by local Roma to match their native orthography and spoken dialect of the Romani language.

In an interview with reporter Mike Kalezić, Jovanović himself titled the song "Opre Roma".

== History ==
After experiencing firsthand the incarceration of Roma during the Porajmos (the Romani Holocaust of World War II) in the Independent State of Croatia, Jovanović later composed the lyrics of "Gelem, Gelem" and set them to a traditional melody in 1949. The song was first adopted by delegates of the first World Romani Congress held in 1971.

== Lyrics ==
In Europe, depending on the country of the settlers, the text can be written in several variations of the Romani alphabet. In other countries, Romani can be written in the Greek, Cyrillic, Arabic, Armenian, and Hebrew alphabets. Some orthographic conventions emerged over the centuries since then, but there is currently no single standard orthography used by both scholars and native speakers.

There are many variations to the lyrics, as the song has lyrics in the several regional dialects of Romani.

Anglo-Romani

Gelem, gelem, loongonay dromensa
Maladilem backtalay Romensa
A Romalay, catar toomen awen,
Ay tzarentza backtalay dromensa?

Ah, Romalen! Ah, Chawalen!

Sas wie man yeck barie familia,
Moodardas la ay Calie Legia
Awen mansa sa loomniacay Roma,
Ky pootardilay ay Romanay droma
Acay wriama, oostie Rom acana,
Amen cootasa misto Ky cayrasa

Ah, Romalen! Ah, Chawalen!

Pooter Dewla lay parnay woodara
Tay shy dickaw ky sie may manoosha
Palay ca jaw loongonay dromendar
Thy ca phiraw backtalay Romensa

Ah, Romalen! Ah, Chawalen!

Opray Roma, sie backt acana
Awen mansa sa loomniacay Roma
O calo mooey thy ay calay yacka
Camaw len sar ay calay dracka

Ah, Romalen! Ah, Chawalen!

English translation

I went, I went on long roads
I met happy Roma
O Roma, where do you come from,
With tents happy on the road?

O Roma, O Romani youths!

I once had a great family,
The Black Legion murdered them
Come with me, Roma from all the world
For the Roma, roads have opened
Now is the time, rise up Roma now,
We will rise high if we act

O Roma, O Romani youths!

Open, God, White doors
So I can see where are my people.
Come back to tour the roads
And walk with happy Roma

O Roma, O Romani youths!

Up, Romani people! Now is the time
Come with me, Roma from all the world
Dark face and dark eyes,
I want them like dark grapes

O Roma, O Romani youths!

== Alternate lyrics ==
There are many versions of "Gelem, Gelem", notably those translated by Ronald Lee.

In 2004, the band Vaya Con Dios released an interpretation, with lyrics in French by their singer Dani Klein, with the similar sounding title Je l'aime, Je l'aime (IPA: [ʒə lɛm | ʒə lɛm]).

== Sources ==
- Patrin Web Journal - Gelem, Gelem: Roma Anthem

== See also ==
- Romani nationalism
