= Freigraf =

Title of German nobility

Freigraf is a title of German nobility. It is derived from the German words frei ("free") and the feudal title graf ("count").
