= Athinganoi =

Manichaean sect

The Athinganoi (Ancient Greek: Ἀθίγγανοι, singular Athinganos, Ἀθίγγανος, Atsinganoi/Atzigani) were a Manichaean sect and practiced some of the Jewish customs (which can be regarded as a form of Judaizing) who lived in Phrygia and Lycaonia but were neither Hebrews nor gentiles. They kept the Sabbath but were not circumcised. They were shomer negiah.

Other sources indicate that the Athinganoi were associated with the Simonians and had no connection to the Manichaean or Paulician sects. They settled in Byzantium in 1054: the year of the East-West Schism. The Athinganoi married Byzantine women, adopted Greek Orthodox Christianity, and eventually assimilated into the Slavic and Greek populations. In some studies, the Athinganoi are described as remnants of the Indo-Greeks who left India in 400 AD during the Migration period.

== Name ==
The etymology of the word is not certain, but a common determination is a derivation in Greek for "(the) untouchables" derived from a privative alpha prefix and the verb thingano (θιγγάνειν, thinganein, "to touch"). The Manichean sect is mentioned in Soghdian sources.

=== Association with Roma ===
The name Athinganoi, a later variant form of which is Atsinganoi (ἀτσίγγανοι), came to be associated with the Roma who first appeared in the Byzantine Empire at the time. Atsinganoi is the root word for the ethnical (sometimes controversial) terms "cigano", "çingene", "cigány", "zigeuner", "tzigan", "țigan", and "zingaro", words used to describe members of the Roma in various European languages. Today many of these words are still used in a derogatory sense, albeit others are the most common exonym for them in a given language. The idea of Roma as sorcerers also plays a part in the apparent confusion between the Atzinganos (the Roma), and the Athinganoi.

The exact relationship between the Athinganoi and the Roma remains uncertain. Historians, such as Rochow, have suggested three different explanations for the association:

1. The name may have been transferred from the Christian sect to the Roma because both had gained a reputation for fortune telling or because the Roma were perceived to have adopted the religious practices of the sect.
2. The popular Greek name for the Roma, Tsinganoi, may have been original and unrelated to the Athinganoi, with the association of the two groups in Byzantine writings was due to ignorance and confusion between superficially similar names.
3. The name Athinganoi may have been given to any itinerant people who came from abroad and were perceived to practice a different religion, with the term only later applying more narrowly to the Roma.

== Purported doctrines according to Christian polemicists ==
An earlier and probably quite distinct sect with the same name is refuted by Marcus Eremita, who seems to have been a disciple of John Chrysostom.

They observed some of the Jewish customs but unlike in the Jewish faith, which explicitly bans magic, they observed some magical practices such as prophesizing and consulting seers. About AD 600, Timothy of Constantinople, Presbyter of Constantinople, in his book De receptione Haereticorum adds at the end of his list of heretics who need rebaptism the Mandopolini, "now called Athingani. They live in Phrygia, and are neither Hebrews nor Gentiles. They keep the Sabbath, but are not circumcised. They will not touch any man. If food is offered to them, they ask for it to be placed on the ground; then they come and take it. They give to others with the same precautions".

== See also ==
- Names of the Romani people
- Paulicians
- Euchites
- Bogomils
- Cathars
- Melchizedek (text)

== Bibliography ==
- Joshua Starr: An Eastern Christian Sect: The Athinganoi. In: Harvard Theological Review 29 (1936), 93–106.
- Ilse Rochow: Die Häresie der Athinganer im 8. und 9. Jahrhundert und die Frage ihres Fortlebens. In: Helga Köpstein, Friedhelm Winkelmann (eds.), Studien zum 8. und 9. Jahrhundert in Byzanz, Berlin 1983 (= Berliner Byzantinistische Arbeiten, 51), 163–178.
- Paul Speck: Die vermeintliche Häresie der Athinganoi. In: Jahrbuch der Österreichischen Byzantinistik 47 (1997), 37-50
