= Marcel Courthiade =

French linguist (1953–2021)

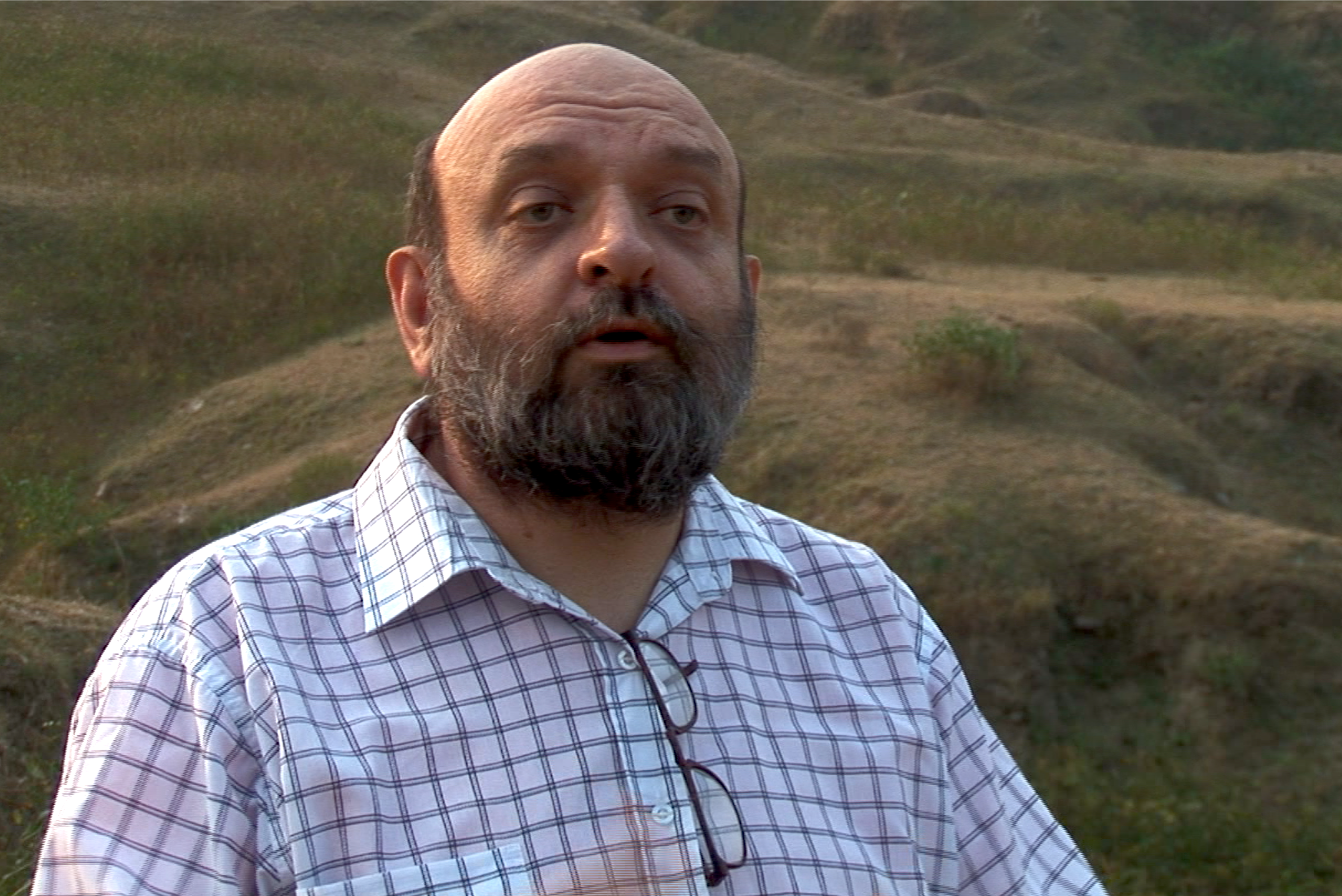
- Courthiade in 2008
- Born: 2 August 1953; Montceau-les-Mines, France
- Died: 4 March 2021 (aged 67); Tirana, Albania
- Occupations: Linguist; Researcher

Marcel Courthiade (French pronunciation: [kuʁtjad]; 2 August 1953 – 4 March 2021) was a French Romani linguist and researcher.

== Biography ==
Courthiade had originally studied medicine at the University of Clermont-Ferrand, but then shifted his focus on Slavic languages—particularly Serbo-Croatian and Polish. He then studied at the INALCO in Paris, where he earned a diploma in Polish, Macedonian, and Albanian. He titled his doctoral thesis Phonologie des variétés dialectales de Rromani et diasystèmes graphiques de la langue Romani, (Note: English: Phonology of Romani dialectal varieties and graphic diasystems of the Romani language) a degree he earned from the École pratique des hautes études.

During his studies, Courthiade worked for several NGOs regarding education for Romani people in Albania. Subsequently, he worked as a political analyst and interpreter at the French Embassy in Albania for four years. In 1997, he became a lecturer at INALCO. In 2008, he was a key participant of Louis Mochet's film Rromani Soul. In 2019, he became a member of the scientific council Délégué interministériel à la lutte contre le racisme, l'antisémitisme et la haine anti-LGBT. (Note: English: Interministerial Delegate for the Fight against Racism, Anti-Semitism and Anti-LGBT Hatred)

Marcel Courthiade died in Tirana on 4 March 2021 at the age of 67 from unknown causes.

== Publications ==
- Romani fonetika thaj Lekhipa (1986)
- Xàca dùme, but godi (1980s)
- Gramatika e gjuhës Rrome (1989)
- Stuart Manns Wörterbuch des albanischen Romanes (1990)
- In the margin of Romani. Gypsy languages in contact (1991)
- Dialektologikano pućhipnasqo lil vaś-i klasifikàcia e rromane ćhibǎqe [dia]lektenqiri (1992)
- Śirpustik. amare ćhibǎqiri (1992)
- Lil e Efesianěnqe. Epistoli pros Efesioys (1993)
- Terre d'asile, terre d'exil. l'Europe tsigane (1993)
- De l'usage de l'abécédaire « Śirpustik amare ćhibǎqiri » (1994)
- Langues de Diaspora (1994)
- Phonologie des parlers rrom et diasysteme graphique de la langue romani (1995)
- Structure dialectale de la langue rromani (1998)
- Les Rroms, Ashkalis et Gorans de Dardanie (Kosovo) (2000)
- Les Tziganes ou le destin sauvage des Roms de l'Est (2002)
- Appendix Two. Kannauʒ on the Ganges, cradle of the Rromani people (2004)
- Les Rroms dans les belles lettres européennes (2004)
- La Langue rromani, d'un millénaire à l'autre, Études Tsiganes (2005)
- Sagesse et humour du peuple rrom (2007)
- L'origine des Rroms. Cheminement d'une (re)découverte : Kannauj « berceau » du peuple rrom» (2007)
- La littérature des Rroms, Sintés et Kalés
