= Romanestan =

Proposed independent state for the Romani people

Flag of the Romani people, a national symbol of the Romani

Romanestan, Rromanestan or Romanistan is the name of a proposed country, for the Romani people.

The vast majority of Romani people live in Europe, and proposed locations for a Romani state are almost exclusively within the continent, particularly in the Balkans. The creation of an autonomous region for the Romani people was suggested by the leaders of a party in North Macedonia known as the Party for the Complete Emancipation of Roma (and also reportedly by a Romani party in Hungary) in the early 1990s, at Šuto Orizari. The proposal of such a region in North Macedonia was also briefly considered by Josip Tito, leader of Socialist Yugoslavia but the idea never materialized. Several times during the 1920s and 1930s, ideas of an autonomous Romani state within the USSR were raised. Such efforts were dropped by 1936–37.

Since the late 19th century, some Romani people have migrated from Europe to the Americas. In the early 1950s, Romani leaders petitioned the United Nations for the creation of their own state, but their petition was rejected.

Given the origin of the Romani people in the area of present-day India, Romanestan has also been envisaged as being within the borders of India.

== See also ==
- King of the Gypsies
- Romani in North Macedonia
