= List of Romani Americans =

This is a list of notable Romani Americans and Americans of Romani descent.

== List ==
- Béla Babai – musician
- Elek Bacsik – Hungarian-American jazz guitarist and violinist
- Gratiela Brancusi – Romanian-born American actress
- Raymond Buckland, Wiccan writer
- Darren E. Burrows – actor and director
- Charles Chaplin Jr. – actor
- Bill Clinton – former president of Scottish Gypsy descent
- Michael Costello – fashion designer who made dresses for various celebrities
- Billy Drago – actor
- Karen Finley – performance artist, musician and poet
- Caren Gussoff – author
- Ian Hancock – University of Texas linguist, scholar, and activist
- Amber L. Hollibaugh – writer, film-maker and political activist
- Tini Howard – comics writer
- Eugene Hütz – Ukrainian-born singer
- Johns family – subjects of the National Geographic Channel reality television series "American Gypsies"
- Priscilla Kelly – professional wrestler
- Ladislas Lazaro – politician
- Janet Lee – psychic who sued private investigator Bob Nygaard over alleged anti-Romani bias
- Oksana Marafioti – author of Armenian and Romani descent
- Richard Marcinko – commander and Vietnam War veteran
- Gina Marks – psychic and writer
- Jimmy Marks – victim of discrimination
- Rose Marks – psychic
- Jerry Mason – rock musician
- Seanan McGuire – author
- Paul Miller – better known as GypsyCrusader, far-right political commentator
- Kelly Mitchell
- Hillary Monahan – author
- Boris Pelekh – singer
- Sani Rifati – Kosovar-American human rights activist and the President of Voice of Roma
- Levi and Matilda Stanley – 19th century immigrant Romanichal elders
- Nettie Stanley – matriarch of the family starring in the TLC reality television series "Gypsy Sisters"
- Chrissy Teigen – model, television personality, author
- Tracey Ullman – actress
- Cecilia Woloch – poet
- Yul Brynner – Russian-born American actor who was an Honorary President of the second World Romani Congress, whose mother was a Romanian Roma

== See also ==
- Romani people
- List of Romani people
