= Romani people in the United States =

Romane manusha ande Amerika (Romani)
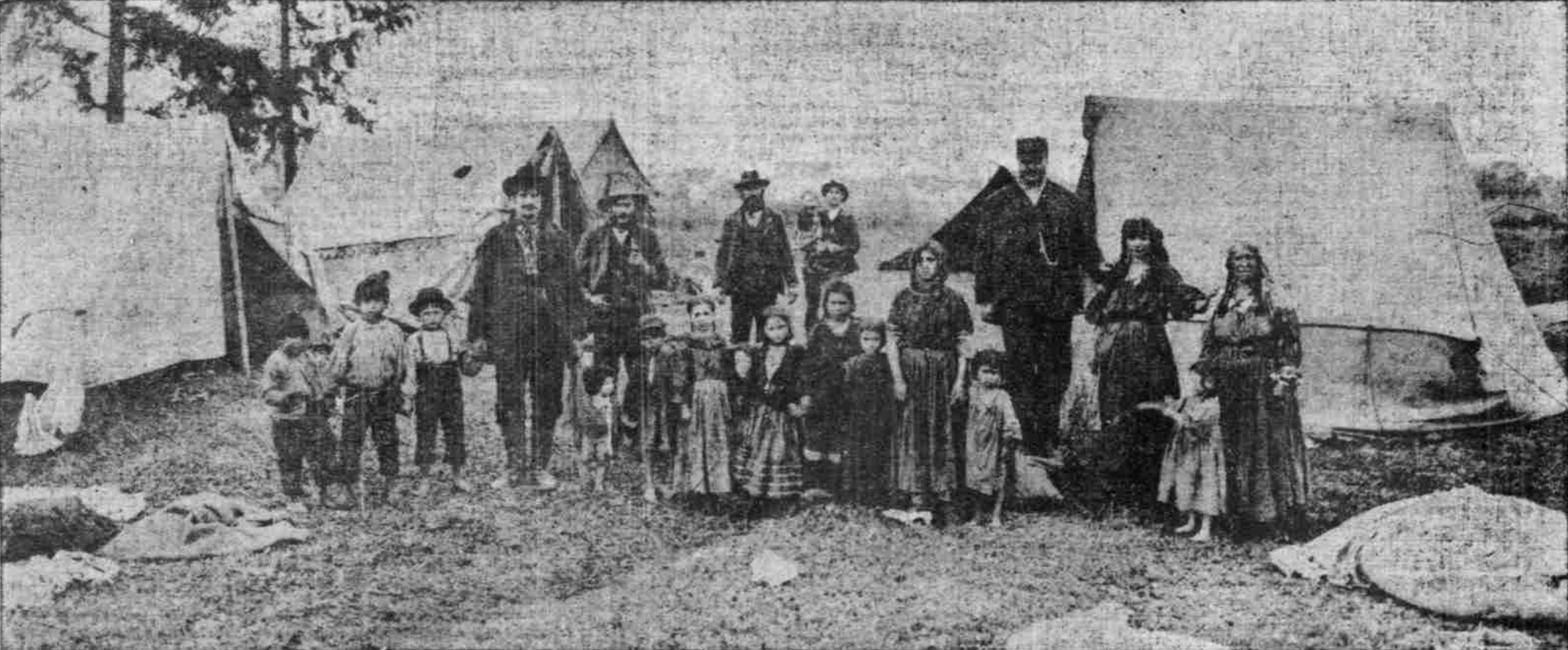
- An encampment of Roma people on the outskirts of Portland, Oregon, 1905

Total population
- est. 1,000,000

Regions with significant populations
- Los Angeles, San Francisco, New York City, Chicago, Boston, Atlanta, Dallas, Houston, Seattle, and Portland, as well as in rural areas in Texas and Arkansas

Languages
- American English, Spanish, Romani, Angloromani, Caló, Romanian, Bulgarian

Religion
- Christianity, Islam, Romani folklore

It is estimated that there are one million Romani people in the United States. Though the Romani population in the United States has largely assimilated into American society, the largest concentrations are in Southern California, the Pacific Northwest, Southwestern United States, Texas, Arkansas, Louisiana, Florida and the Northeast as well as in cities such as Chicago, Cleveland, and St. Louis.

The Romani, or Roma, are a nomadic ethnic group, often pejoratively referred to as Gypsies, who have been in the Americas since the first Romani people reportedly arrived on Christopher Columbus' third voyage in 1498. The largest wave of Romani immigrants came from the Balkans, Transylvania, Wallachia, and Moldavia region in the late 19th century following the abolition of slavery in Romania in 1864. Romani immigration to the United States has continued at a steady rate ever since, with an increase of Romani immigration occurring in the late 20th century following the Porajmos in Nazi Germany and its occupied European territories and then the collapse of communism in Central and Eastern Europe.

While there has been an increased consciousness of the existence of the Roma as an American people after the Cold War, the size of the Romani American population and the absence of a historical and cultural presence, such as the Romani have in Europe, make Americans largely unaware of the existence of the Romani as a people.

Most Romani Americans live in the United States's biggest cities, where the greatest economic opportunities exist. Romani Americans practice many different religions, usually based on the version of Christianity common in their country of origin, but fundamentalist Christian denominations have been growing in popularity among them.

The Roma live in populous cities such as New York City, Chicago, Cleveland, Los Angeles, San Francisco, Boston, Atlanta, Dallas, Houston, Seattle, Las Vegas, Miami, and Portland as well as in rural areas in Florida, Texas, Arkansas, etc.

The colonization of the United States by Spain, Britain, and France brought Romani immigration to the Americas. The Spanish conquistadors and colonizers introduced the Romani population to the Americas during the period of Spanish colonial expansion. Despite many Romani individuals arriving in the United States during European colonization and under the Spanish, Portuguese, French, and English empires, the history of Romani Americans is seldom discussed by researchers, and Romani Americans are largely underrepresented in American media. Additionally, Romani Americans tend to maintain a distance from non-Roma communities because of mistrust, leading to their isolation from mainstream American society. Their history in the U.S. is often described as “missing,” “lost,” or “forgotten” due to this underrepresentation and limited integration.

== History ==

The Romani population is believed to descend from individuals of low-caste Dalit musicians originating from the Dom caste community in Northern India. These individuals may have migrated to Europe as a means of escaping the hierarchical constraints of the Hindu caste system and the practice of Untouchability. Subsequently, Romani communities established themselves in the United States through the process of European colonial expansion.

=== Achievements ===
Romani Americans have served as experts on official delegations to meetings and conferences in the U.S. held by the Organization for Security and Cooperation in Europe (OSCE). At an OSCE Supplementary Human Dimension Meeting on Roma issues in November 2013, Nathan Mick, who is Romani American, delivered the U.S. delegation's intervention and participated in working sessions on improving respect for the rights of Romani people. Another American Roma Dr. Ethel Brooks served as a moderator at this same event; she also spoke at the UN Holocaust Commemoration in New York in 2013 in commemoration of the Romani genocide during World War II. In January 2016, former President Barack Obama named Dr. Ethel Brooks to serve on the Holocaust Memorial Council, making her the only Romani American on the council since President Bill Clinton appointed Ian Hancock in 1997. The State Department's public diplomacy programs have benefited from several Romani American speakers including Hancock who have, over the years, traveled to several European countries with support from US embassies in order to discuss Romani issues and human rights. The State Department's Bureau of Democracy, Human Rights, and Labor leads a regular meeting of a Romani working group, which gathers experts on Romani issues based in the Washington, D.C., including Romani Americans, to exchange information and discuss policy priorities for promoting Romani inclusion in Europe.

Voice of Roma was founded by Sani Rifati in 1996, and incorporated as a 501(c) 3 non-profit organization in 1999, in Sebastopol, California.

Schools for young Roma students have been set up in California, Washington, D.C., Philadelphia, Chicago, Seattle, and Camden, New Jersey.

Pennsylvania, Indiana, Georgia and New Jersey passed discriminatory laws that targeted Romani people.

=== Migration to the US ===
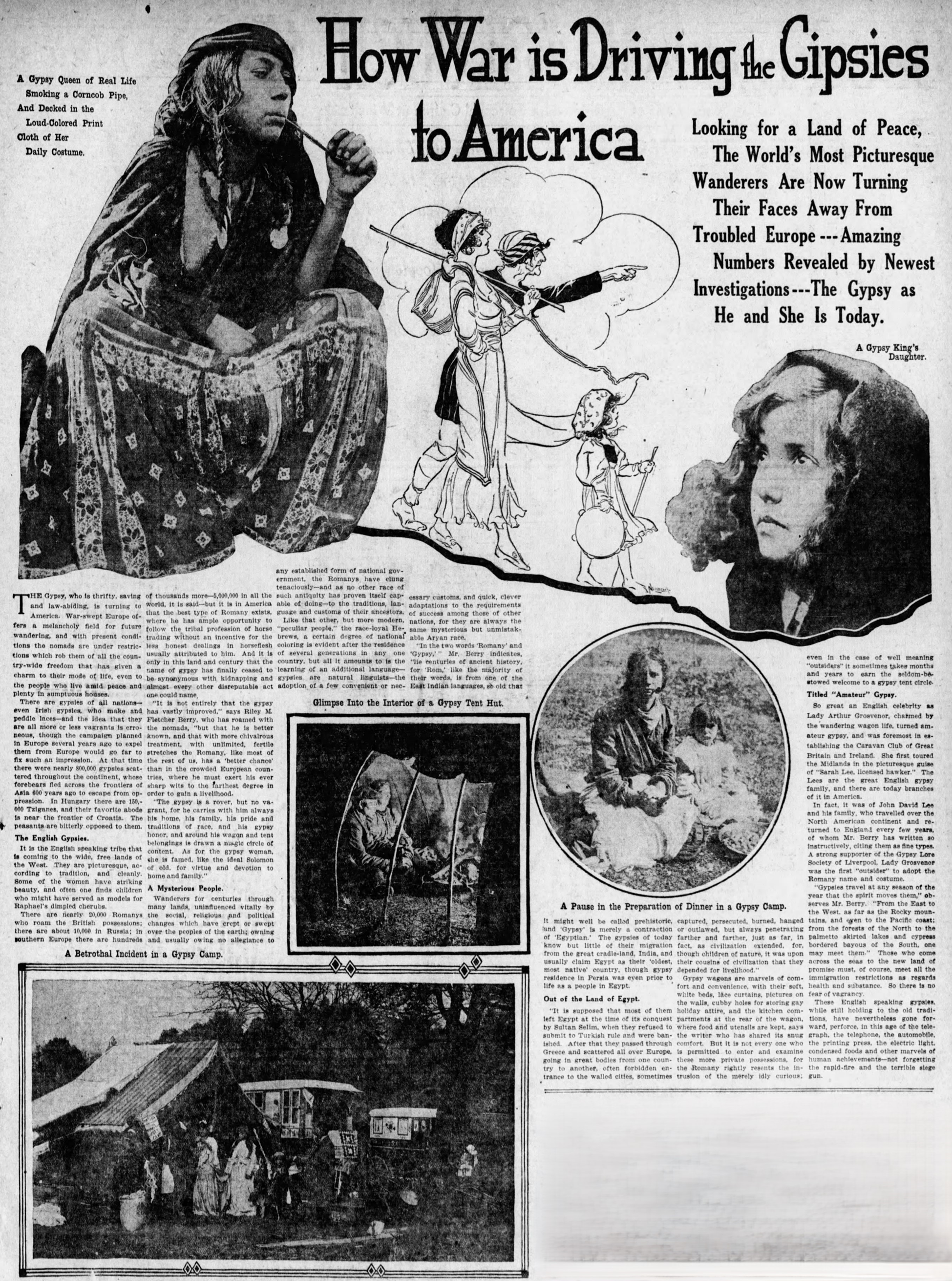
"How War is driving the Gipsies to America", article from newspaper, The Star Press, 1915

Romani slaves were first shipped to the Americas with Christopher Columbus in 1498. There was Romani presence in Hispaniola, now present day Haiti and the Dominican Republic. Gitanos from Spain were the first Romani subgroup sent to the Americas. The first Roma to come to the United States arrived in Virginia, Georgia, New Jersey and Louisiana during the 1500s. Spain sent Romani slaves to their Louisiana colony between 1762 and 1800. An Afro-Romani community exists in St. Martin Parish due to intermarriage of freed African American and Romani slaves. The first Roma to arrive in the United States came from the British Isles. Other Roma later came from the Mediterranean, along with the general shift of immigrants from northern to southern Europe. Among these were Roma, who moved out of Romania and Moldova in the nineteenth century. They travelled through Austria-Hungary, Italy and the Balkans, to arrive in New York in 1881. The Romanichal, the first Romani group to arrive in North America in large numbers, moved to America from Britain around 1850. The Rom were the second subgroup of Roma to immigrate to the United States. They came from Germany and other parts of western Europe. The third was the Ludar. They came from southern European ports beginning in 1882.

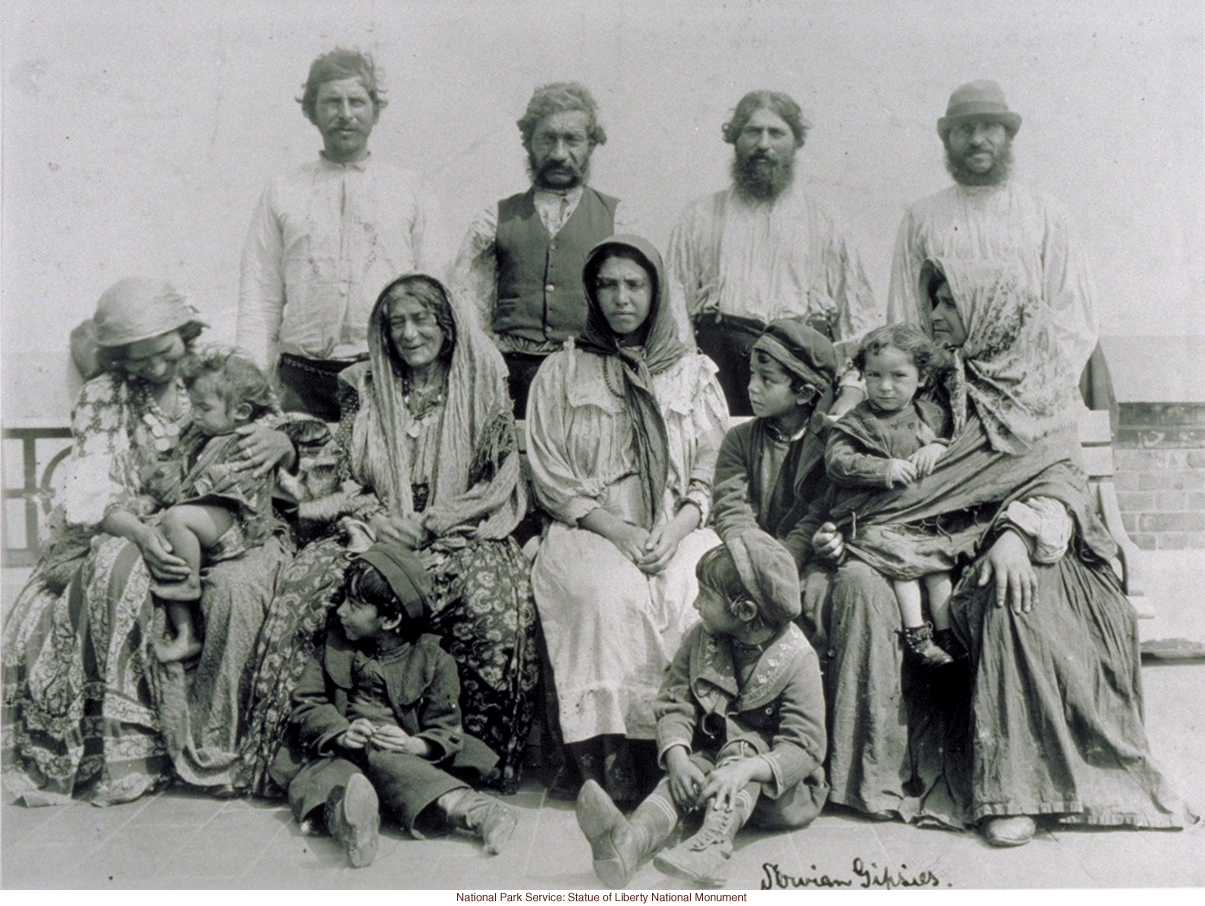

Iberian Gitanos and Balkan Romani, the ancestors of most of the Romani population in the United States today, began immigrating to the United States on a large scale over the latter half of the 19th century coinciding with the weakening grip of the Ottoman Empire and the Ottoman Wars in Europe in the 19th century, which ultimately culminated in the Russo-Turkish War (1877–1878), freeing many ethnic Eastern Europeans from Ottoman dominance and producing new waves of Romani immigrants. Other Roma mainly came from Greece and Italy. England and Scotland had shipped Romani slaves to Virginia. The Kalderash first arrived in the United States in the 1880s. Many of them came from Austria-Hungary, Russia, and Serbia, as well as from Italy, Greece, Romania, and Turkey. The arrival of the Kalderash, rudari and the other subgroups of Romani at this time more or less wiped out the Roma who had arrived in United States during the colonial period. Their arrival coincided with the large wave of immigration from Eastern Europe. Early Romani immigrants listed such diverse occupations as farmer, laborer, showman, animal trainer, horse trader, musician, and coppersmith, among others, to census takers. In the 19th century, Romani American men tended to pursue nomadic European occupations, while Romani American women often practiced fortune telling.

In the early periods of English and Scottish governance, authorities transported "vagabonds," "beggars," and "Gypsies" to American colonies such as Virginia, where they were compelled to work as indentured servants in tobacco plantations. Legislation concerning banishment targeted the Irish, Roma, and Africans following the 1590s; an Act under Mary stipulated that any Romani person who lingered in England for over a month could face execution by hanging; subsequently, an Act under Elisabeth broadened the capital offenses to encompass those who, through certain deceptive speech or behavior, presented themselves as Gypsies. In 1628, eight men were executed for violating these statutes, while their female counterparts were sent to Virginia. In 1636, another group of Gypsies was apprehended; the Romani men were hanged, and the Romani women were drowned in Haddington. Additionally, Romani had children with Native Americans, and intermarriage between the Roma and First Nations was relatively common. In 1836, Natchitoches Judge Henry A. Bullard, the inaugural president of the Louisiana Historical Society, noted: "In the Western District [of his jurisdiction], there exist some families of Gipsey descent, who continue to exhibit that distinctive complexion and wildness of eye, characteristic of that unique race." Cotton Mather documented the massacre of the residents of an English settlement in Amesbury and Newberry Falls, Massachusetts, in July 1677, when a shared cause fostered an alliance between Native Americans and Roma.

That wave of Romani immigration comprised Romani-speaking peoples like the Kalderash, Machvaya, Lovari, and Churari, and ethnically Romani groups that had integrated more within the Central and Eastern European societies, such as the Boyash (Ludari) of Romania and the Bashalde of Slovakia.

Many of the Vlach Romani headed for the United States took an indirect means of traveling to America; this involved traveling by ship to countries such as Mexico, or arrive at Canada to retry entry or cross the border. This was due to the fact that, at the time, U.S. legislation prevented entry to "Gypsies", making it problematic for those who were perceived to be easily identifiable as Romani by their appearance.

In 1999, the United States pledged to take up to 20,000 Kosovan refugees; many of them were Roma.

People who reported Roma ethnicity per 100,000 residents, by state, in the 2020 United States census. The census counted 16,258 people, far below published estimates of the total Romani population.

By the 2000s, there has been some acknowledgement of the growing presence of Romani peoples within America as the Census forms of 2000 were disseminated for the first time in Romani language, furthermore, as of 2010, five sessions in Congress have been held to address the growing increase of Romani asylum seekers to the US, due to the anti-Romani sentiment of Europe.

The new wave of Romani people such as the Romungre from Hungary and the Catani from Romania to be concentrated in New York and Chicago.

Many Romani people also came from Cuba, Canada, Mexico, or South America, from where it was easier to immigrate to the United States.

Early Romani immigrants reported a wide range of occupations to census officials, including farmer, laborer, showman, animal trainer, horse trader, musician, and coppersmith, among others. In the 19th century, Roma American men typically engaged in nomadic occupations common in Europe, while women frequently practiced fortune telling. As automobiles began to replace horses, men transitioned to roles in selling and repairing cars, as well as metalworking. Mobility has been a fundamental aspect of Roma culture; while some Roma Americans continue to travel or relocate as urban migrants in search of work, others exhibit a level of sedentism comparable to that of non-Romani Americans.

Between April and September 2023, the Roma National Center assisted 1,238 Romani people, among them 1,129 Ukrainian refugees from Ukraine due to the Russo-Ukrainian war.

== Discrimination ==
Many Romani Americans keep their identity a secret due to harmful stereotypes from the media that depict Roma as nomads, scammers, beggars and thieves. 70% of Romani Americans hide their Romani identity to avoid stigmatization. TLC's TV series My Big Fat American Gypsy Wedding has portrayed American Roma poorly and has oversexualized Romani American girls. Gypsy Sisters and National Geographic's American Gypsies also portrayed Romani Americans inaccurately.

Police departments in the United States have racially profiled and stereotyped Roma people as criminals and have set up task forces specialising in "Gypsy crimes", despite that this label is legally irrelevant. The Topeka State Journal and the Library of Congress have reported on Roma crimes and perpetrated stereotypes. In 2023, a sign was set up at a Chevron gas station in Rowland Heights, California that banned Romani women caused outrage amongst the local community, and the sign was described as racist.

In a Change in Social Standing polls in 1964 and 1989, Romani people were ranked as having the lowest social standing, along with Mexicans and Puerto Ricans. The results of a public opinion poll conducted over a 25-year period and published in the New York Times in 1992 indicated that Romani Americans were ranked last out of 58 different American ethnic and religious minorities. New Jersey had discriminatory laws against Roma.

Certain major cities in the United States, including New York City and Chicago, have designated police units specifically for the Romani population. In less populated areas, sheriffs frequently accompany Roma to the county border, relieved to see them depart. Ian Hancock references an edition of the Police Chief that features an article providing guidance to law enforcement on maintaining their jurisdictions devoid of Romani individuals. This type of racial profiling is similar to racism against African Americans and the anti-Mexican sentiment.

As reported by Harvard University, 14% of Romani survey respondents indicated that they experienced discrimination in their dealings with social services offices, while 57% of Romani individuals reported feeling discriminated against in restaurants, retail establishments, and other service interactions. When assessing discrimination over the past year, 34% of the Romani participants stated that they had encountered discrimination due to their Romani heritage.

Romani Americans encounter reduced levels of discrimination in comparison to their European counterparts, primarily attributable to the United States' pronounced ethnic diversity and their distinct visibility within the predominantly white population. Nevertheless, certain Romani-American individuals contend that discrimination remains a considerable challenge within the United States, particularly regarding employment opportunities and the negative perceptions linked to conventional Romani professions. These communities face persistent stereotyping that characterizes them as perpetrators of fraud, deception, and criminal activity. Romani Americans are subjected to racial profiling specifically concerning fraudulent fortune-telling operations and home repair fraud schemes. Romani Americans do face a certain degree of discrimination due to stereotypes that portray them as scammers, fraudsters, and con artists.

American singer Cher reinforced the Gypsy thief trope in the United States with her song "Gypsys, Tramps & Thieves". The massive American hit reached #1 on the American chart Billboard Hot 100 in 1971 and combines Romani people with "tramps" and "thieves," perpetuating the stereotype of the wandering, nomadic criminal Roma. The lyrics describe the existence of a travelling, wandering Romani household that will do "anything for money," including robbery.

Romani people are also often portrayed as evil nomadic criminals and revengeful, dangerous witches in the American movie industry who place curses on Gadje (non-Roma). The evil Gypsy witch trope appeared in American horror movies like Drag Me to Hell (2009) and the film adaptation of Stephen King's American novel Thinner (1996). In a episode of the American cartoon The Simpsons called Treehouse of Horror, the character Gypsy is portrayed as a evil, revengeful fortune teller who put a curse on Homer Simpson. American films reinforce dangerous anti-Romani stereotypes by associating Romani characters with gothic, untrustworthy, evil, witchcraft, magic and curses.

== Culture ==
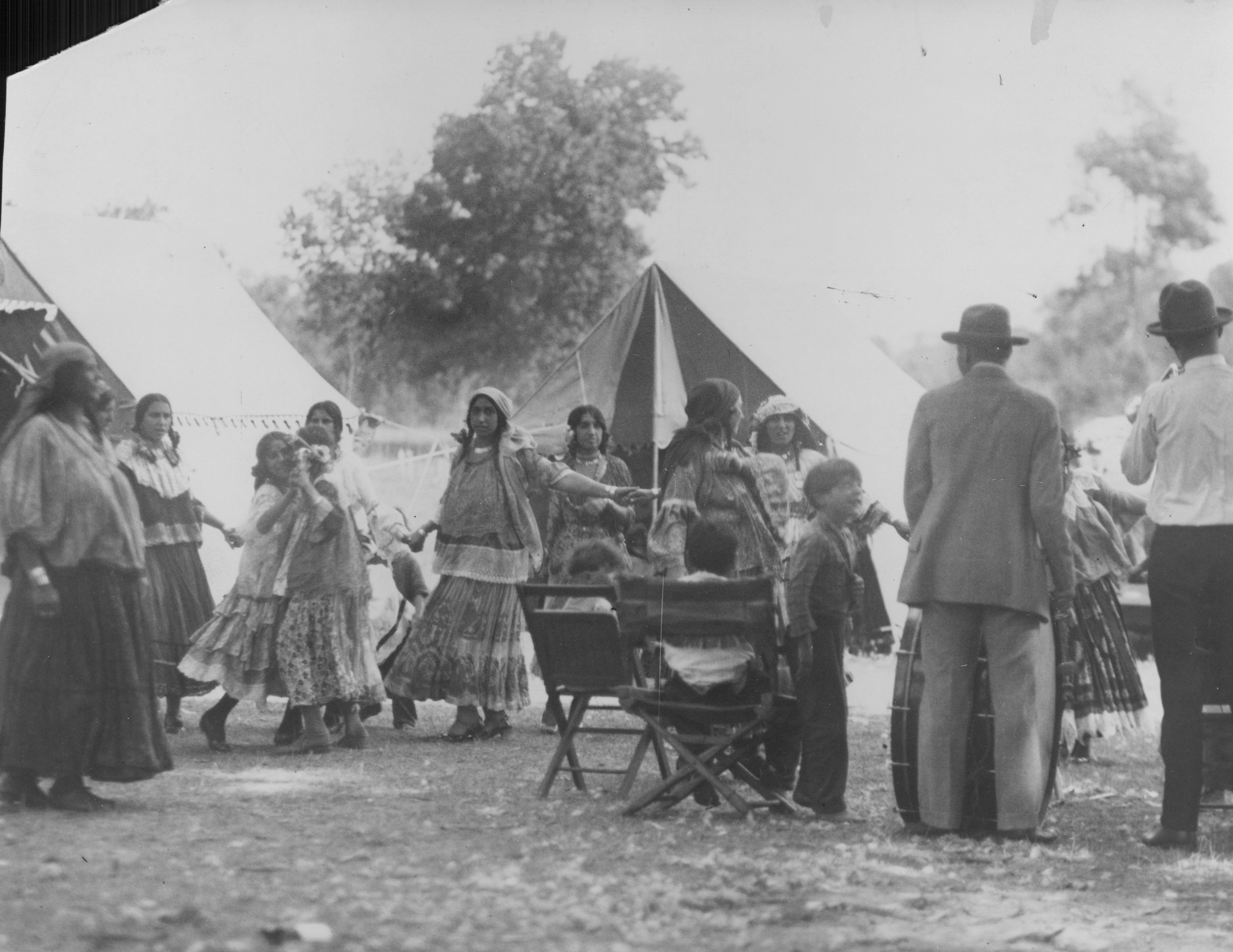
Romani wedding near Minnesota River.

Romani Americans eat sarma (stuffed cabbage), gushvada (cheese strudel), and a ritually sacrificed animal (often a lamb). There are several spicy Romani American soups. Fusui eski zumi is a Romani butter bean soup often made with ham. Pertia is a soup made with jellied pig's feet and pig's ears. Romani American stews are usually made with green and red peppers, tomatoes, potatoes, onions, garlic, and some meat. There are a variety of stews in Romani cuisine, like one Romani chicken paprikash called puyo. Whole meats, like spit-roasted pigs or lambs, are commonly prepared for Romani rituals in the United States. Large hams and lamb steaks bought wholesale and barbecued with a customary hot sauce called chile mole are also eaten at Romani feasts. The fat crust of ham is many Roma's favorite part of the meat. The Romani Americans have their own method of making coffee and tea. Romani coffee is often boiled with the groats and often dipped off the top with a spoon. At Romani feasts in the United States, sarmi, meats, hot sauces, celery sticks (often eaten by the Roma for virility), salads, pirogo, saviako, and a stew or two are usually served. Romani people only serve fruit on the table at pomana feasts. A dessert eaten for feasts and everyday use by American Roma is pirogo. Romani Americans prefer spicy foods and considered black pepper, red pepper, salt, vinegar, garlic and onions lucky foods.

Romani Americans do not marry according to American law.

Romani festivals in the United States are New York Gypsy Festival, the Midwest Gypsy Swing Fest, Herdeljezi Festival of Romani Music and Dance and the Charm City Django Jazz Fest.

At a festival in Portland

Romani Americans have large families and identify by their vitsa. Arranged marriages are popular among American Roma. The Kalderash in New York practice kinship.

Maintaining physical, ideological, and social distance from Gadje (non-Roma) has emerged as a crucial issue to preserve the integrity and continuity of Romani culture in the United States. American Roma are concerned about the potential corruption or disintegration of their culture due to increased interactions with gadje through educational institutions, healthcare facilities, and other public services, as well as the societal pressure to assimilate into host societies. Despite engaging with the gadzo world, skepticism and resentment persist within Romani communities, stemming from a history of hostility and pervasive stereotypes against the Roma. The resilience and vitality of Romani culture, characterized by a distinct separation between the external (gadzo) and internal (Roma) spheres, play a vital role in defining the Roma's ethnic identity, particularly in the multicultural context of the United States.

Romani Americans believe in the concept of marime. They cleanse their bodies using two different soaps and personal items separately. Maintaining a clean home is viewed as a sign of both moral and ritual purity. The Machwaya, who typically uphold a tidy and orderly household, often highlight this distinction in comparison to Kalderash housekeeping practices to demonstrate their moral and ritual superiority. A tidy home is believed to promote good health. Mamioro, the spirit associated with illness, is known to frequent unclean houses. Additionally, it is believed that one can contract diseases from the gaje by residing in their homes, necessitating thorough cleaning, particularly after gaje have recently occupied them. A residence that has been home to a series of Rom families is considered 'cleaner' regardless of the housekeeping standards upheld by those families.

== Gallery ==
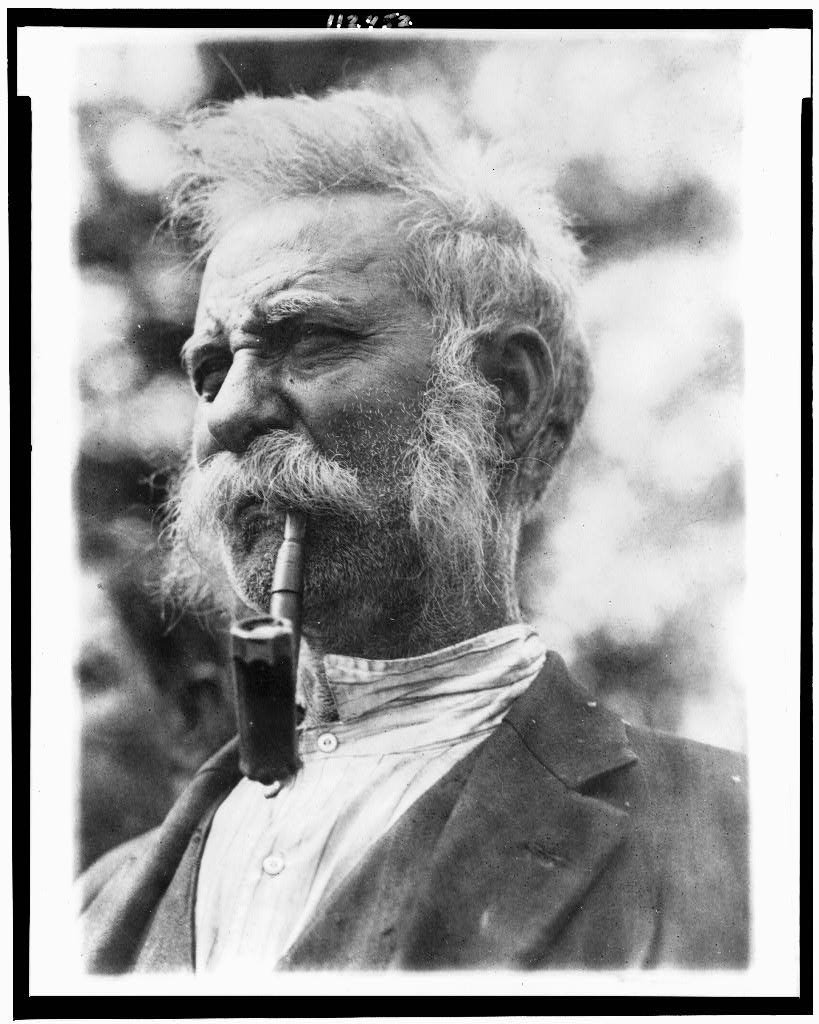

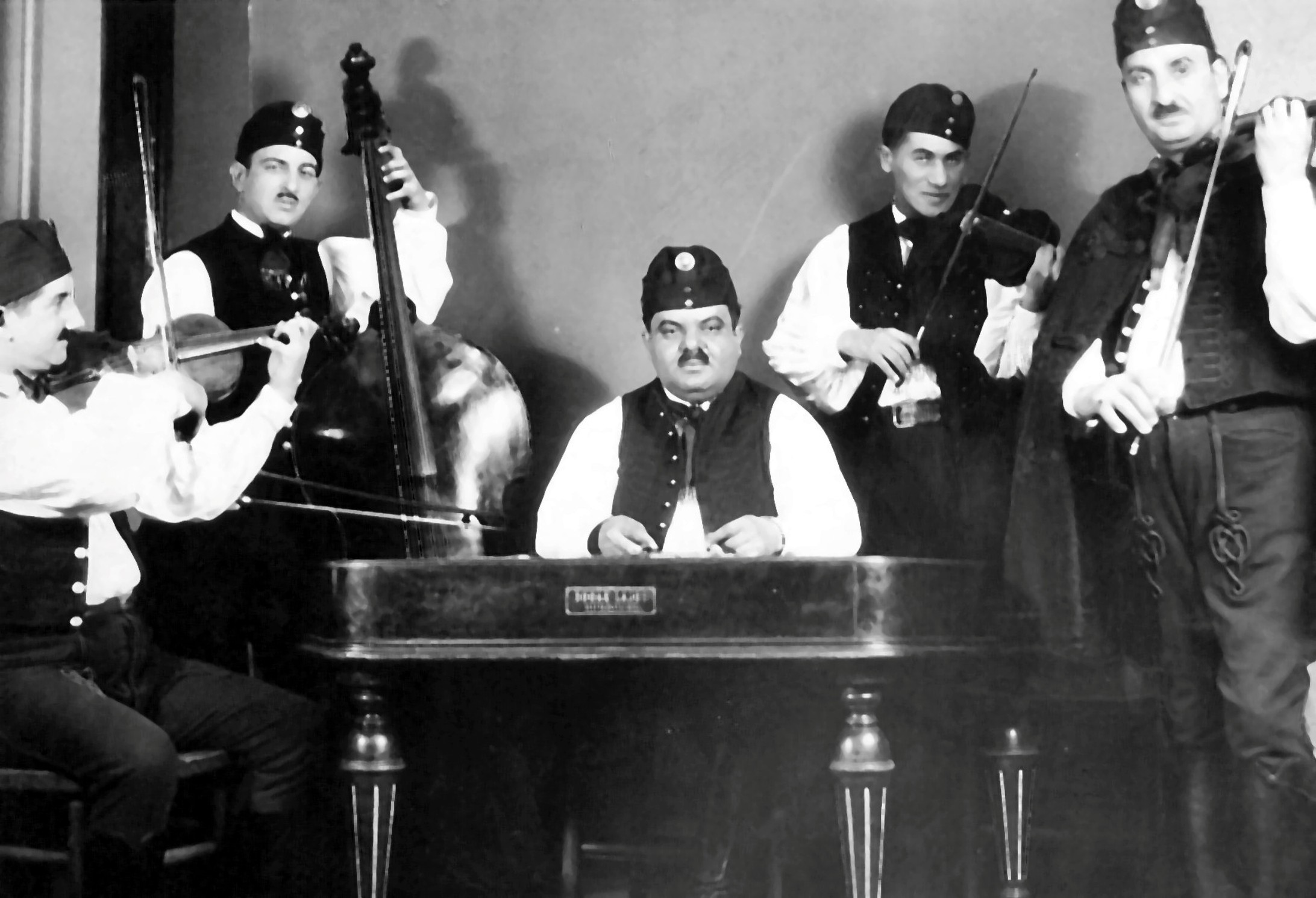

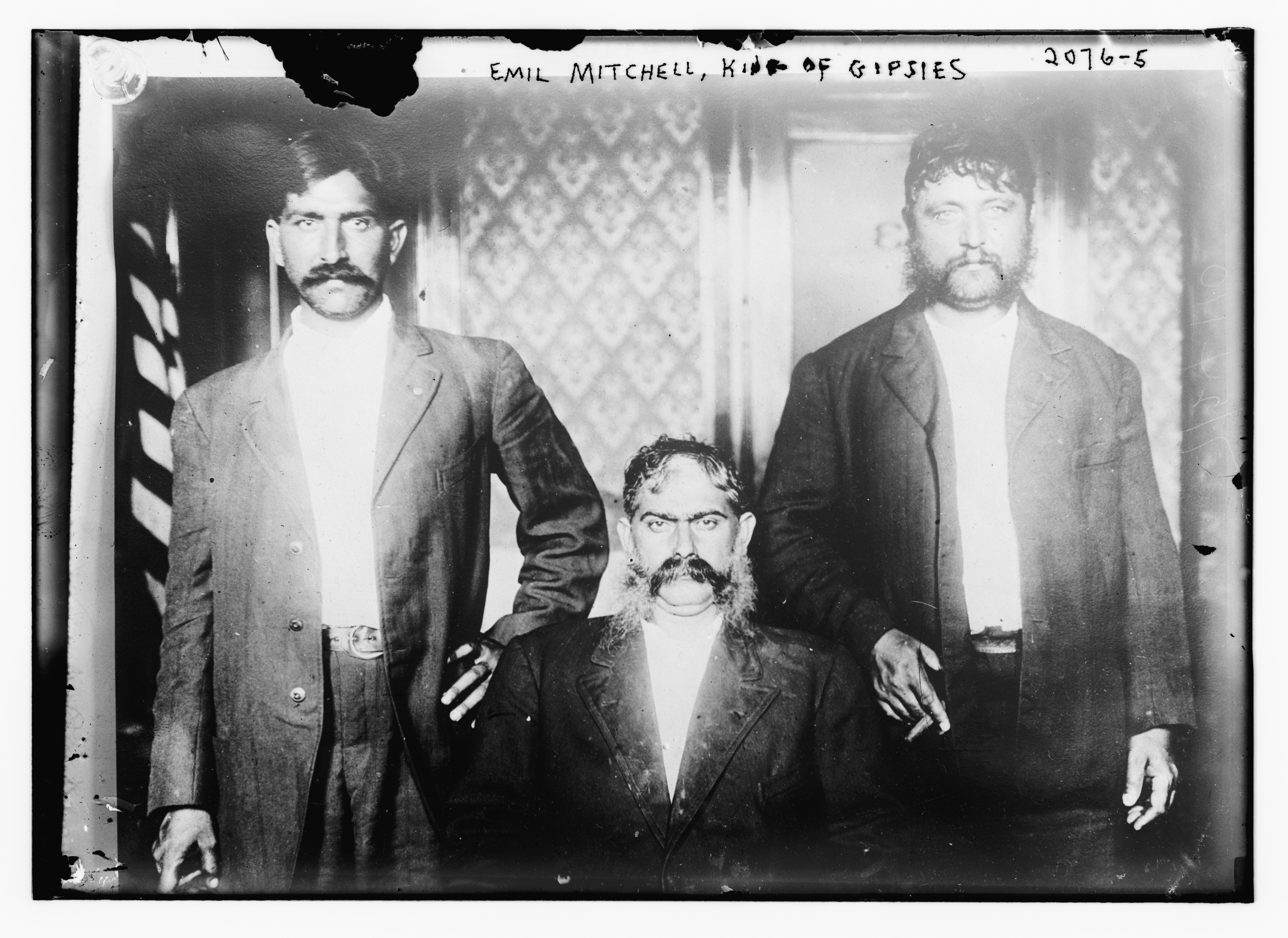

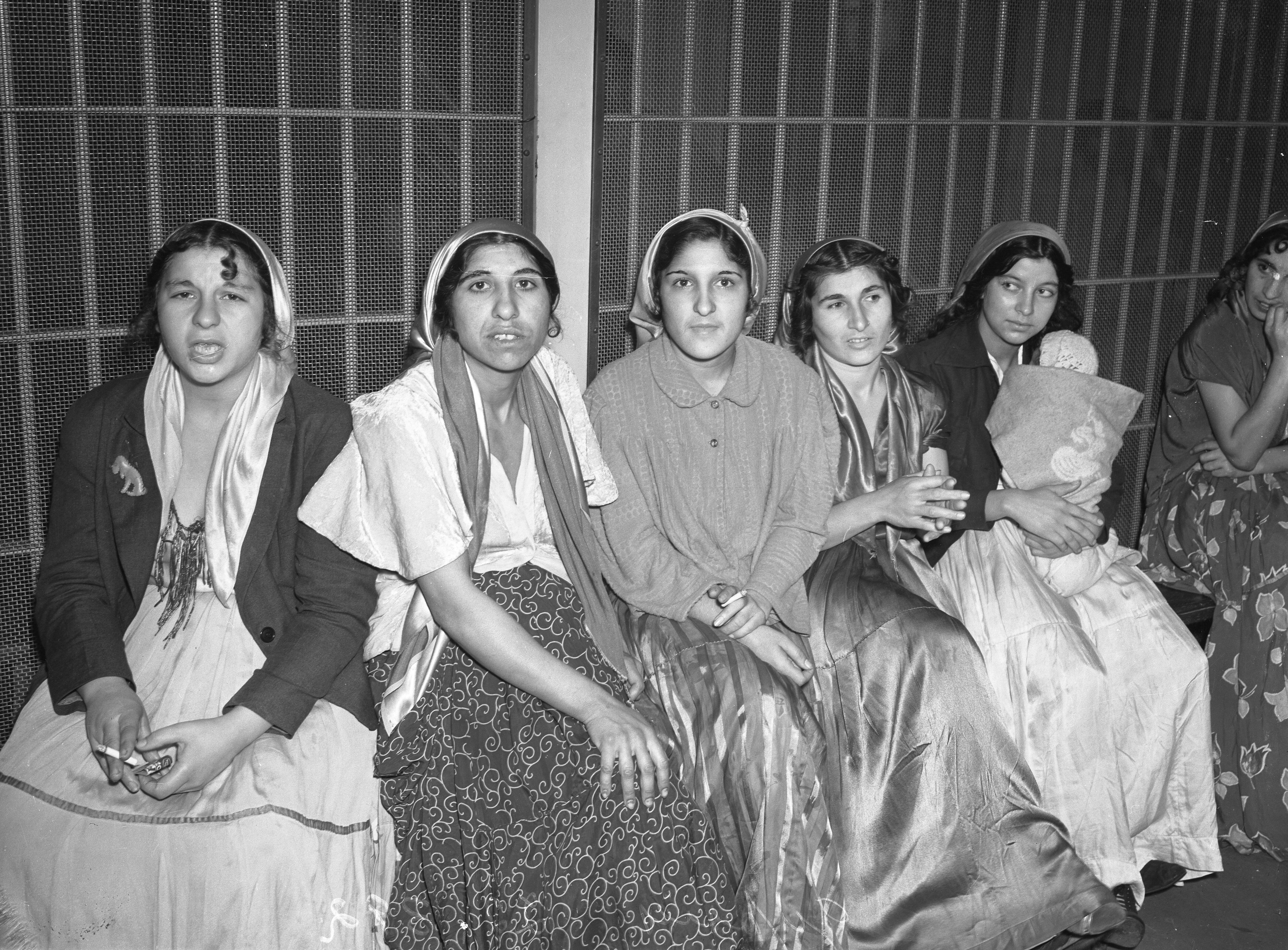

== Settlements ==
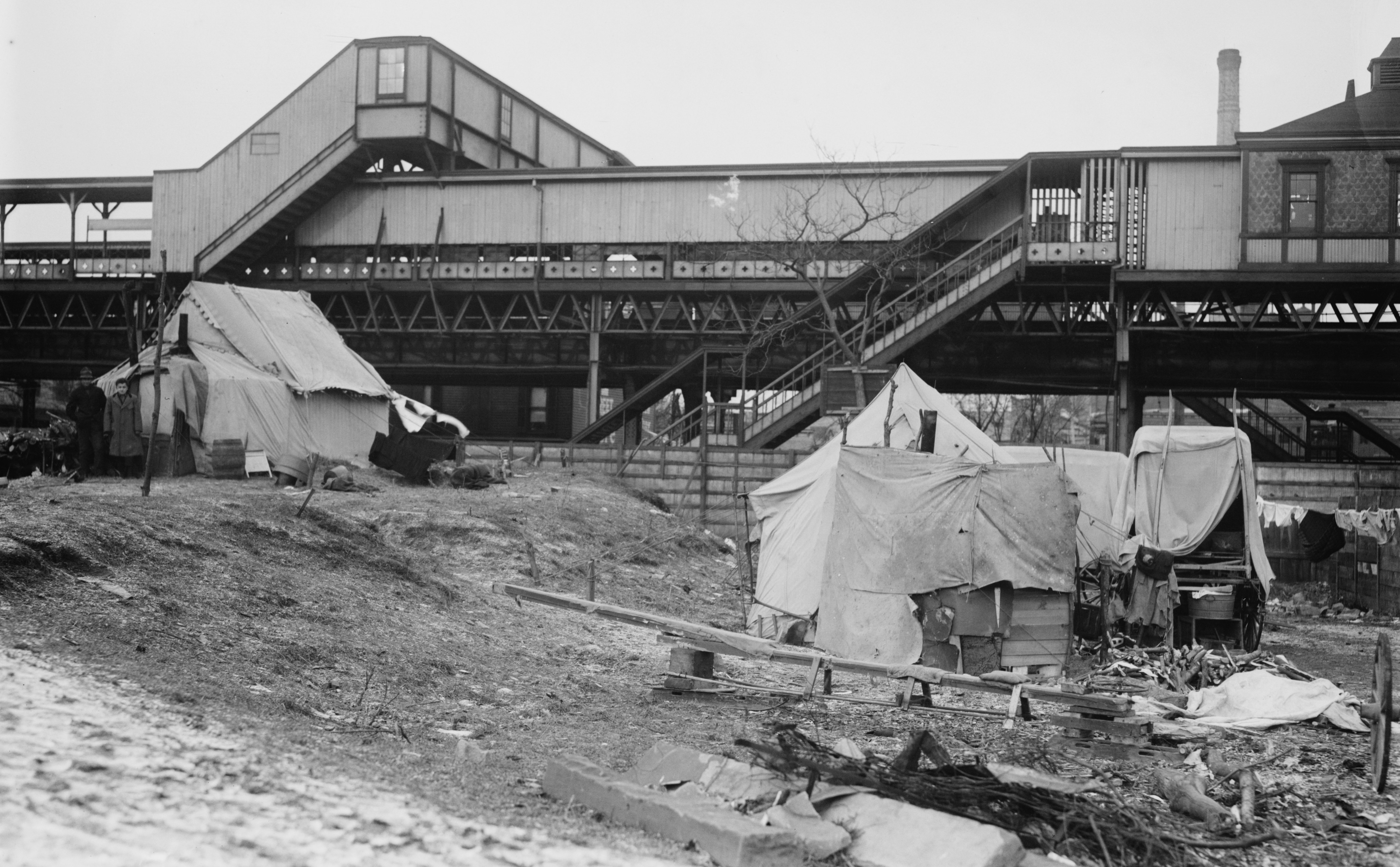
Romani camp in Brooklyn, New York, in 1909.

Romani Americans are concentrated in large cities such Chicago and Los Angeles and states such as New York, Virginia, Illinois, Texas, and Massachusetts.

Romani Americans live mainly in major urban areas such as Los Angeles, San Francisco, New York, Chicago, Boston, Atlanta, Dallas, Houston, Seattle, and Portland. Romani Americans today still migrate across the United States from the Midwest to Nevada, California, Texas, and elsewhere to live close to family and friends or for jobs. Some of the Roma who had once lived in Delay and then in the Dearborn area in Michigan moved to Las Vegas Valley to work or retire.

There are Vlax and Romanichal churches in large cities in the Southern United States such as Atlanta and Houston.

The Roma have lived and traveled throughout the state of New York.

Romani people are concentrated in the Northeast, the Midwest and the West Coast.

=== Chicago ===
The Roma first came to Chicago during the large waves of Southern and Eastern European immigration to the United States in the 1880s until World War I. Two separate Romani subgroups settled in Chicago, the Machwaya and the Kalderash. The Machwaya came from Serbia and parts of the Austro-Hungarian Empire. They settled on the Southeast Side of Chicago.

=== Connecticut ===
The Winsted Citizen in an article from 1947 reported that in the late 1800s Romani people visited Connecticut on a routine basis. In Hartford, there was a horse market that was owned by a Romani "King."

=== Kentucky ===
Numerous Romani individuals have relocated to Northern Kentucky.

=== Texas ===
There are about 20,000 Roma in Texas. In Texas, the two main Roma populations are Vlax and Romanichal. Romani Americans are concentrated in Houston and Fort Worth. Significant numbers of Romani families also live in Dallas, San Antonio, Austin, and El Paso. Nearly every large town in Texas has some Roma residents.

=== Louisiana ===
One of the most well-documented colonial Romani North American migrations involved many French Roma who helped build the French colony of Louisiana. The French Roma settled throughout Biloxi, New Orleans, Natchez to Natchitoches.

=== Nebraska ===
Romani people moved to rural areas in Nebraska in the 1930s. The Roma were known as shrewd horse traders.

=== New Jersey ===
The Roma are concentrated in the northeastern part of New Jersey, especially in the Newark, Paterson and Elizabeth area.

=== New York City ===
Many Romani moved to New York City from other parts of the United States after relief programs were put into effect in the 1930s. Roma from Hungary went to New York after the revolution in 1956. The Roma settled in the Bronx, Brooklyn, Manhattan, and Newark, New Jersey.

=== North Dakota ===
Gypsy caravans journeyed through North Dakota's territory since the 1880s and continued annually up until the 1940s.

=== Maryland ===
The highest concentration of Romani people in Maryland was in Baltimore in the 20th century but encampments were reported across the state.

=== Arkansas ===
There is a Romanichal community in Arkansas. They trace their lineage to England and Ireland.

=== California ===
Approximately 200,000 Roma live in California and 50,000 live in Los Angeles.

=== Michigan ===
There is a Hungarian-Slovak Romani community in Michigan.

=== Oregon ===
Romani have resided in Oregon since the early twentieth century. There is a Romani community in Portland.

=== Pennsylvania ===
The Roma have been present in the state since the mid-1800s,

=== West Virginia ===
A group of Roma settled in Stumpy Bottom in Princeton.

=== Cleveland ===
The Roma began settling on Cleveland's near west side in the 1880s.

=== Utah ===
Most of the Roma who came to Utah were of Balkan, Eastern, and Central European origin. They settled in Deseret, Elsinore, Oak City, Kanab, and other rural communities in Utah since the early 1900s.

=== Virginia ===
The Appalachian Mountains in Virginia provided a home for traveling Romani people during the first half of the 20th century.

== Groups ==
- Boyash: The Boyash are concentrated in the Northern United States.
- Kalderash: The Kalderash are concentrated in New York City, Chicago, and Fort Worth, Texas.
- Machwaya: The Machwaya came from Mačva, Serbia. Most Machwaya settled in California. Machwaya are concentrated in the San Francisco Bay Area and Greater Los Angeles. They brought many customs from Yugoslavia such as sarme (foods) and slava rituals.
- Rom: They number around 20,000. The Rom have spread across North America in large family groups and tend to stay together. The Rom have tried to continue in fortune telling, but they soon have moved on to roofing and car sales, traveling in trailers and mobile homes. Metal work is one of the preferred activities of the Rom men in car body repairs, scrap collecting, car sales and occasional coppersmithing, but more often do roofing, paving and home improvements. The women do fortune telling and sell cheap goods around the houses.
- Ludar: Hailing from North of the Balkans, Hungary, and the Banat, the Ludari, also known as Rudari, Boyash, or Banyash, are a subculture of Romani who arrived during the late 19th and early 20th centuries.
- Hungarian-Slovak Romani: The Romani of Northern Hungary largely settled in industrial cities of the Northern United States near the turn of the century. Among Romani from these areas were Olah, Romungre, and Bashalde immigrants. They were noted for their musical traditions and popularized Romani music in the United States by performing in cafes, night clubs and restaurants. Their prevalence in show business made Hungarian-Slovak Romani the most visible of the Romani groups arriving in America at the turn of the century and helped to shape the modern American idea of a Romani. The Bashalde reside principally in Pennsylvania, Ohio, Chicago and Las Vegas.
- Romanichal: The ancestral home of the Romanichals is the British Isles. Members of this group are found across the U.S., with concentrations in Arkansas, Texas and the Southeast.
- Black Dutch (genealogy): Sinte Romani from Germany, whom de Wendler-Funaro refers to as Chikkeners (Pennsylvania German, from the German Zigeuner), sometimes refer to themselves as "Black Dutch." They are few in number and claim to have largely assimilated into Romnichel culture. They are represented in de Wendler-Funaro's photographs by a few portraits of one old man and briefly referred to in the manuscript "In Search of the Last Caravan."
- Cale: Spanish Roma are found primarily in the metropolitan areas of the East Coast and the West Coast.
- Xoraxane Roma: Established mainly in the Bronx, New York where they have established mosques, the Xoraxane are a Muslim population originating in Macedonia and surrounding areas of the Balkans, several hundred families that came to the United States beginning in the late 1960s. Several thousand other Xoraxane came later as part of a Bosnian refugee program initiated St. Louis, Missouri, and are settled there.
- Lovari: Some 2,000 or more Lovari live in the Chicago metropolitan area. They descend from the Russian Roma who fled to Yugoslavia during the First World War, travelling back and forth into Hungary and intermarrying with Hungarian Lovari. After deciding to leave Europe a group of Lovari families arrived in Montreal, Canada on a Russian ship from France but were targeted for deportation. They then moved to St. Louis in 1973 and then on to Chicago to find relatives.
- Scottish Romani and Traveller groups: For centuries, the Tinkers, who were ethnically Scottish, remained separated from the mainstream society in Scotland. However, some of them migrated to Canada after 1850 and a significant number made their way to the United States after 1880. Although more than 100 distinct clans have been identified, the exact total number of Tinkers is still unknown.
- Yenish: A largely assimilated group of ethnic Germans, mistakenly identified as Gypsies, established a community in Pennsylvania after immigrating in 1840, primarily working as basket makers.

== Notable Romani Americans ==
- Gratiela Brancusi, actress
- Michael Costello, fashion designer
- Billy Drago, actor
- Eugene Hütz, Ukrainian-American musician, frontman of the "Gypsy Punk" band Gogol Bordello
- Ladislas Lazaro, politician
- Oksana Marafioti, writer
- Seanan McGuire, writer and musician
- Paul Nicholas Miller, better known as GypsyCrusader, white supremacist internet personality
- Hillary Monahan, writer
- Paul Polansky, writer and activist
- Chrissy Teigen, model
- Tracey Ullman, actress

== See also ==
- Romani people
- Romani studies
- Romani literature § United States
- Irish Traveller Americans
