= J. Scowcroft =

English footballer

Personal information
- Position: Defender

Senior career*
Years	Team	Apps	(Gls)
1888–1890	Bolton Wanderers	9	(1)
- * Club domestic league appearances and goals

J. Scowcroft was an English footballer who played in The Football League for Bolton Wanderers. He played in the inaugural Football League season of 1888-1889 and played 9 matches and scored one goal. His debut was in the 3rd month of the season, November 1888. The date was 03-Nov-1888, at Anfield, Liverpool, then home of Everton. Scowcroft replaced Bob Roberts at left-half, the latter had moved to left-back. All the action in the match was in the 2nd half, 0–0 at half-time. Everton went 1-0 up but Wanderers equalised. Everton got a winner and, although Wanderers came close they could not get an equaliser. Scowcroft' only goal was scored in an 8-goal thriller played on 08-Dec-1888 at Leamington Road, Blackburn, then home of Blackburn Rovers. Rovers, 2-0 up after 7 minutes lost their clean sheet in the game a minute later, as Scowcroft, playing centre-half, scored his only goal into the Rovers box. Scowcroft played 9 times for Wanderers between 03-Nov-1888 and his last game of the season, 12-Jan-1889. He made 7 appearances at centre-half and 2 at left-half. Wanderers finished the season in 5th place and scored 63 goals in 22 games, the 3rd highest of the season.
