= List of awards and nominations received by Tim Robbins =

Tim Robbins awards and nominations
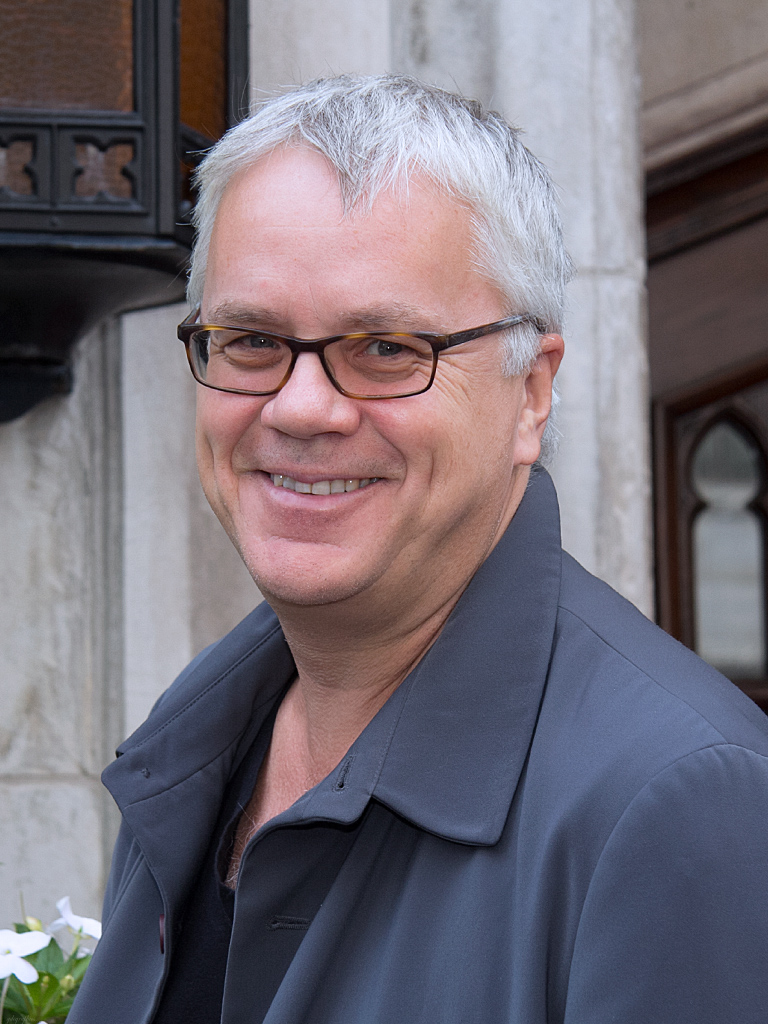
- Robbins at TIFF in 2012
Awards and nominations
Award	Wins	Nominations
Academy Awards	1	2
BAFTA Awards	0	2
Critics' Choice	1	1
Golden Globes	2	6
Grammy Awards	0	1
SAG Awards	1	3

Totals (Note: Certain award groups do not simply award one winner. They acknowledge several different recipients, have runners-up, and have third place. Since this is a specific recognition and is different from losing an award, runner-up mentions are considered wins in this award tally. For simplification and to avoid errors, each award in this list has been presumed to have had a prior nomination.)
- Wins: 37
- Nominations: 43

The following a list of awards and nominations received by Tim Robbins

Tim Robbins is an American actor and director. He has received various accolades including an Academy Award, a Critics' Choice Movie Award, two Golden Globe Awards and a Screen Actors Guild Award as well as nominations for two BAFTA Awards and a Grammy Award. Robbins has also received awards from the Cannes Film Festival, Berlin International Film Festival, and the Venice Film Festival.

Robbins earned early acclaim for his leading role as a Hollywood studio executive in the Robert Altman satirical black comedy mystery The Player (1992), for which he won the Cannes Film Festival Award for Best Actor and was nominated for the BAFTA Award for Best Actor in a Leading Role and the Golden Globe Award for Best Actor in a Motion Picture – Musical or Comedy. That same year he wrote, directed and starred as a Republican running for Senate in the mockumentary film Bob Roberts (1992), for which he earned a nomination for the Golden Globe Award for Best Actor in a Motion Picture – Musical or Comedy. He reunited with Robert Altman acting in the ensemble dramedy Short Cuts (1993) playing a cop cheating on his wife, a role for which he won the Golden Globe Special Award for Acting Ensemble with the cast.

He gained further prominence taking a co-leading role as the prisoner Andy Dufresne in the drama The Shawshank Redemption (1994) earning an nomination for the Screen Actors Guild Award for Outstanding Actor in a Leading Role. The following year he directed the crime drama Dead Man Walking (1995) for which he won the Berlin International Film Festival's Prize of the Ecumenical Jury and was nominated for the Academy Award for Best Director, the Golden Bear, and the Golden Globe Award for Best Screenplay. For his role as a Boston man sexual abused as a young boy in the Clint Eastwood directed drama Mystic River he won the Academy Award, the Critics' Choice Movie Award, Golden Globe Award the Screen Actors Guild Award for Best Supporting Actor as well as nomination for the BAFTA Award for Best Actor in a Supporting Role.

On television, Robbins played a television producer in the HBO drama television film Cinema Verite (2011) for which he was nominated for the Golden Globe Award for Best Supporting Actor – Series, Miniseries or Television Film. Robbins was also nominated for the Grammy Award for Best Spoken Word Album for narrating the F. Scott Fitzgerald classic American novel The Great Gatsby in 2003.

== Major associations ==
=== Academy Awards ===
Year	Category	Nominated work	Result	Ref.
1996	Best Director	Dead Man Walking	Nominated	
2004	Best Supporting Actor	Mystic River	Won	

=== BAFTA Awards ===
Year	Category	Nominated work	Result	Ref.
British Academy Film Awards
1993	Best Actor in a Leading Role	The Player	Nominated	
2004	Best Actor in a Supporting Role	Mystic River	Nominated	

=== Critics' Choice Awards ===
Year	Category	Nominated work	Result	Ref.
2004	Best Supporting Actor	Mystic River	Won	

=== Golden Globe Awards ===
Year	Category	Nominated work	Result	Ref.
1993	Best Actor in a Motion Picture – Comedy or Musical	The Player	Won	
1993	Best Actor in a Motion Picture – Comedy or Musical	Bob Roberts	Nominated	
1994	Special Award for Ensemble Cast (non-competitive)	Short Cuts	Recipient	
1996	Best Screenplay	Dead Man Walking	Nominated	
2004	Best Supporting Actor – Motion Picture	Mystic River	Won	
2012	Best Supporting Actor – Series, Miniseries or Television Film	Cinema Verite	Nominated	

=== Grammy Awards ===
Year	Category	Nominated work	Result	Ref.
2003	Best Spoken Word Album	The Great Gatsby	Nominated	

=== Screen Actors Guild Awards ===
Year	Category	Nominated work	Result	Ref.
1995	Outstanding Actor in a Leading Role	The Shawshank Redemption	Nominated	
2004	Outstanding Ensemble in a Motion Picture	Mystic River	Nominated	
2004	Outstanding Actor in a Supporting Role	Mystic River	Won	

== Miscellaneous awards ==
Organizations	Year	Category	Nominated work	Result	Ref.
Australian Film Institute	1996	Best Foreign Film Award	Dead Man Walking	Nominated	
Berlin International Film Festival	1996	Prize of the Ecumenical Jury	Dead Man Walking	Won	
Berlin International Film Festival	1996	Prize of the Guild of German Art House Cinemas	Dead Man Walking	Won	
Berlin International Film Festival	1996	Reader Jury of the "Berliner Morgenpost"	Dead Man Walking	Won	
Berlin International Film Festival	1996	Golden Berlin Bear	Dead Man Walking	Nominated	
Berlin International Film Festival	2016	Berlinale Camera	Special Award	Won	
Cannes Film Festival	1992	Best Actor	The Player	Won	
Cannes Film Festival	1999	Palme d'Or	Cradle Will Rock	Nominated	
Chicago Film Critics Association	1992	Best Actor	The Player	Nominated	
Chicago Film Critics Association	2003	Best Supporting Actor	Mystic River	Won	
Karlovy Vary International Film Festival	2018	Crystal Globe	Life's Work	Won	

Directed Academy Award performances
Under Robbins' direction, these actors have received Academy Award nominations (and one win) for their performances in their respective roles.

Year	Performer	Film	Result
Academy Award for Best Actor
1996	Sean Penn	Dead Man Walking	Nominated
Academy Award for Best Actress
1996	Susan Sarandon	Dead Man Walking	Won
