= Big Fat Gypsy Weddings =

British television documentary series

- Genre: Documentary
- Created by: Jenny Popplewell
- Directed by: Sam Emmery Morag Tinto Jenny Popplewell Osca Humphreys
- Starring: Paddy Doherty
- Narrated by: Barbara Flynn
- Composer: Ian Livingstone
- Country of origin: United Kingdom
- Original language: English
- No. of seasons: 4
- No. of episodes: 18

Production
- Executive producer: Jes Wilkins
- Production location: United Kingdom/Ireland
- Editor: George Taylor
- Running time: 49 minutes
- Production company: Firecracker Films

Original release
- Network: Channel 4
- Release: 18 February 2010 – 6 April 2015

Related
- My Big Fat American Gypsy Wedding

Big Fat Gypsy Weddings is a British documentary series broadcast on Channel 4, that explored the lives and traditions of several Irish Traveller and Romanichal families in the United Kingdom as they prepared to unite one of their members in marriage. The series has been criticised for not accurately representing England’s Romani and Travelling community. It was first broadcast in February 2010 as a one-off documentary called My Big Fat Gypsy Wedding, filmed as part of the Cutting Edge series and voted Most Groundbreaking Show in the Cultural Diversity Awards 2010. A series of 5 episodes were later commissioned, and the series first aired in January 2011. A second series began airing in February 2012. A third series was not commissioned, rather the show ended with eleven stand-alone specials.

In North America, the show airs on TLC under the title My Big Fat Gypsy Wedding, with the original narration by Barbara Flynn replaced by Ellen K., while the TLC network started airing a spin-off featuring American Roma called My Big Fat American Gypsy Wedding.

== Reception ==
The show has been criticised mainly by the Irish Traveller & British Gypsy/Traveller communities for misrepresenting them. Jane Jackson of the Rural Media Company (publishers the Travellers' Times) said:

It's posing as a documentary, the voiceover is saying we're going to let you into the secrets of the traveller community – and it [sic] just not true. It might be true of the particular families in front of the camera, but it's not generally true. They're made to look totally feckless, not really to be taken seriously as an ethnic group.

Executive Producer Jes Wilkins said:

The problem has been with the media response, particularly from the tabloid press. It's become one of the big cultural phenomena of this part of the year and people are looking for something to write about it, something provocative. Some [sic] these articles have upset our contributors which has been disappointing.

Billy Welch, a spokesman for Romani Gypsies, said:

While Channel 4 should be praised for at least differentiating between Irish Travellers and Romani Gypsies, the first three episodes have in fact focused exclusively on Irish Travellers and their traditions: They called the show Big Fat Gypsy Wedding and you've yet to see a Romani Gypsy in it.

During the episode No Place Like Home, Big Fat Gypsy Weddings had 4 of the top 10 trending topics worldwide on social networking website Twitter.

In June 2011, TLC rebroadcast the show and was filming a U.S. version.

== Ratings ==
Big Fat Gypsy Weddings opened in 2011. The second episode got 7.4m viewers at its peak. It was the eighth highest rating in Channel 4's history. The final episode was watched by 6.5 million viewers, easily beating the 2011 BRIT Awards which had an average viewership of 4.8 million.

== Controversies ==
The series has faced a number of controversies, including allegations of racism in its advertising and instigating a rise in the rate of racially motivated bullying.

The episode "No Place Like Home" caused controversy after it showed young girls provocatively dancing and wearing full make-up.

== Awards ==
Broadcast readers voted the series' progenitor, My Big Fat Gypsy Wedding, the 'Most Groundbreaking Programme' at the Cultural Diversity Awards 2010. Executive producer Jes Wilkins and creator and Producer Jenny Popplewell were in attendance to accept the award.

Big Fat Gypsy Wedding Series 1 was nominated for a BAFTA in the YouTube Audience Vote category.

== Episodes ==
=== My Big Fat Gypsy Wedding (2010) ===
Title	Original release date	Ratings
"My Big Fat Gypsy Wedding"	18 February 2010	5,567,000; 813,000 (+1)

=== Series 1 ===
No.	Title	Original release date	Ratings
1	"Born to Be Wed"	29 January 2011	7,280,000; 958,000 (+1)
16-year-old Josie marries her fiancee Swanley after four months of dating.
2	"No Place Like Home"	16 April 2011	7,467,000; 1,255,000 (+1)
3	"Desperate Housewives"	23 April 2011	8,032,000; 1,301,000 (+1)
4	"Boys Will Be Boys"	30 April 2011	8,804,000; 906,000 (+1)
5	"Bride & Prejudice"	14 May 2011	8,048,000; 1,193,000 (+1)

=== Royal wedding special (2011) ===
No.	Title	Original release date	Ratings
–	"Big Fat Royal Gypsy Weddings"	29 April 2011	4,561,000; 760,000 (+1)
Royal wedding special following the wedding of Irish traveller Mary, the first wedding fully planned by dressmaker Thelma Madine. Notably, it first aired the night before the wedding of Prince William and Kate Middleton.

=== Christmas special (2011) ===
No.	Title	Original release date	Ratings
–	"My Big Fat Gypsy Christmas"	13 December 2011	6,367,000; 879,000 (+1)
Follows the celebrations and traditions of the gypsy community at Christmas, as well as the weddings of Lavinia and Charlene respectively. In addition to this, the program covers a mass first communion.

=== Series 2 ===
No.	Title	Original release date	Ratings
2.1	"Diamantes Are Forever"	14 February 2012	6,027,000; 1,178,000 (+1)
Follows 16-year-old Sammy Jo as she takes part in a traveller-only beauty pageant. Irish Traveler Dolores commissions dresses from Thelma Madine for her wedding in Rathkeale, Ireland. Four cousins compete to have the most memorable outfit at their first Holy Communion.
2.2	"I Fought the Law"	21 February 2012	5,034,000; 1,251,000 (+1)
This episode shows how Romani gypsies and travellers' attempts to live a traditional life can get them in trouble with the law. Covers the hen party of Danielle, whose fiancee happens to be in court on the same day. Also features an illegal horse-and-trap road race, a family faced with eviction from their illegal site and 8-year-old Chloe (preparing for her First Holy Communion) visiting her father in prison.
2.3	"School of Hard Knocks"	28 February 2012	5,579,000; 1,273,000 (+1)
Follows several traveller girls and their differing experiences with education, ranging from those who left school illegally early to those who are "bucking the trend" by completing their secondary education. Alice talks about her encounters with school bullying.
2.4	"Love Conquers All"	6 March 2012	6,040,000; 1,194,000 (+1)
2.5	"Reputation is Everything"	13 March 2012	5,269,000; 1,114,000 (+1)
After causing a scandal by spending time alone with her boyfriend, Irish traveller Rosanne is rushed up the aisle to save her reputation.
2.6	"Out of Site, Out of Mind"	20 March 2012	5,341,000; 954,000 (+1)
17-year-old Freda prepares to get married and leave home for the first time. Chantelle plans her own wedding in Rathkeale, Ireland. Dale Farm faces eviction.
2.7	"We Are Family"	27 March 2012	4,546,000

=== Stand-alone specials ===
Channel 4 confirmed there would not be a third series of Big Fat Gypsy Weddings but instead would end the show with six stand-alone specials that were to be aired throughout 2013. Despite this, eleven specials have aired to date.

The eighth special, called Big Fat Gypsy Christmas: Carols and Caravans on the website's official episode guide, features the same title card and animation as My Big Fat Gypsy Christmas, the last episode of the first season. This often leads to confusion between the two.

The latest special to air was titled My Big Fat Gypsy Grand National, this was shown on 6 April 2015.

No.	Title	Original release date	Ratings
–	"My Big Fat Gypsy Valentine"	11 February 2013	4,460,000; 596,000 (+1)
This one-off Valentine's special explores love and courtship in the Traveller community, following Ina and Danielle as they prepare to wed their first loves. This episode famously featured Joe 'Valentine' Gaastra the head of the Royal Wootton Bassett Gypsy and Amish community in typical jovial mood on the dance floor.
–	"My Big Fat Gypsy Fortune"	14 April 2013	3,145,000; 589,000 (+1)
–	"Best Dressed Brides"	26 April 2013	(outside top 10)
Dressmaker Thelma Madine reveals the secrets behind her most outrageous creations, from design and production through to the unique excitement of a Traveller or Gypsy wedding day. Thelma relives the mayhem and magic that went into creating the most incredible outfits, recalling everything from glow- in-the-dark wedding dresses to her famous pineapple and palm tree costumes.
–	"Life on the Run"	10 June 2013	3,110,000; 348,000 (+1)
–	"The Luck of the Irish"	30 August 2013	2,051,000; 466,000 (+1)
–	"My Big Fat Gypsy Ladies' Day"	24 September 2013	2,224,000; 439,000 (+1)
–	"My Big Fat Gypsy Christening"	1 October 2013	(outside top 10)
–	"Big Fat Gypsy Christmas: Carols and Caravans"	25 November 2013	(outside top 10)
–	"My Big Fat Gypsy Holiday"	2 January 2014	(outside top 10)
–	"My Big Fat Gypsy Christmas: Tinsel and Tiaras"	9 December 2014	N/A
–	"My Big Fat Gypsy Grand National"	6 April 2015	N/A
