= Thelma Madine =

British dressmaker and television personality

Thelma Madine-Akin
- Born: Thelma Makin; 1952 (age 73–74); Liverpool, United Kingdom
- Occupations: Dressmaker, Wedding Plannee, TV personality
- Television: Big Fat Gypsy Weddings; My Big Fat American Gypsy Wedding; Thelma's Gypsy Girls
- Children: Tracey Madine; Kenneth Madine; Hayley Madine; Katrina Lazarus-Bhatti

Thelma Madine-Akin (née Makin) is a wedding dressmaker born in Liverpool. She rose to fame after appearing as the traveller wedding dressmaker in My Big Fat Gypsy Wedding, a Channel 4 documentary on Irish Travellers as they prepare for marriage. She is best known for her outlandish creations, including a palm tree wedding gown with Swarovski crystals.

== Early life and education ==
Thelma Makin was born in 1952 in Liverpool. She grew up in Croxteth, Liverpool, with her older brother, Tom. Her father, Leo, was an engineer, and her mother, Thelma, worked in catering. After she left school, she worked in wedding catering with her mother. In 1971, at the age of 18, she married Kenny Madine, a businessman with a successful glass company, and the couple had 4 children: Kenneth, Tracey and Hayley the couple also adopted a daughter named Katrina. Thelma and Kenny divorced in 1999. She remarried a year later in 2000, to Peter Akin; their marriage was short lived and they divorced shortly after. Madine continues to use her first husband's surname in order to share the same name as her children.

== Career ==
With a loan from her aunt and her divorce settlement money, Madine began selling her handmade dresses on a market stall. Madine set up her own chain of children's clothing shops in 2002 called Madine's Miniatures in the Liverpool area. Business took off when she began designing Communion outfits, but a few years later business disintegrated and she was forced to close shop. In 2006, she managed to resurrect her business with financial help from her aunt and a business partner. She set up a stall in Paddy's Market still selling Communion clothes, specialising in christening outfits for girls. Madine's designs were inspired by the elaborateness of historical outfits. In 2003, a traveller woman who frequented her stall, and had become her friend, asked Madine to make a wedding dress for her daughter. After that, she received more requests, which led to her setting up her now-famous wedding dress shop, and gradually attracted the attention of the media, including Dr Jenny Popplewell, the creator and developer of Big Fat Gypsy Weddings. Madine has in recent years progressed to offering wedding planning services.

== My Big Fat Gypsy Wedding ==
Madine initially declined invitations to appear on the Channel 4 show, My Big Fat Gypsy Wedding, as she had done something similar in 2007 and did not like the way the traveller community had been portrayed. Eventually she agreed and the show became a success.

== Writing ==
In 2012, Madine published a book, Tales of the Gypsy Dressmaker, about her experiences with the traveller community.

== Figurines ==
In 2014, she teamed up with The English Ladies Co, china figurines designers based in Stoke-on-Trent, to create a range of figurines called Gypsy Wedding Dreams. Each figurine is inspired by Madine's wedding dress designs, and individually handmade by artisans, hence the unique appearance and high attention to detail.
