= Tim Robbins filmography =

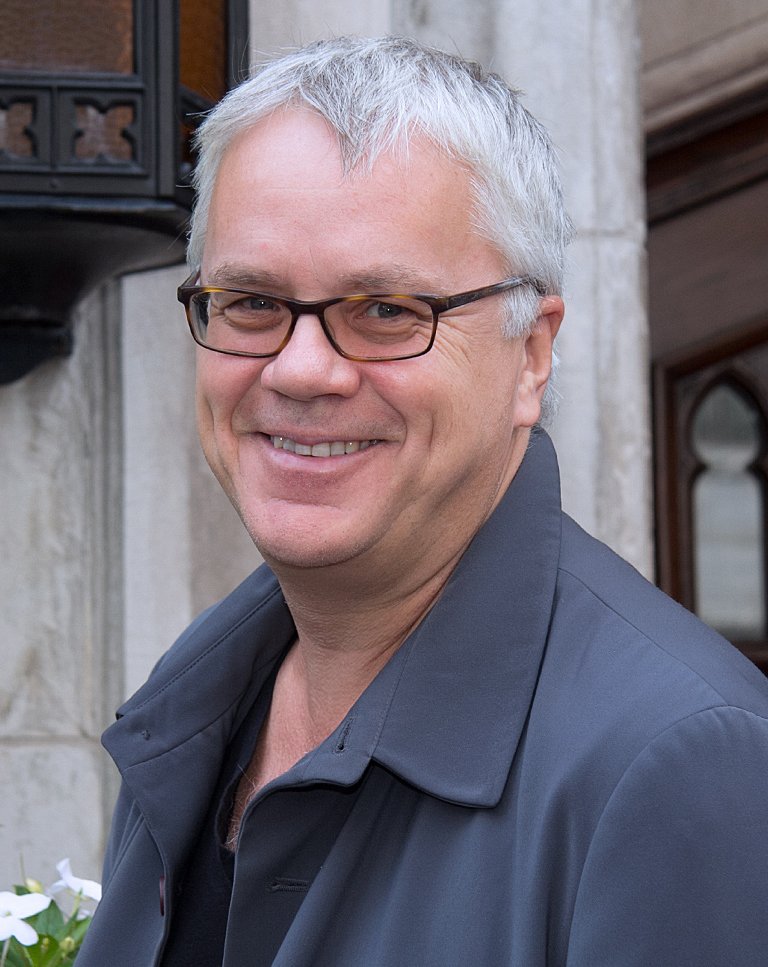
Robbins attending the Toronto International Film Festival in September 2012

American actor and filmmaker Tim Robbins started his acting career in 1982 with a few episodes on the medical drama series St. Elsewhere. His film debut was in the 1984 action film Toy Soldiers. He had a key role in Fraternity Vacation (1985) and a minor role in Top Gun (1986) before co-starring in the 1988 romantic comedy sports film Bull Durham with Kevin Costner. He went on to star in the films Erik the Viking with Mickey Rooney (1989), Jacob's Ladder with Elizabeth Peña (1990), Cadillac Man with Robin Williams (also 1990), and The Player with Greta Scacchi (1992). In 1994, he portrayed Andy Dufresne in The Shawshank Redemption with Morgan Freeman. To prepare for his role, he spent time in solitary confinement. He also appeared in the 2000 comedy film High Fidelity with John Cusack. In 2003, he co-starred in Clint Eastwood's neo-noir crime drama film Mystic River with Sean Penn. For that role, he won the Academy Award for Best Supporting Actor and Golden Globe Award for Best Supporting Actor – Motion Picture.

His television work includes the comedy series The Brink (2015), drama series Here and Now (2018), and psychological horror series Castle Rock (2019). As a director, Robbins has directed the films Bob Roberts (1992), Dead Man Walking (1995), and Cradle Will Rock (1999). For Dead Man Walking, he earned an Academy Award nomination for Best Director.

== Film ==
Key
†	Denotes films that have not yet been released

Year	Title	Role	Notes
1984	Toy Soldiers	Boe	
1984	No Small Affair	Nelson	
1985	Fraternity Vacation	Larry "Mother" Tucker	
1985	The Sure Thing	Gary Cooper	
1986	Howard the Duck	Phil Blumburtt	
1986	Top Gun	LTJG. Samuel "Merlin" Wells	
1988	Five Corners	Harry	
1988	Bull Durham	Ebby Calvin "Nuke" LaLoosh	
1988	Tapeheads	Josh Tager	
1989	Erik the Viking	Erik	
1989	Miss Firecracker	Delmount Williams	
1989	Twister	Jeff	
1990	Jacob's Ladder	Jacob Singer	
1990	Cadillac Man	Larry	
1991	Jungle Fever	Jerry	
1992	Bob Roberts	Bob Roberts	Also writer and director
1992	The Player	Griffin Mill	
1993	Short Cuts	Gene Shepard	
1994	I.Q.	Ed Walters	
1994	Prêt-à-Porter	Joe Flynne	Title in English: Ready to Wear
1994	The Shawshank Redemption	Andy Dufresne	
1994	The Hudsucker Proxy	Norville Barnes	
1995	Dead Man Walking	—N/a	Writer and director only
1997	Nothing to Lose	Nick Beam	
1999	Austin Powers: The Spy Who Shagged Me	"The President"	
1999	Cradle Will Rock	Voice on Film Reel	Uncredited voice; also writer and director
1999	Arlington Road	Oliver Lang/William Fenimore	
2000	Mission to Mars	Woodrow "Woody" Blake	
2000	High Fidelity	Ian "Ray" Raymond	
2001	Antitrust	Gary Winston	
2001	Human Nature	Dr. Nathan Bronfman	
2001	The Party's Over	Himself	
2002	The Truth About Charlie	Lewis Bartholomew	
2003	Mystic River	Dave Boyle	
2003	Code 46	William Geld	
2004	Anchorman: The Legend of Ron Burgundy	Public News Anchor	Uncredited cameo
2005	The Secret Life of Words	Josef	
2005	War of the Worlds	Harlan Ogilvy	
2005	Zathura: A Space Adventure	Mr. Budwing	Cameo
2006	Tenacious D in The Pick of Destiny	The Stranger	
2006	Catch a Fire	Nic Vos	
2007	Noise	David Owen	
2008	The Lucky Ones	Fred Cheaver	
2008	City of Ember	Loris Harrow	
2011	Green Lantern	Senator Robert Hammond	
2011	Revenge of the Electric Car	Narrator	
2012	Back to 1942	Father Megan	
2012	Thanks for Sharing	Mike	
2013	Life of Crime	Frank Dawson	
2014	Welcome to Me	Dr. Moffat	
2015	A Perfect Day	B	
2017	Marjorie Prime	Jon	
2019	VHYes	Sir Roger Handley III	
2019	Dark Waters	Tom Terp	
2027	The Catch †		Filming

== Television ==
Year	Title	Role	Notes
1982	St. Elsewhere	Andrew Reinhardt	3 episodes
1983	At Ease	Medic	Episode: "A Tankful of Dollars"
1983	Quarterback Princess	Marvin	Television film
1984	Legmen	Brewster Kingston	Episode: "How the Other Half Dies"
1984	Hardcastle and McCormick	Inmate Johnson	Episode: "Scared Stiff"
1984	Santa Barbara	Man	Episode #1.8
1984	The Love Boat	Young Erik	2 episodes
1984	Hill Street Blues	Officer Lawrence "Larry" Swann	Episode: "Rookie Nookie"
1985	Moonlighting	Fremmer	Episode: "Gunfight at the So-So Corral"
1985	Malice in Wonderland	Joseph Cotten	Television film
1986	Amazing Stories	Jordan's Phantom	Episode: "Mirror, Mirror"
1986	Saturday Night Live	Bob Roberts	Episode: "Steve Guttenberg/The Pretenders"; uncredited
1992	Saturday Night Live	Himself (host)	Episode: "Tim Robbins/Sinéad O'Connor"
1999	The Simpsons	Jim Hope	Voice; episode: "Grift of the Magi"
2003	Freedom: A History of Us	Various	Voice; 3 episodes
2005	Jack & Bobby	Pres. Robert McCallister	Voice; episode: "Legacy"
2011	Cinema Verite	Bill Loud	Television film
2012	Portlandia	Excellency	2 episodes
2014	The Spoils of Babylon	Jonas Morehouse	Miniseries; 4 episodes
2015	The Spoils Before Dying	Red-Vested Bartender	Episode: "The Trip Trap"
2015	The Brink	Secretary of State Walter Larson	Main cast; 10 episodes; director (episode: "Half-Cocked")
2018	Here and Now	Greg Boatwright	Main cast; 10 episodes
2019	Castle Rock	Reginald "Pop" Merrill	Main cast (season 2)
2023–2026	Silo	Bernard Holland	Main cast; 28 episodes
