= David Robbins (composer) =

American music composer

David Robbins is an American music composer. He is a brother of actor and director Tim Robbins. He has written many works for television and films, including the films Dead Man Walking and Bob Roberts.
