= Tim Robbins =

American actor (born 1958)

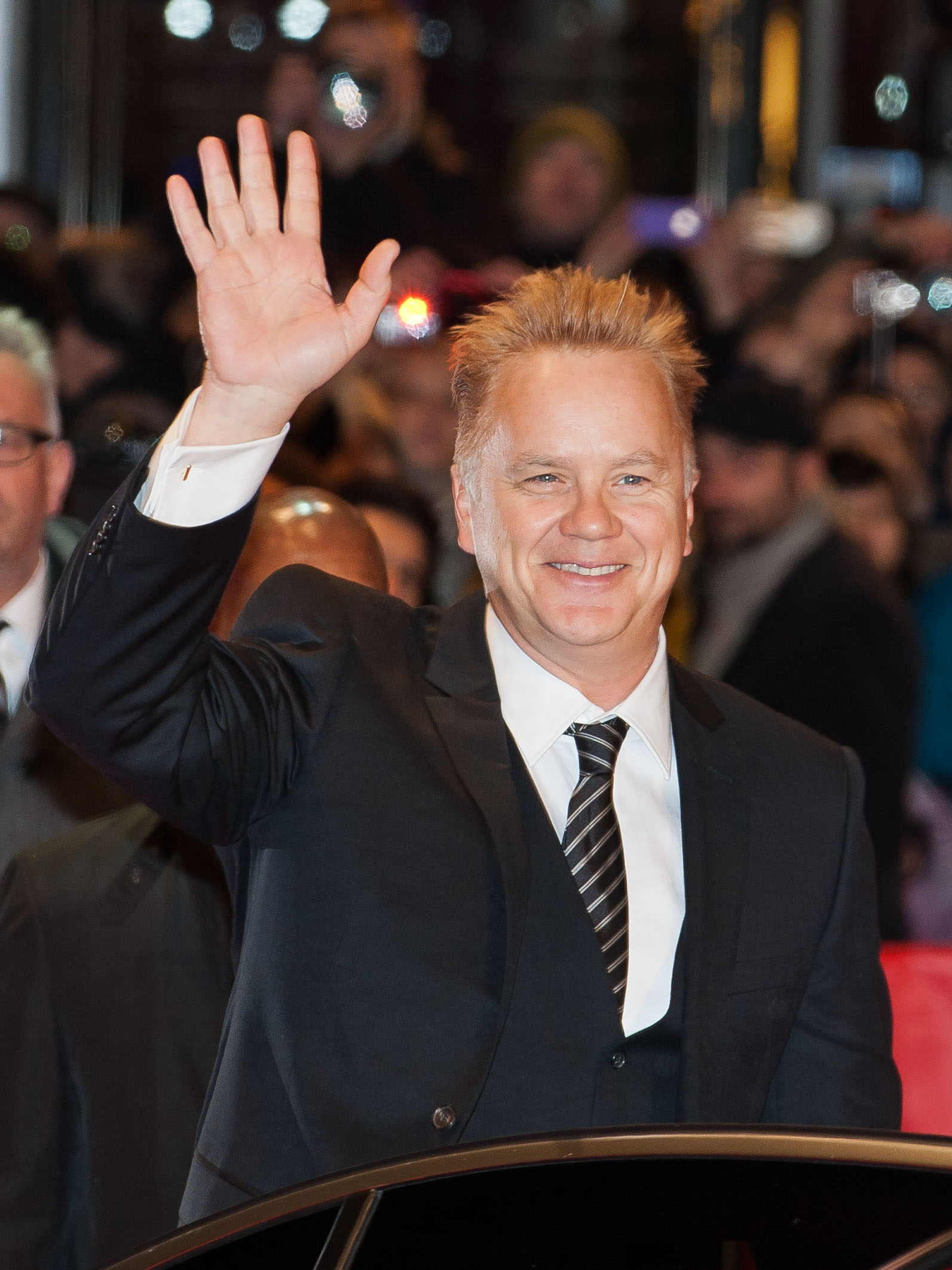
- Robbins at the 2013 Berlin Film Festival
- Born: Timothy Francis Robbins; October 16, 1958 (age 68); West Covina, California, U.S.
- Education: University of California, Los Angeles (BA)
- Occupations: Actor; director; producer; screenwriter
- Years active: 1982–present
- Works: Full list
- Spouse: Gratiela Brancusi (m. 2017; div. 2022)
- Partner: Susan Sarandon (1988–2009)
- Children: 2, including Miles
- Father: Gil Robbins
- Awards: Full list
- Tim Robbins's voice from the BBC program Front Row, September 2, 2010
- Website: timrobbins.net

Timothy Francis Robbins (born October 16, 1958) is an American actor, director, producer, and writer. Known for his work on film and television, his accolades include an Academy Award, an Actor Award, and three Golden Globe Awards, in addition to nominations for two BAFTAs and a Grammy Award.

Robbins made his acting debut in St. Elsewhere (1982) before taking supporting roles in The Sure Thing (1985), Top Gun (1986), Bull Durham (1988), and Jungle Fever (1991). He took leading roles in Jacob's Ladder (1990), The Player (1992), The Shawshank Redemption (1994), The Hudsucker Proxy (1994), I.Q. (1994), and Nothing to Lose (1997). For his role in the Clint Eastwood-directed drama Mystic River (2003) he won the Academy Award, the Golden Globe Award, and the Screen Actors Guild Award for Outstanding Actor in a Supporting Role. He later acted in Zathura (2005), The Lucky Ones (2007), Green Lantern (2011), and Dark Waters (2019).

As a director, he gained acclaim for the crime drama Dead Man Walking (1995), earning him a nomination for the Academy Award for Best Director. He also directed the satirical mockumentary film Bob Roberts (1992) and the historical drama Cradle Will Rock (1999). On television, Robbins played a Secretary of State in the HBO comedy The Brink (2015), a philosophy professor in the HBO drama series Here and Now (2018), the patriarch of a crime family in the Hulu series Castle Rock (2019), and the all-powerful, dictatorial "Head of IT" in the futurist, dystopian Apple TV+ series Silo (2023–present). For his role as a Hollywood producer in the HBO television film Cinema Verite (2011) he was nominated for a Golden Globe Award.

Robbins was in a long romantic relationship with actor Susan Sarandon from 1988 to 2009, with whom he has two sons. He was married to actress Gratiela Brancusi from 2017 to 2022. He is known for his extensive liberal activism, including opposition to the Iraq War.

== Early life and education ==
Robbins was born in West Covina, California, and raised in New York City. He attended Stuyvesant High School. His parents were Mary Cecelia (née Bledsoe), a musician, and Gilbert Lee Robbins, a singer, actor, and manager of The Gaslight Cafe. Robbins has two sisters, Adele and Gabrielle, and a brother, composer David Robbins. He was raised Catholic.

Robbins moved to Greenwich Village with his family at a young age while his father pursued a career as a member of a folk music group called the Highwaymen. Robbins started performing in theater at age twelve and joined the drama club at Stuyvesant High School (Class of 1976). He spent two years at SUNY Plattsburgh and then returned to California to study at the UCLA Film School, graduating with a Bachelor of Arts degree in Drama in 1981.

== Career ==
=== 1980–1987: Early work ===
Robbins's acting career began at Theater for the New City, where he spent his teenage years in their Annual Summer Street Theater and also played the title role in a musical adaptation of Antoine de Saint-Exupéry's The Little Prince. After graduation from college in 1981, Robbins founded the Actors' Gang, an experimental theater group, in Los Angeles with actor friends from his college softball team, as well as John Cusack.

In 1982, he appeared as domestic terrorist Andrew Reinhardt in three episodes of the television program St. Elsewhere. He had a small role in the film No Small Affair (1984), starring Demi Moore. In 1985, he guest-starred in the second episode of the television series Moonlighting, "Gunfight at the So-So Corral". He also took parts in films, such as the role of frat animal "Mother" in Fraternity Vacation (1985) and Lt Sam "Merlin" Wells in the fighter pilot film Top Gun (1986). He appeared on The Love Boat, as a young version of one of the characters in retrospection about the Second World War.

=== 1988–2001: Breakthrough and stardom ===
In 1988, Robbins portrayed pitcher Ebby Calvin "Nuke" LaLoosh in the baseball film Bull Durham (1988), in which he co-starred with Susan Sarandon and Kevin Costner. Robbins credited the film with boosting his career, adding: "when I broke through, when I became famous and didn't have to audition anymore, I would get scripts - right? - sent to me... After Bull Durham came out." However, Robbins found himself passing on numerous films because he found them to be uncomfortable propaganda that compelled a "vigilante idea of justice or this idea that violence is somehow entertainment."

Around 1991, Robbins was offered one million dollars to star in Folks! (1992), but turned it down in favor of playing the lead role of a film executive in Robert Altman's film The Player (1992). The film and Robbins' performance were acclaimed with Peter Travers in Rolling Stone declaring Robbins' work "a classic performance, mining every comic and lethal nuance in the role of his career". He won the Best Actor Award at Cannes. He made his directorial and screenwriting debut with Bob Roberts (also 1992), a mockumentary about a right-wing senatorial candidate. Todd McCarthy in Variety commented that the film is "both a stimulating social satire and, for thinking people, a depressing commentary on the devolution of the American political system". Robbins then starred alongside Morgan Freeman in The Shawshank Redemption (1994), which was based on Stephen King's novella.

Robbins has written, produced, and directed several films with strong social content, such as the capital punishment saga Dead Man Walking (1995), starring Sarandon and Sean Penn. The film earned him an Oscar nomination for Best Director. According to Roger Ebert in early 1996: "With this film he leaps far beyond" Bob Roberts "and has made that rare thing, a film that is an exercise of philosophy. This is the kind of movie that spoils us for other films, because it reveals so starkly how most movies fall into conventional routine, and lull us with the reassurance that they will not look too hard, or probe too deeply, or make us think beyond the boundaries of what is comfortable".

His next directorial effort was Depression-era musical Cradle Will Rock (1999). Robbins has also appeared in mainstream Hollywood thrillers, such as Arlington Road (also 1999) as a suspected terrorist and Antitrust (2001) as a malicious computer tycoon, and in comical films such as The Hudsucker Proxy (1994), Nothing to Lose (1997), and High Fidelity (2000). Robbins has also acted in and directed several Actors' Gang theater productions.

=== 2002–2010: Mystic River and other roles ===
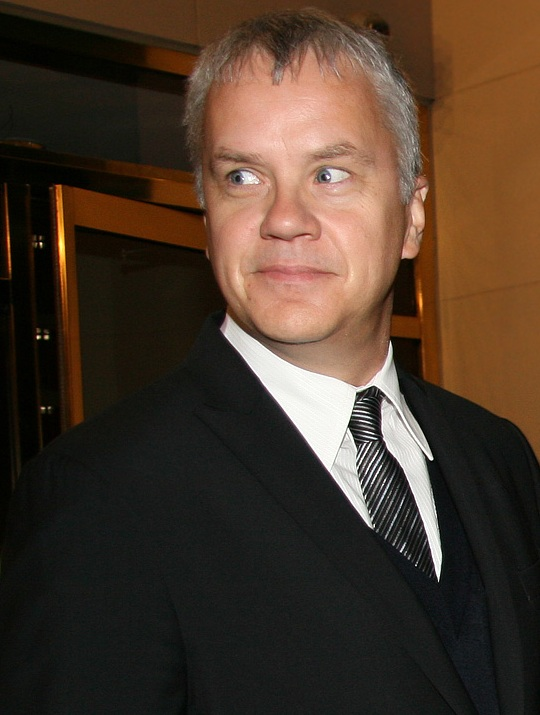
Tim Robbins at the 2008 Toronto International Film Festival

Robbins won the Academy Award for Best Supporting Actor and the SAG Award for his work in Mystic River (2003), as a man traumatized from having been kidnapped and raped as a child. He followed his Oscar win with roles as a temporarily blind man who is nursed to health by a psychologically wounded young woman in The Secret Life of Words (2005) and an apartheid torturer in Catch a Fire (2006). As of 2006, he was the tallest Academy Award-winning actor at 6 feet 5 inches (1.96 m).

In early 2006, Robbins directed an adaptation of George Orwell's novel 1984, written by Michael Gene Sullivan of the Tony Award-winning San Francisco Mime Troupe. The production opened at Actors' Gang, at their new location at The Ivy Substation in Culver City, California. In addition to venues around the United States, it has played in Athens, Greece, the Melbourne International Festival in Australia and the Hong Kong Arts Festival. Robbins was soon considering a film adaptation.

Robbins appeared in The Lucky Ones, with co-star Rachel McAdams, as well as City of Ember (both 2008).

Robbins released the album Tim Robbins & The Rogues Gallery Band (2010), a collection of songs written over the course of 25 years that he ultimately took on a world tour. He was originally offered the chance to record an album in 1992 after the success of his film Bob Roberts, but he declined because he had "too much respect for the process", having seen his father work so hard as a musician, and because he felt he had nothing to say at the time.

=== 2011–present: Streaming and television projects ===
Robbins appeared as Senator Hammond, the disapproving father of the film's villain Hector Hammond, in the superhero film Green Lantern (2011).

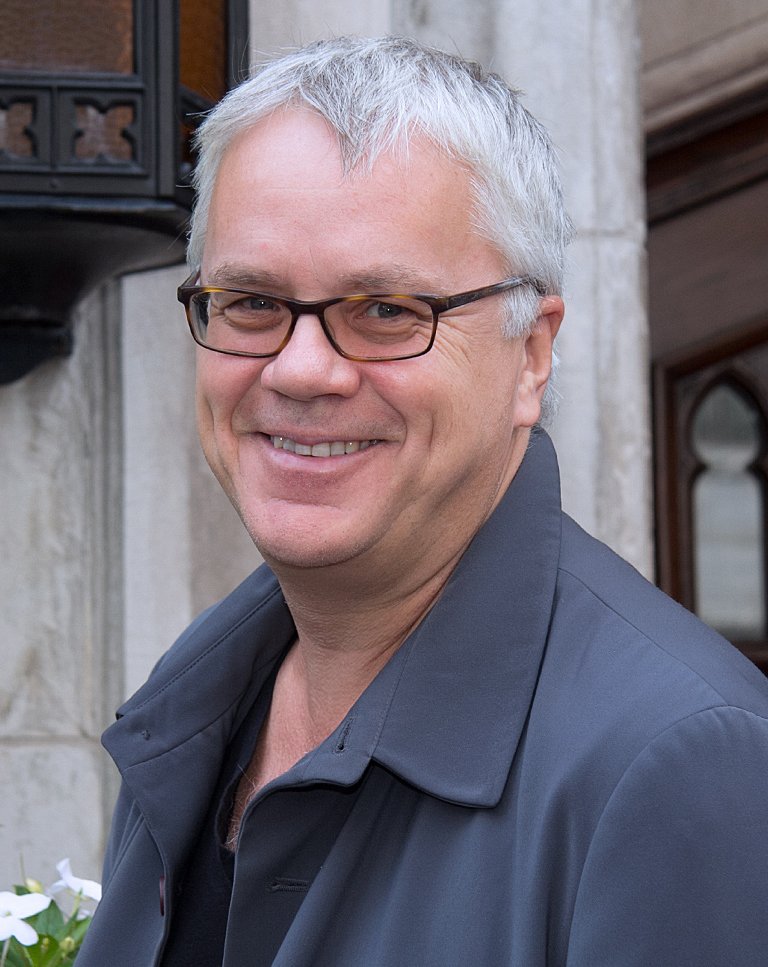
Robbins at the 2012 Toronto International Film Festival

Robbins directed two episodes of the HBO series Treme. The series follows the interconnected lives of a group of New Orleanians in the wake of Hurricane Katrina. He helmed the episodes "Everything I Do Gonh Be Funky" in season 2 (2011) and "Promised Land" in season 3 (2012). Robbins became interested in the show while staying in New Orleans during the filming of Green Lantern. "I had the unique experience of watching Treme with locals. It resonated for me immediately, and it resonated for them as well, because they have seen their town get misinterpreted and represented in ridiculous ways," he told The Times-Picayune in 2011. "Something about this show was different for them. I appreciated that. I loved the writing and the actors. I loved the environment it's set in. I watched the whole first season in New Orleans, and got in touch with David Simon and said, 'If you guys need a director next year, I'd be happy to do an episode.'"

In 2013, he was a member of the jury at the 63rd Berlin International Film Festival.

In 2023, Robbins began starring in the Apple TV series Silo. In 2024, Robbins and the Actors' Gang presented a production of his play Topsy Turvy - Ramazuri at the Csokonai National Theatre in Debrecen.

== Personal life ==
=== Marriages and family ===
In 1988, Robbins began a relationship with actress Susan Sarandon, whom he met on the set of Bull Durham. They have two sons: John Henry and Miles Robbins. Sarandon, like Robbins, is a lapsed Catholic. Robbins's relationship with Sarandon ended in December 2009. Robbins married Gratiela Brancusi on February 1, 2017. They separated on July 1, 2020. News of the marriage was kept private until Robbins filed for divorce in January 2021. The divorce was finalized in 2022.

Robbins is a lifelong New York Mets fan. "Also, my mother, for my 11th birthday, traveled out one morning to Queens to wait in line at Shea Stadium to get me tickets for the World Series. I wound up seeing, on my 11th birthday, the Mets win the World Series. That was one of the greatest things a mother could do for her son."

=== Political views ===
Robbins supported Ralph Nader's 2000 presidential campaign and appeared on stage in character as Bob Roberts during the "Nader Rocks the Garden" rally at Madison Square Garden. In December 2007, Robbins campaigned for Senator John Edwards in the 2008 U.S. presidential election. He made critical statements against Hillary Clinton and the Democratic Leadership Council while introducing Bernie Sanders at a 2016 campaign stop.

Robbins opposed the 2003 invasion of Iraq. In 2003, a 15th anniversary celebration of Bull Durham at the National Baseball Hall of Fame was canceled by Hall of Fame President Dale Petroskey. Petroskey told Robbins that his stance helped to "undermine the U.S. position, which could put our troops in even more danger". Durham co-star Kevin Costner defended Robbins and Sarandon: "I think Tim and Susan's courage is the type of courage that makes our democracy work. Pulling back this invite is against the whole principle about what we fight for and profess to be about."

In early 2023, Robbins criticized COVID-19 lockdowns and argued that strict COVID protocols should no longer be in place on film sets.
