= My Big Fat American Gypsy Wedding =

Television series

- Genre: Reality
- Starring: Sondra Celli; Mellie Stanley York; Nettie Stanley; Kayla Williams; Laura Johnston
- Narrated by: Ellen K
- Country of origin: United States
- Original language: English
- No. of seasons: 6
- No. of episodes: 48

Production
- Production location: United States
- Running time: 40 to 43 minutes
- Production company: Firecracker Films

Original release
- Network: TLC
- Release: April 29, 2012 – September 4, 2016

Related
- Big Fat Gypsy Weddings; Gypsy Sisters

Promotional image from TLC

My Big Fat American Gypsy Wedding is an American reality television series that debuted on TLC in April 2012. It claims to revolve around the marriage customs of Romani-Americans ("Gypsies") – allegedly members of Romanichal clans, although some are actually of Irish Traveller descent. It is a spin-off of Britain's Channel 4 series Big Fat Gypsy Weddings.

It was announced in June 2012 that the series had been renewed for a second season, which debuted on March 24, 2013. Season 4 premiered on April 4, 2014 and Season 5 in February 2015.

My Big Fat American Gypsy Wedding has led to a spinoff series: Gypsy Sisters (2013).

== Controversies ==
Both the British original and the American version of the series have faced a number of controversies, including allegations of racism in its advertising and causing racially motivated bullying.

The Romani Gypsy community has criticized the series for misrepresenting the ethnic minority with non-Romani characters posing as "Gypsy", and Billy Welch – a spokesman for Romani Gypsies – stated:

They called the show Big Fat Gypsy Wedding and you've yet to see a Romani Gypsy in it.

The American version of the series has faced controversy and criticism from Romani-Americans, and from journalists and activists concerned with minority rights, claiming that the series is "wildly misleading," cultivating racist stereotypes, and misrepresenting the American Romani community.

== Episodes ==
=== Series overview ===
Season	Episodes	Originally released	
Season	Episodes	First released	Last released
1	8	April 29, 2012	June 17, 2012
2	8	March 24, 2013	May 5, 2013
3	8	April 3, 2014	May 22, 2014
4	8	February 26, 2015	April 16, 2015
5	8	July 17, 2016	September 4, 2016
6	8	October 21, 2018	December 8, 2018

=== Season 1 (2012) ===
No. overall	No. in season	Title	Original release date	U.S. viewers (millions)
1	1	"Virgin Gypsy Brides"	April 29, 2012	1.68
There is no sex before marriage if you are a gypsy teenager. Two teenage girls go through different rites of passage under the watching eyes of their protective mothers. Hope's extravagant 15th birthday party and the wedding of Shyanne (17).
2	2	"14 and Looking for Mr. Right"	May 6, 2012	1.68
Priscilla, a 14 year old gypsy girl, is a fully trained gypsy wife. Now all she needs is a husband... Priscilla's family spends big money on a Sondra Celli dress in the hopes to find a suitable gypsy bachelor.
3	3	"It's a Man's World"	May 13, 2012	1.58
A look at how a gypsy man rules the roost. Tommy teaches his non- gypsy bride her role in gypsy society. While proud gypsy dad, Ed, has to earn an extra $10,000 to pay for his 4-year-old's carnival birthday party.
4	4	"Wild Gypsy Mellie"	May 20, 2012	1.30
The life of a Romanichal gypsy housewife revealed as four women throw a raucous gypsy family thanksgiving reunion, a gypsy divorcee remarries, and one gypsy girl rebels against the traditions.
5	5	"Murphy's Secret Village"	May 27, 2012	1.34
A teenage bride-to-be struggles to master a secret society's traditions in a bid for their acceptance. We also meet the one West Virginia Romanichal clan who are also getting ready for a new addition to the family by throwing a baby shower, Gypsy-style.
6	6	"Showdown at the Altar"	June 3, 2012	1.88
In this gypsy tale of Romeo and Juliet, star-crossed lovers Heath and Alyssa defy both sets of parents to have their dream wedding. The problem is Heath's Aunt Mellie is prepared to use excessive violence to stop them from becoming husband and wife.
7	7	"Kissing Cousins"	June 10, 2012	1.54
Gypsy Annie marries her first cousin with the most blingtastic winter wonderland ceremony and an outrageous fox fur wedding dress. In Ohio, Ana follows her heart but breaks all the rules in the first gay gypsy wedding.
8	8	"Blingtastic Baptism"	June 17, 2012	1.48
JR and Nettie eloped as teenagers and got married against their parents' wishes. Now, 14 years later, JR is making an honest gypsy housewife of Nettie as he gives her the biggest wedding dress in West Virginia.

=== Season 2 (2013) ===
No. overall	No. in season	Title	Original release date	U.S. viewers (millions)
9	1	"Gypsy Traditions and Superstitions"	March 24, 2013	1.25
Families turn hostile when gypsy teens from different clans bypass important traditions at their wedding. A young gypsy pageant princess is determined not to let any gorgers steal her crown. Former criminal turned pastor seeks a wife for his Roma son.
10	2	"Double Wedding, Double Trouble!"	March 31, 2013	0.78
Two best friends plan their double gypsy wedding until one mother-in-law does all she can to stop her son from marrying outside the gypsy bloodline. Romney twins celebrate their 18th birthday; one plays the field, while the other searches for a wife.
11	3	"Don't Mess with the Nest"	April 7, 2013	1.04
A gorger girl plans to marry her gypsy man for the second time. But his mom is less than impressed that her son would take back his non-gypsy ex-wife. A gypsy teen must choose between her divorced parents after an elaborate party is thrown on her behalf.
12	4	"She's Out of There, She's Got to Go!"	April 14, 2013	1.34
A Gorger bride seeks her future gypsy mother in-law's approval. America's most notorious gypsy ex-con longs for forgiveness from her family after years behind bars. A gypsy teen breaks away from tradition to pursue her dreams of stardom.
13	5	"Loud Proud Gypsies"	April 21, 2013	0.81
Outcast from their community, a family plans a christening with gypsy flare to reclaim their place in society. A gay gypsy couple breaks all the rules by getting married despite discrimination. An on-again couple finds love for the second time around.
14	6	"Feuding Families and Broken Hearts"	April 28, 2013	1.02
Two notorious gypsy families, the Boswells and the Smalls, have been feuding with each other for years. But when one decides to crash the other's party- all bets are off. A young gypsy teen must decide whether or not to stay with her man.
15	7	"All Bets Are Off"	May 5, 2013	1.36
A young groom plans an extravagant, gypsy-style wedding for his fiancée in Vegas. But their love is tested when he spends their first night in town living it up in the "city of sin". And a gypsy bad boy refuses to settle down with his pregnant girlfriend.
16	8	"Love Is a Battlefield"	May 5, 2013	1.37
Four gypsy teens looking for love, prepare for the biggest Romanichal ball of the year. But every girl has her secrets. And if these secrets surface and threaten their reputations, they jeopardize their chances of meeting their perfect gypsy prince.

=== Season 3 (2014) ===
No. overall	No. in season	Title	Original release date	U.S. viewers (millions)
-	-	"Most Blingtastic Moments"	April 3, 2014	0.82
17	1	"A Love Worth Fighting For"	April 3, 2014	0.99
In the third-season premiere, two teens from feuding families will do whatever it takes to get married, even though their mothers are standing in the way. Also: A boy hopes to make history as a Jiu Jitsu champion.
18	2	"Big Dreams, Bigger Problems"	April 10, 2014	N/A
Two Romanichal sisters plan their double gypsy wedding while their mother tries to prevent them from marrying outside the gypsy bloodline. An Irish traveller pursues his dream of becoming America's first gypsy rapper.
19	3	"Wed at First Sight"	April 17, 2014	1.12
A young couple has found love online and plan to meet for the very first time on their wedding day! Breaking free from traditional gypsy roles, a young rising rodeo star hopes that her skills in the saddle will earn her a college scholarship.
20	4	"Caught in a Gypsy Love Triangle"	April 24, 2014	1.10
A bride-to-be has two suitors and a bridesmaid with a nasty disposition; a teen wants to be the first gypsy supermodel.
21	5	"You've Got to Fight for Your Right...to Marry"	May 1, 2014	0.95
A Romanichal man plans his wedding to his gorger fiancée but a jealous ex-lover will stop at nothing to prevent the union. A gypsy teen finally gets her big break in the music industry, but will she turn her back on stardom for love?
22	6	"Nukkie and Pookie Say I Do"	May 8, 2014	1.09
A family feud threatens to undermine a couple's wedding; an ex-convict tries to start a new life.
23	7	"Wedded to Disaster"	May 15, 2014	1.05
Two gypsy sweethearts, finally plan their long awaited wedding despite their mother's disapproval. But with the grudge now spreading to other family members, can their feud ever be put to rest? Later, an ex-con gypsy mom tries to put her past behind her.
24	8	"The Masquerade Ball"	May 22, 2014	0.93

=== Season 4 (2015) ===
No. overall	No. in season	Title	Original release date	U.S. viewers (millions)
25	1	"The Greek Goddess and the Giant Gown"	February 26, 2015	N/A
A Greek gypsy bride-to-be sets out to make history in the biggest, blinged-out wedding dress ever made! Later, it's a clash amongst the generations when a gypsy teen's sweet 16 party is derailed by her over-bearing traditional grandmother.
26	2	"When Bridesmaids Go Bad"	March 5, 2015	N/A
Nettie's son is getting married, but is wary of asking his sister Dallas to be in the wedding, since her wild behavior could ruin the occasion. Meanwhile, a Romany teen hosts a family affair that could result in a marriage proposal.
27	3	"From Jail to Wedding Veil"	March 12, 2015	N/A
A strict Gypsy mom lays down the law by arranging a marriage in an attempt to tame her 16 year-old daughter's wild ways. Later, the arrival of a Romanichal baby sparks a family war over ancient gypsy traditions.
28	4	"Gypsy Jinxes and Wedding Hijinks"	March 19, 2015	N/A
Gypsy sisters plan to marry their gorger fiancés in a double wedding, but a jealous sister-in-law could ruin their big day. Meanwhile, a superstitious couple fear their wedding is cursed.
29	5	"So I Married my Ex-Babysitter..."	March 26, 2015	0.96
When a young gypsy man marries his ex-babysitter, the couple adds fire to a family feud that dates back to over 30 years. Later, a progressive gypsy woman defies her traditional Romanichal mom by marrying a gorger.
30	6	"Rituals, Rules and the Ultimate Gypsy Test"	April 2, 2015	N/A
A traditional gypsy mom demands that her daughter perform a series of ancient rituals to determine if she's ready to wed. Later, a gypsy teen plans to marry a gorger bad-boy against her families wishes.
31	7	"A Romney Rebel Returns"	April 9, 2015	N/A
A Gypsy woman marries a gorger, but their families aren't too thrilled about it; a Gypsy mother tries to make up for being absent from her twin daughters' lives by throwing them a lavish birthday party when they turn 18.
32	8	"The Gypsy Ball: A Night to Remember"	April 16, 2015	N/A
Four gypsy teens looking for love prepare for the most anticipated event of the year - the annual Gypsy Ball. But no gypsy affair is ever complete without a ton of family drama!

=== Season 5 (2016) ===
No. overall	No. in season	Title	Original release date	U.S. viewers (millions)
33	1	"Rotting Dresses and Candy Messes"	July 17, 2016	N/A
Gypsy teen Maquayla can't wait to wear her dream wedding gown, but disaster strikes when a dead dress arrives for her big day! Mom plans to use Yazzie's Sweet 16 party to marry her off, but it's all-out war when her gorger boyfriend makes an appearance.
34	2	"Double Wedding From Hell"	July 24, 2016	N/A
Gypsy BFFs Amber and Stefanie are planning a double wedding, but a jealous cousin will stop at nothing to hijack the big day and steal back Amber's fiancé! Gypsy wrestler Priscilla's birthday may turn into a cage match if her father shows up uninvited.
35	3	"Gypsy Mamas Gone Mad"	July 31, 2016	N/A
Gypsy goth rocker Tuter goes to war with her glamorous and bling-loving mother, Jacy, when Mom refuses to let her marry in an all-black wedding gown! And a pushy "momager" will stop at nothing to have her gypsy child pageant star, Kylei Jo, crowned queen.
36	4	"Mama Said Knock You Out"	August 7, 2016	N/A
Gypsy Trouble and her gorger fiancé may not have their dream biker-themed wedding because of their fierce, feuding mothers. And Alanna's traditional 8th birthday party spirals into an epic battle between her American and Russian gypsy family members.
37	5	"Welcome to Hillbilly Hell"	August 14, 2016	N/A
A woman's 21st birthday gives her a chance to flaunt her flashy style again after surviving a terrible accident; a woman's Cherokee boyfriend must win her mother's approval before their relationship can proceed.
38	6	"Gypsy Princesses on the Prowl"	August 21, 2016	N/A
It's the fairytales Gypsy ball, and all Gypsy princesses want to find their princes charming, but of course it won't be easy because some princesses have protective siblings who will tried everything to ruin their chance at true love.
39	7	"You Don't Know Gypsy!"	August 28, 2016	N/A
A wannabe bride must prove her mettle to the community by enduring an ancient humiliating ritual.
40	8	"An American Gypsy in Romania"	September 4, 2016	N/A

=== Season 6 (2018) ===
No. overall	No. in season	Title	Original release date	U.S. viewers (millions)
41	1	"Gypsy-Gorger Love Triangle"	October 21, 2018	N/A
Cearia is trapped in a love triangle with her non-gypsy fiancé and cousin.
42	2	"Gypsy Sisters Bridal Brawl"	October 27, 2018	N/A
The Stanley family returns and Nukkie is engaged to a gorger
43	3	"You're Getting Married"	November 3, 2018	N/A
Nukkie and Jonas' wedding may be in jeopardy when an ex re-emerges.
44	4	"Not Marrying a Jailbird!"	November 10, 2018	N/A
Jett and Bubba rush to get married, but her mom seeks to end the union.
45	5	"After Rain Comes the Rainbow"	November 17, 2018	N/A
Samantha can't wait to marry her fiancée, but her sister may ruin the day.
46	6	"Gorger Parents Fight Back"	November 24, 2018	N/A
A disapproving mom threatens to wreak havoc on a couple's wedding day.
47	7	"Don't Marry Ex-husbands"	December 1, 2018	N/A
Karen's sister and mom refuse to let her marry her sister's ex-husband.
48	8	"Reverse the Gypsy Curse"	December 8, 2018	N/A
Brittany plans a gypsy funeral for her late father to reverse their curse.

=== Specials ===
Title	Original release date	U.S. viewers (millions)
"The Stanley Sisters"	July 1, 2012	1.23
This special revolves specifically around the Stanley Sisters: Kayla, Nettie, Mellie, and sister-in-law Laura. Nettie is struggling with her younger sister Mellie working at a strip club, believing it shames the family. Nettie is also worried about her 14-year-old daughter, Nukkie, running off to Princeton, West Virginia with a 17-year-old boy named Pookie, and tries to hunt her down but ends up with her daughter, Dallas, and Kayla quarreling with Pookie's family. Kayla is busy planning her son's baptism party. Laura helps Nettie look for Nukkie. Mellie is angry when Nettie and her daughter-in-law Lottie come to her workplace and confront her about working at the strip club.
"The Aftermath"	July 1, 2012	1.14
All of the Stanley sisters convene to discuss the past season. The first topic on the table was the aftermath of Heath and Alyssa's wedding. Mellie explains that she hates Alyssa and wants to attack but rises above the situation and pretends that she does not exist. Nettie states that Alyssa is welcome to be a Stanley but claims Alyssa is spreading false information about her. Alyssa declines the invitation to the reunion but is given an exclusive interview to express herself to the Stanleys. Heath and Alyssa's marriage lasted a month, Alyssa moved back in with her parents to take care of her baby boy. Alyssa feels Heath is a bad influence on her son thus the reason for the divorce. Later, the girls pick out their favorite wedding dresses that have been worn throughout Season 1. Nettie and Nukkie have reconciled so Nukkie now lives with her mom again. Nettie accepts Pookie and agrees to let them date as long as it leads to marriage. Nettie and Mellie's relationship is tested with the aftermath of the confrontation regarding Mellie working as a stripper. Ellen K declares the reunion as one "Big Fat American Gypsy Wild Ride".
