= Voice of Roma =

The Voice of Roma is an advocacy and human rights group, founded in 1996, for Roma people based in America, with projects across the US and Europe, most notably in Kosovo. It was founded by Sani Rifati in 1996, and incorporated as a 501(c) 3 non-profit organization in Sebastopol, California in 1999.

== Publishing ==
VOR have published a number of pamphlets by activist Paul Polansky.

== Broadcasting ==
They are running a Romany language radio station from Belgrade called "Khrlo e Romengo" – "Voice of Roma"

== Board ==
According to their website, the current board is:

=== Board of directors ===
- Sani Rifati, President
- Bruce Cochran
- Kristin Raeesi
- Carol Silverman, PhD
- Petra Gelbart
- Merrilyn Joyce

=== VOR International Advisory Board ===
- Enisa Eminova
- Danny Fryer
- Ian Hancock
- Marie Pierre Lahaye
- Rev. Richard Ramsey
- Dragan Ristic
- Dusan Ristic
