= Sani Rifati =

Human rights activist and the President of Voice of Roma

Sani Rifati is a human rights activist and the President of Voice of Roma.

A native Roma himself, he was born in Pristina, Kosovo, Yugoslavia, lived and worked in California, United States. He currently resides in Berlin, Germany.

Rifati began dancing as a youth in Pristina and was a part of the 'Kheljen Romalen!' Folklore Dance Ensemble. During the 1980s, he was a drummer for a professional band. He has worked as Romani dance instructor and choreographer. Since 2012 he has worked as a Roma-dance teacher at the refugee dance group Heimatsterne of the Arbeitsgruppe Flucht+Menschenrechte in Berlin.

Rifati is a cousin of the Macedonian Gypsy vocalist and dancer Esma Redzhepova as well as being her tour manager. He has also managed Ivo Papasov, Yuri Yunakov, and Kal.

He appeared on the History Channels programme Curse on the Gypsies.
