= Gypsy Sisters =

American reality television series

- Genre: Reality
- Starring: Mellie Stanley; Nettie Stanley; Sheila "Kayla" Williams; Angela "Annie" Williams; JoAnn Wells; Dovie Carter; Sheena Small; Laura Johnston
- Country of origin: United States
- Original language: English
- No. of seasons: 4
- No. of episodes: 31

Production
- Running time: 40–43 minutes
- Production company: Firecracker Films

Original release
- Network: TLC
- Release: February 10, 2013 – July 19, 2015

Related
- My Big Fat American Gypsy Wedding

Gypsy Sisters is an American reality television series on TLC. The series debuted on February 10, 2013. It follows the daily life of Romanichal women located in Martinsburg, West Virginia. The series serves as a spin off to its sister show My Big Fat American Gypsy Wedding. The second season premiered on December 5, 2013. The third season premiered August 21, 2014. The fourth season premiered on May 31, 2015. TLC officially cancelled the series on July 30, 2015 due to low ratings, the passing of Nettie's stepson, Rocky, and the murder of Mellie's dog. In March 2025, Kayla and Annie announced their podcast, “Gossiping Gypsy Sisters”, where they react to the series and provide their commentary, thoughts, and behind the scenes scoop.

== Cast ==
- Nettie Stanley (Season 1 - Season 4), Nettie is the matriarch of the family. The self-proclaimed mother hen of her gypsy girls. Nettie is the daughter of Lottie Mae Stanley, a Gypsy who was regular on America’s Most Wanted through the last three decades. Sisters to Joann Wells, Mellie Stanley, Dovie Carter, Tanya and Brandi and cousins to Shiela “Kayla” Williams, Annie Williams and Laura Johnston. Nettie is married to her third husband, paver Huey Stanley and has nine children; Albert “Whitey”, Heath, Destiny (deceased), Dallas, Nettie “Nukkie”, Chasitie “Mader”, Huey, Shiela and Katheryn “Kat”. Along with being a mother of nine, Nettie cares for her husband, younger sister Mellie, nieces, nephews and grandchildren through the series. Her and her family have appeared on many episodes of My Big Fat American Gypsy Wedding prior to filming Gypsy Sisters. After some issues in her personal life, and losing her stepson Rocky, in a violent event, she left TV behind to raise her family out of the spotlight. In January 2023, Nettie and Huey Stanley were arrested for conspiracy and fraudulent scheming.
- Mellie Stanley (Season 1 - Season 4), Mellie is Nettie, Dovie and Joann's younger sister. Known as the black sheep of the family, Mellie wants to break away from the gypsy lifestyle. She is now a single mother of four children; son Richard Joe Whetzel Stanley (born in 2013, with ex-husband Robbie York), daughter Brandy Wyne Leveniya Picolo (born January 2015 with Nik Picolo), daughter Divinity Rose Lee (born November 2016, with ex-husband George Lee Jr.) and daughter Serenity Faye West (born March 2020, with partner MJ West). In 2017, Mellie along with then husband George Lee, was arrested for an $18,000 Toys R' Us and Babies R' Us coupon fraud scam. She was sentenced to five years probation in 2019, with the requirement she would have to obtain her G.E.D in that time.
- Joann Wells (Season 2 - Season 4), Mellie, Dovie and Nettie's sister. She has two kids and has recently separated from her husband of thirteen years. She's the good natured one of the bunch. In season 3, she announced she had plans to divorce her husband. In 2016, Joann reconciled with her husband, Belcher however the two later split and she remarried. Joann was arrested in 2014 for a $14,000 Target coupon fraud scam. She later pleaded guilty and was sentenced to 24 months supervised probation in lieu of 6 to 17 months in prison, and ordered to pay Target back $14,786 in restitution.
- Sheila "Kayla" Williams (Season 1 - Season 4) Annie's sister. She has five children: Danielle, Kayla (Sissy), Richard, Lexi, and George. Kayla and her husband of seventeen years, Richard, are now divorced. Kayla was briefly married to Adam Prather before they divorced and she is now married to Benny Small. She is now a grandmother as her daughter Danielle has two daughters with her husband George, and her daughter Sissy has two sons and a daughter with her husband Bruce. Her ex-husband Richard has two sons with Danielle Malone (sister to James Malone, the father of Dallas’ daughters, and Annie's ex husband).
- Angela "Annie" Malone (Season 2 - Season 4), Kayla's sister. Annie has five kids but still has plenty of growing up to do. Annie is playful and fun and always makes the other girls laugh with her silly antics. After her Big Fat Gypsy wedding to her cousin Josh failed, Annie married James Malone, the father of her cousin Dallas' children. Jay and Annie divorced and she has since remarried.
- Dovie Carter (Season 4) Nettie, Mellie, and Joann's sister. Dovie is the family peacemaker and is like Joann.
- Laura Johnston (Season 1), Kayla's and Annie's sister-in-law. Laura married into the gypsy clan when she married Kayla and Annie's brother Gus. Together they have three daughters Savannah, Hailey and Bella.
- Sheena Small (Season 2), First cousin to Mellie, Nettie, JoAnn, Dovie, Kayla and Annie. She was formerly married to Mellie and Nettie's brother Henry. Together they have four girls; Shakira, Shania, Shirley, and Frankie.
- Dallas Nichole Williams (multiple seasons) Nettie's oldest daughter, and mother of Demi, Richard, London, Aaron, Archie, and Huey. As of Christmas time 2016, she was once again reconciled with James Malone, much to his wife's - (Dallas' cousin) chagrin. The reconciliation between Dallas and Jay was short lived, he has since left her.
- Nettie "Nuckie" Williams (multiple seasons) After a marriage that produced one child, Prince Henry, Nuckie left Pookie and her son to travel the roads and see the world with her heroin addict boyfriend. As of December 2016, she had been found by Pookie and Samantha and returned to her mother at long last. Samantha later left Pookie in February and filed divorce and in March Pookie, went on to pursue a relationship with Nuckie again, they welcomed their second child together, a daughter named Ivory born November 2017, and another daughter Delilah Dee, born in 2019.

== Episodes ==
=== Series overview ===
Season	Episodes	Originally released	
Season	Episodes	First released	Last released
1	6	February 10, 2013	March 17, 2013
2	8	December 5, 2013	January 9, 2014
3	8	August 21, 2014	October 2, 2014
4	8	May 31, 2015	July 19, 2015

=== Season 1 (2013) ===
No. overall	No. in season	Title	Original release date	U.S. viewers (millions)
1	1	"Blood Is Thicker Than Bling (aka Highway to Hell)"	February 10, 2013	1.16
2	2	"The Queen of All Cons"	February 10, 2013	1.16
3	3	"Last Fling Before the Ring"	February 17, 2013	1.11
4	4	"Wedded for Disaster"	March 3, 2013	1.07
5	5	"Who's Your Daddy?"	March 10, 2013	1.20
6	6	"All Is Fair in Gypsy War"	March 17, 2013	1.41

=== Season 2 (2013–14) ===
No. overall	No. in season	Title	Original release date	U.S. viewers (millions)
7	1	"The Calm Before The Storm"	December 5, 2013	1.06
8	2	"Fist of Fury"	December 5, 2013	1.06
9	3	"The Blame Game"	December 12, 2013	0.83
10	4	"Making Up is Hard to Do"	December 19, 2013	0.87
11	5	"A Newborn King"	December 26, 2013	1.51
12	6	"The Family That Plays Together, Stays Together"	January 2, 2014	1.13
13	7	"Gypsies Unleashed"	January 9, 2014	1.20
14	8	"It's Been One Long, Hot Summer"	January 9, 2014	1.20

=== Season 3 (2014) ===
No. overall	No. in season	Title	Original release date	U.S. viewers (millions)
15	1	"Birthdays, Brawls, and Big Reveals"	August 21, 2014	N/A
16	2	"Off to the Races...Again!"	August 28, 2014	N/A
17	3	"Bottoms Up in the Big Easy"	August 28, 2014	N/A
18	4	"Bourbon Street Brawls"	September 4, 2014	N/A
19	5	"The Little Gypsy Prince Turns 1"	September 11, 2014	N/A
20	6	"A Marriage Unraveling"	September 18, 2014	N/A
21	7	"Gypsy Sisters"	September 25, 2014	N/A
22	8	"Surprise at the Altar"	October 2, 2014	N/A

=== Season 4 (2015) ===
No. overall	No. in season	Title	Original release date	U.S. viewers (millions)
23	1	"The Name That Started A War"	May 31, 2015	N/A
24	2	"Dirty Little Secrets: Exposed!"	June 7, 2015	N/A
25	3	"Desperate Times Call For Desperate Measures"	June 14, 2015	N/A
26	4	"A Drum, a Rattle, and a Gypsy Battle"	June 21, 2015	N/A
27	5	"On the Ranch, Off the Rails!"	June 28, 2015	N/A
29	6	"The Call that Changed It All"	July 5, 2015	N/A
29	7	"The First Ladies of Bling Take DC!"	July 12, 2015	N/A
30	8	"Wildest, Craziest, OMG Moments"	July 19, 2015	N/A

=== Christmas Special ===
No.	Title	Original release date
S–01	"A Naughty or Nice Christmas?"	December 11, 2014
