= Gratiela Brancusi =

Romanian actress (born 1989)

- Born: Ioana Grațiela Brâncuși; 23 July 1989 (age 36); Timișoara, Romania
- Occupation(s): Actress, Photographer
- Years active: 2021–present
- Spouse: Tim Robbins (m. 2017; div. 2022)

Grațiela Brâncuși (born 23 July 1989) is a Romanian actress, based in the United States. She is known for her debut role as Noemi in the Paramount+ limited-run series 1883 (2021–2022) and Tatiana in Mayor of Kingstown (2023).

== Early life and education ==
Ioana Grațiela Brâncuși was born in Timișoara, Romania, on 23 July 1989. She is the great-grand-niece of Constantin Brâncuși. Brancuși was raised by her mother after her parents' divorce. Her sister is eleven years older than she is. Brancuși is Romani on her father's side. She moved to Los Angeles.

She studied Journalism at the University of Bucharest and is a member of The Actors’ Gang Theater Ensemble.

== Career ==
Brâncuși made her debut in theaters. However, after the COVID-19 pandemic and lockdowns, she started auditioning. In December 2021, Brâncuși was announced as Noemi, a Romani widow, in Paramount+ limited-run series 1883. A year later she signed with Elevate Entertainment for management in all areas.

In September 2022, it was announced that Brâncuși joined the Mayor of Kingstown cast for the second season. It premiered on January 15, 2023.

== Personal life ==
Brâncuși married Tim Robbins on February 1, 2017. They separated on July 1, 2020. The marriage was kept private until Robbins filed for divorce in January 2021. The divorce was finalized in 2022.

Apart from acting, she has an interest in photography and reading.

== Filmography ==
=== Television ===
Year	Title	Role	Notes	Ref.
2021–2022	1883	Noemi	Recurring role; 10 episodes	
2023–2024	Mayor of Kingstown	Tatiana	Recurring role; 6 episodes	
