= Oksana Marafioti =

American-Romani writer

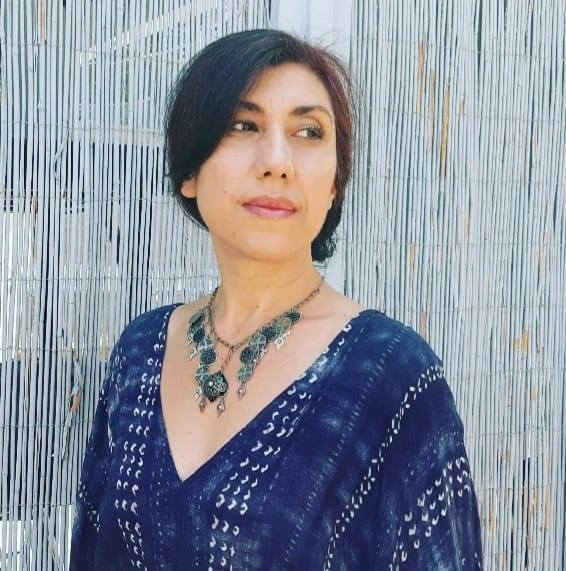
- Oksana Marafioti
- Born: Oksana Kopylenko; 1974 (age 51–52); Riga, Soviet Latvia
- Website: oksana-marafioti.com

Oksana Marafioti (née Kopylenko, born 1974) is an American writer and educator of Romani and Armenian descent. She is the author of American Gypsy: A Memoir (Farrar, Straus and Giroux, 2012), which has been translated into Czech.

== Early life ==
Marafioti was born in Riga, Latvia in 1974 to a Greek-Armenian mother and a Ukrainian Romani father. Although she officially had residence in Moscow, she had a largely nomadic childhood, with her parents performing as part of a travelling circus owned by her paternal grandparents. She learned to speak Romanes, Armenian, and Russian. At age 15, she and her family emigrated to the United States.

== Career ==
Marafioti holds a BA in Film and an MFA in Creative Writing. She is also a classically trained pianist and has studied music, film, and literature in both the United States and Europe.

Her works have appeared in Slate, Time, Immigrant Voices Vol.II (Penguin Random House, 2015), The Los Angeles Times, The Rumpus, and numerous anthologies, and has been featured on NPR, C‑SPAN, and various international media outlets.

Along with many interviews and panel appearances, Oksana has presented her research on Magical Realism In Soviet Russia at the Library of Congress in 2013 and participated in the C-SPAN panel discussion on race and ethnicity in 2015.

In addition to her writing, Marafioti is a frequent speaker on topics related to creative writing, minority representation, and inclusive storytelling.

=== Awards and fellowships ===
She was the recipient of the Library of Congress Kluge Fellowship in 2012–2013 and has presented her research at institutions including the Library of Congress, Columbia University, Harvard University, and Central European University. In 2020, she was awarded the Picador Guest Professorship in Literature and American Studies at the University of Leipzig in Germany. She has received additional fellowships and grants from the National Endowment for the Arts and the Nevada Arts Council.

== Personal life ==
Marafioti has two sons.
