= Bob Roberts =

1992 film by Tim Robbins

- Theatrical release poster
- Directed by: Tim Robbins
- Written by: Tim Robbins
- Produced by: Forrest Murray
- Starring: Tim Robbins; Giancarlo Esposito; Ray Wise; Gore Vidal; John Cusack; Peter Gallagher; Alan Rickman; Susan Sarandon; James Spader; Fred Ward
- Cinematography: Jean Lépine
- Edited by: Lisa Churgin
- Music by: David Robbins
- Production companies: Miramax Films; PolyGram Filmed Entertainment; Working Title Films; Live Entertainment; Bob Roberts Company
- Distributed by: Paramount Pictures (North America); Rank Film Distributors (United Kingdom); PolyGram Filmed Entertainment (international)
- Release date: September 4, 1992
- Running time: 104 minutes
- Countries: United Kingdom; United States
- Language: English
- Budget: $3.9 million
- Box office: $8 million

Bob Roberts is a 1992 satirical mockumentary film written, directed by, and starring Tim Robbins. It depicts the rise of Robert "Bob" Roberts Jr., a right-wing politician who is a candidate for an upcoming United States Senate election. Roberts is well financed, due mainly to past business dealings, and is well known for his folk music, which presents conservative ideas with gusto. Many of the scenes mimic scenes from Dont Look Back.

The film is Robbins' directorial debut and is based on a short segment of the same title, featuring the same character that Robbins portrayed on Saturday Night Live. It marked Jack Black's film debut.

== Plot ==
Bob Roberts depicts a fictitious senatorial race between a conservative Republican folk singer, Bob Roberts, and the incumbent Democrat, Brickley Paiste in Pennsylvania in 1990. Terry Manchester, a British documentary filmmaker, follows the Roberts campaign as he travels across the state to sing about drug users, lazy people and the triumph of traditional family values and laissez-faire capitalism over the rebelliousness and social justice causes of the 1960s. The campaign team avoids public manifestation of open bigotry while their songs, speech and mannerisms are rife with snobbish dog whistles, racist and sexist innuendos, and casual use of homophobic slurs.

Senator Paiste is convinced that Roberts is a master manipulator linked to the National Security Council, the CIA and the military–industrial complex. Investigative reporter Bugs Raplin tries to use the documentary to expose him to the public as a fraud. Raplin believes that Roberts' anti-drug charity, Broken Dove, is connected to an old CIA drug trafficking scheme, citing Roberts' campaign chairman Lukas Hart III's past in the Phoenix Program as proof. Shortly after a contentious and disastrous interview with Roberts, television anchor Kelly Noble observes that his potential for success lies in subverting stereotypes: using music, traditionally a vehicle for left-wing protest during the counterculture years, to promote far-right politics.

Paiste remains ahead in the polls until a scandal involving a young woman seen emerging from a car with him. Roberts' campaign suffers when Raplin's accusations briefly gain traction and result in a subpoena of Lukas Hart III for unpaid housing loans rumored to be redirected to drug trafficking.

Roberts appears on a television sketch comedy show, and unexpectedly performs a song whose lyrics are a transparently partisan campaign endorsement. An angry network staffer cuts the feed mid-performance. Roberts is shot by a would-be assassin as he leaves the studio. Raplin is initially linked to the shooting, but cleared by the revelation that constrictive palsy in his right hand would prevent him from firing a gun. Raplin contends that Roberts was never actually shot and that the gun was fired into the ground. Roberts campaign staffer Delores Perrigrew is questioned by Manchester and abruptly quits the campaign.

Support for Roberts' campaign increases following the assassination attempt and he wins the election with 52% of the vote. Roberts claims he was left paralyzed from the waist down, but he's seen tapping his feet at a celebration party. While Terry Manchester is interviewing Roberts' supporters outside the new senator-elect's hotel, a boy runs up shouting that Bugs Raplin has been killed. As his supporters celebrate Raplin's murder by a right-wing fanatic, Roberts visits the Jefferson Memorial and reads the inscription there: "I have sworn upon the altar of God eternal hostility against every form of tyranny over the mind of man."

== Cast ==
- Tim Robbins as Robert "Bob" Roberts Jr., a folksinger and businessman who runs for the U.S. Senate
- Giancarlo Esposito as John Alijah "Bugs" Raplin, a journalist determined to expose Roberts
- Ray Wise as Chet MacGregor, Roberts' campaign manager
- Gore Vidal as Senator Brickley Paiste, the incumbent Senator against whom Roberts campaigns
- John Cusack as Cutting Edge Live Host
- Peter Gallagher as Dan Riley, host of Good Morning, Philadelphia
- Alan Rickman as Lukas Hart III, Roberts' campaign chairman
- Susan Sarandon as Tawna Titan, a local news anchor for WFAC-TV News
- James Spader as Chuck Marlin, a local news anchor for station WLNO
- Fred Ward as Chip Daley, co-anchor at WFAC-TV News
- Brian Murray as Terry Manchester, a British documentary film-maker
- Rebecca Jenkins as Delores Perrigrew, a member of Roberts' campaign staff
- Harry Lennix as Franklin Dockett, a Roberts campaign aide
- Robert Stanton as Bart Macklerooney, a Roberts campaign aide
- Kelly Willis as Clarissa Flan, a folk musician and Miss Broken Dove 1989
- Tom Atkins as Dr. Caleb Menck, Roberts' personal doctor
- David Strathairn as Mack Laflin, Raplin's attorney
- Pamela Reed as Carol Cruise, Chuck Marlin's co-anchor at WLNO
- Helen Hunt as Rose Pondell, a field reporter at WLNO
- Lynne Thigpen as Kelly Noble, an interviewer on Good Morning, Philadelphia
- Bingo O'Malley as Robert Roberts Sr.
- Kathleen Chalfant as Constance Roberts, Bob Roberts' mother
- Matt McGrath as Burt, a friend and bandmate of Davis
- Jack Black as Roger Davis, a fan of Roberts' music and politics (film debut)
- Anita Gillette as Mrs. Davis, wife of the mayor of Harrisburg, mother of Roger
- Fisher Stevens as Rock Bork, a field reporter at WFAC-TV News
- Bob Balaban as Michael Janes, Cutting Edge Live producer
- Allan F. Nicholls as Cutting Edge Live Director
- Robert Hegyes as Ernesto Galleano, a reporter
- Steve Pink as An Angry Penn State Protester
- Jeremy Piven as Candle Seller
- Shira Piven as Penn State Protester
- Lee Arenberg as Religious Zealot

== Style ==
The film's style is drawn from a number of real and mock documentaries, and its shots are crafted to create this effect, in many cases through the use of hand-held cameras. Not only does Roberts' character draw from 1960s-era iconography of Bob Dylan, it also contains scenes inspired by the 1967 documentary, Dont Look Back, made about the singer, employing a similar cinema verité style. Bob Roberts also draws from Rob Reiner's 1984 mockumentary This Is Spinal Tap, which Robbins states is one of his favorite films, and directly references this during the scene in which Roberts gets lost in an auditorium attempting to find the stage before his performance. In the case of Gore Vidal's character, the majority of the lines were not scripted, and instead Vidal based his role upon his own political beliefs, and his real-life positions on many of the fictional election topics.

A soundtrack album was not released because Robbins did not wish the songs to be heard outside the context of the film.

== Reception and legacy ==
On Rotten Tomatoes, the film has a score of 93% based on 44 reviews, with an average rating of 7.5/10. Its consensus reads: "Behind and in front of the camera, Tim Robbins delivers a landslide comedic victory with Bob Roberts – a shrewdly crackling lampoon of modern politics." On Metacritic, the film has a weighted average score of 70% based on reviews from 26 critics, indicating "generally favorable" reviews. Audiences surveyed by CinemaScore gave the film a grade B+ on scale of A to F.

Roger Ebert gave the film three out of four stars, stating: "I like Bob Roberts – I like its audacity, its freedom to say the obvious things about how our political process has been debased." However, Ebert also stated that the thread about the investigative journalism doesn't work, commenting "if [the film] had been only about campaign tactics and techniques, I would have liked it more."

While critics and audiences responded to this film by connecting Roberts’ character to various political figures, such as George H. W. Bush and Pennsylvania Representative and later Senator Rick Santorum, Robbins has said that the film related more to the political system in general than any specific politician. Much of Robbins' commentary addresses the role of the media in election campaigns. Some have critiqued Robbins for his approach toward political satire, stating that his references to Reagan Era politics and the rebelliousness of the 1960s are simply too anachronistic in the context of the 1990s, but others have praised it for framing political commentary as a Hollywood comedy. In 2018, Robbins said: "Bob Roberts came true", referring to President Donald Trump. In July 2024, following an attempted assassination of Trump, a conspiracy theory emerged that it was staged akin to what happens in Bob Roberts. Robbins condemned the theory, writing on X: "Those that are denying the assassination attempt was real are truly in a deranged mindset."

The film grossed $4.5 million in the United States and Canada and $8 million worldwide.

== Awards ==
The film won the Georges Delerue Award for Best Soundtrack/Sound Design at Film Fest Gent in 1992.

Robbins was nominated for the Golden Globe Award for Best Leading Actor in a Motion Picture - Musical or Comedy (he lost to himself, also nominated for The Player).

== See also ==
- "Sideshow Bob Roberts", an episode of The Simpsons partially parodying Bob Roberts.
