= Rom baro =

Romani tribal leader

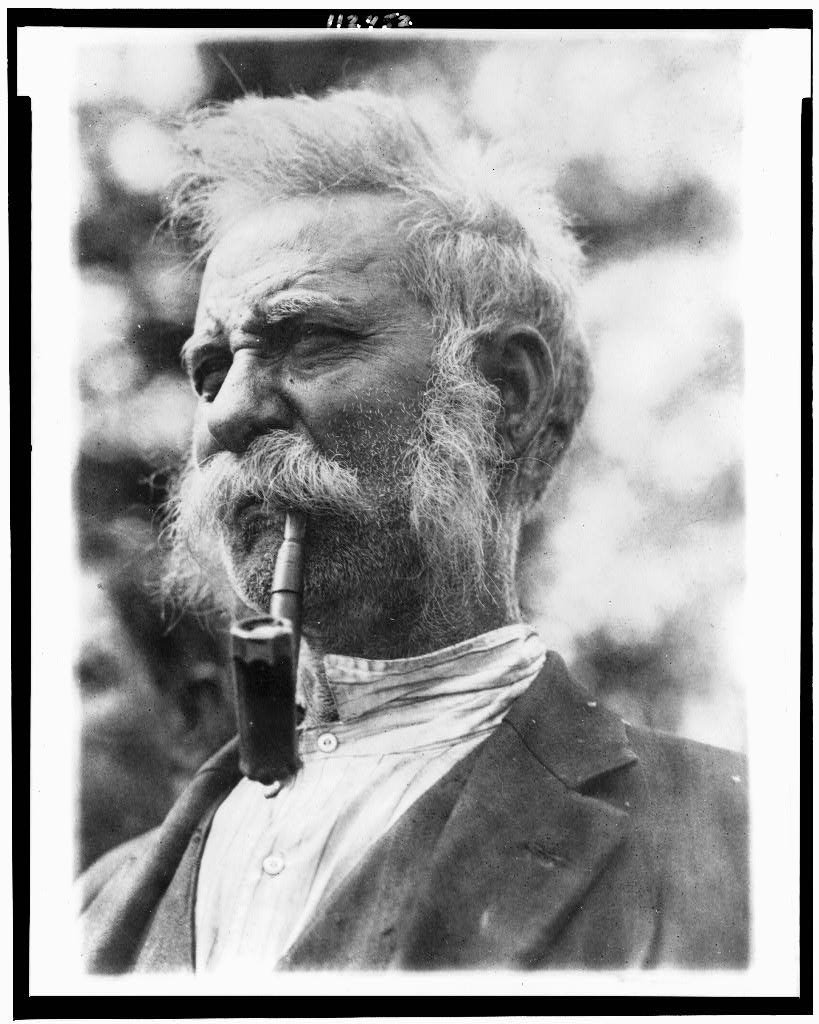
King John, an American Roma tribal leader (rom baro), at Mt. Olivet Cemetery, during the burial of his wife Queen Eleanora

In Roma communities in North America and some areas of Europe, the rom baro (lit. 'big man') is the tribal leader. He earns his position through merit, and his decisions ‒ although considered wise ‒ do not have the automatic approval of the community. Other factors in the selection of a rom baro include knowledge of the language of the areas of planned travel and resourcefulness in emergency situations.

== Etymology ==
The term baro is of Indic origin, and implies not only "big", but also powerful and important. Some Canadian and American Roma groups have substituted the term shato, a contraction of O Baro Shato, "the bigshot".

== Tribal leaders ==
The rom baro are chosen by their communities; the main criteria for choosing a rom baro is their intelligence and a sense of fairness. The leaders are usually older in age, as the older a Roma is, the better knowledge of Roma law and traditions they are viewed as having. They act as advisors for the king of their respective tribe or company and are usually fairly wealthy. A rom baro is elected for life and the position is not inheritable. The rom baro is the head of their patriarchal groups known as familias but, their authority extends far beyond their own familias, encompassing their respective tribes or companies (Romani: kumpania). The role of the rom baro is to handle all the internal problems in their tribe or company such as disagreements in work, marriage, family relations, trials, funerals, etc., while also, dealing with Gadjo (non-Roma) authorities in making sure their tribe is in good standing with the American law, arranging work, and handling outside pressures to assimilate. While the rom baro has a considerable amount of power and influence among their Roma tribe (Romani: vitsa), they are still subject to the Roma law and the Kris (Romani court). A rom baro who fails to provide for his community or breaks the Roma law will be removed from his position by Kris. This includes getting in trouble with gadje authorities and revealing Roma secrets which will make them not only lose their position, but also be outcasts from the tribe and considered impure.

== Notable rom baros ==
- Jimmy Marks; the rom baro of the Spokane Roma until he was deposed for getting in trouble with the law and revealing the secrets of the Roma.

== See also ==
- Gadjo (non-Romani)
- King of the Gypsies – Multi-contextual title with different meanings
- Romanipen (Romani spirit)
