= Ronald Lee =

Romani-Canadian writer and activist (1934–2020)

- Born: 1934; Montreal, Canada
- Died: January 25, 2020 (aged 85)
- Occupations: Writer, linguist, activist

Ronald Lee (1934 – January 25, 2020) was a Romani Canadian writer, linguist, professor, folk musician, and activist. He studied Romani society and culture and worked to foster intercultural dialogue between Roma and Non-Roma.

== Early life and education ==
Ronald Lee was born in Montreal, Canada in 1934. Lee's father was a Kalderash musician from Europe who immigrated to Canada, where he married and took his wife's surname of Lee.

In 1939, his family went to Great Britain on a visit but were unable to return to Canada for several years because of the outbreak of World War II. The Lees eventually returned to Canada in 1945.

After returning to Canada, Lee worked during the summer with his uncle for the fairs and amusement parks. In the fall, winter, and spring seasons, he attended night school in Montreal in the 1950s and 1960s. When Lee was 18, he started to travel with a Kalderash family from Europe and worked on plating mixing bowls and doing other smithing arts and odd jobs. Later, he took courses in journalism and creative writing.

== Adult years ==
Lee began to work with the Canadian Roma as an activist in 1965, through the Kris Romani (Romani internal judicial assembly). He tried to foster a better understanding between Roma and non-Roma, to combat prejudice and misinformation in newspapers, and to help the Roma represent themselves. In the 1970s, he got involved in helping the Romani refugees from the Communist Eastern Bloc and ex-Yugoslavia. He went with Yul Brynner, Ian Hancock and John Tene to the United Nations on July 5, 1978 to present a Romani petition asking for NGO status. This was granted a year later.

From 1989 to 1990, he helped those seeking asylum who had been persecuted as Roma in their former countries. In 1997, he initiated and was one of the founders of Roma Community and Advocacy Centre (based in Toronto) and the Western Canadian Romani Alliance, in Vancouver, in 1998.

Ronald Lee taught a course on the Romani Diaspora at the University of Toronto from 2003 to 2008.

In 2014, Ronald Lee was honoured by Queen's University, Kingston, Ontario, with an Honorary Doctorate of Laws.

== Writings ==
- Goddamn Gypsy (1971), a popular autobiographical fiction novel translated into Spanish, German, Italian, Serbian, Czech, Russian, and other languages. Published by Tundra Books of Montreal, and McClelland and Stewart, Toronto, Canada
- The Living Fire (E Zhivindi Yag) (2009), the republication of Goddamn Gypsy (above) under the author's originally intended title, by Magoria Books in 2009.
- Lee, Ronald (1997). "The Rom-Vlach Gypsies and the Kris-Romani". The American Journal of Comparative Law. 45 (2). Oxford University Press: 345–392. doi:10.2307/840854. ISSN 2326-9197. JSTOR 840854.
- Learn Romani: Das-duma Rromanes, University Of Hertfordshire Press, 2005
- Glajar, V.; Radulescu, D., eds. (2008). "Roma in Europe". "Gypsies" in European Literature and Culture. United States: Palgrave Macmillian. ISBN 978-0-230-61163-4.
- Romani Dictionary: Kalderash-English, Magoria Books, 2010. ISBN 978-0-9811626-4-5
