= St Hilda's Church, Darlington =

St Hilda’s Church, Darlington
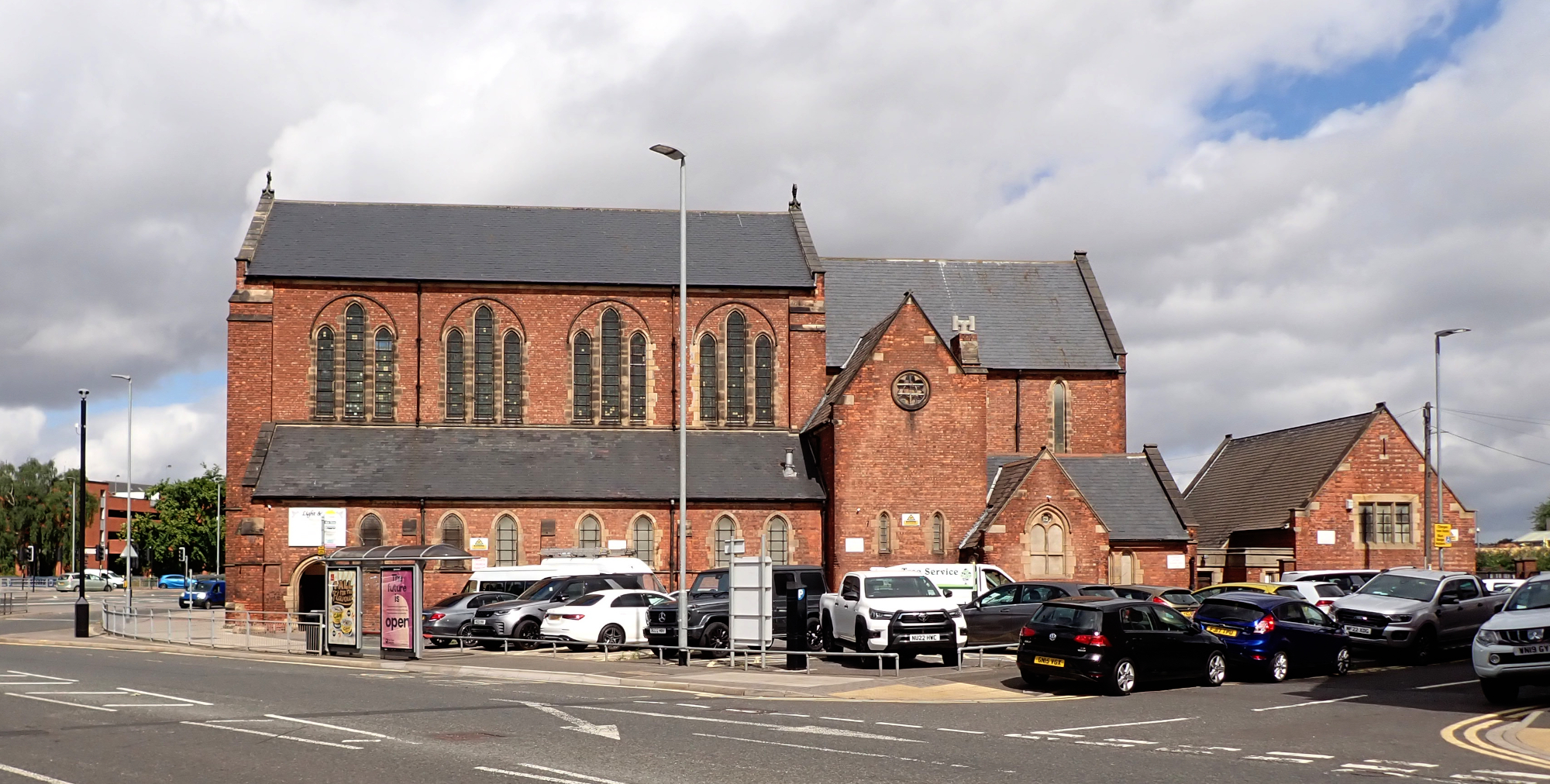

- Location within County Durham
- 54°31′29.1″N 1°32′59.5″W
- OS grid reference: NZ 29259 14495
- Location: Darlington
- Country: England
- Denomination: Independent
- Previous denomination: Church of England

History
- Consecrated: 30 August 1888

Architecture
- Heritage designation: Grade II listed
- Architect: John Loughborough Pearson
- Groundbreaking: 21 September 1887
- Construction cost: £6,000 (equivalent to £624,100 in 2025).

Specifications
- Capacity: 560 worshippers
- Length: 107 feet (33 m)
- Height: 56 feet (17 m)

St Hilda's Church, Darlington is a Grade II listed former Church of England church on Parkgate, Darlington, County Durham.

== History ==
A new parish was formed from St John's Church, Darlington containing a population of 11,000. The site was donated by Mary Eason of Ladbrooke Gardens, Notting Hill, London who also contributed £1,000 to the cost of construction and another £1,000 to its endowment.

The foundation stone was laid by the Bishop of Durham on 21 September 1887.

The church was designed by the architect John Loughborough Pearson. It consisted of a nave, north and south aisles, organ chamber, chapel, chancel and two vestries. The west window overlooked Parkgate. A tower was planned but not built. The roofs were of pitch pine open woodwork, and in the nave are six piers of stone with moulded bases and capitals, supporting arches of stone and brick. Four triple light lancet clerestory windows illuminated the church as the building was surrounded by other tall buildings. The altar was of oak, and the floor paved with wood blocks, and Staffordshire tiles.

The brick and stone works was done by Messrs McKenzie Bros, the joiner was R.T. Smith, the plumbing was done by H. Patch, the roof slating by Messrs J. & G. Wharton, and the painting by Messrs W.H. & W. Hoskins.

The pulpit was the gift of Mrs. R. Child and was designed by the architect and constructed of Leeds stone by Messrs Priestman & Sons, Bleckwellgate, Darlington. The font was the gift of Mrs. Harland. The brass lectern was the gift of Mr. W. Russell.

Pevsner noted that the building was a boldly massed composition of nave, chancel, N chapel, and S vestries, despite being extremely cheap.

The church was consecrated on 30 August 1888 by the Bishop of Durham Rt Revd. Joseph Lightfoot.

== Post Anglican use ==
The church was declared redundant by the Church of England in 1986. The church is now the Light and Life Mission Church.

== Organ ==
The 3-manual tubular-pneumatic action organ was built by T.C. Lewis of Brixton in 1892. The organ cases were designed by John Loughborough Pearson and executed by Mr. T.M. Hobson of Darlington. The organ cost £192 (equivalent to £21,100 in 2025).

A specification of the organ can be found on the National Pipe Organ Register.
