= International Romani Day =

International observance; 8 April

- Flag of the Romani people
- Observed by: Worldwide (Observance in North Macedonia); (Observance as "Day of Romas" in Kosovo)
- Type: International
- Significance: Civil awareness day Romani culture
- Date: 8 April
- Next time: 8 April 2027
- Frequency: annual
- Related to: Holocaust Memorial Days, International Mother Language Day, Human Rights Day

The International Romani Day (8 April) is a day to celebrate Romani culture and raise awareness of the issues facing Romani people.

== Origin ==
The day was officially declared in 1990 in Serock, Poland, the site of the fourth World Romani Congress of the International Romani Union (IRU), in honour of the first major international meeting of Romani representatives, 7–12 April 1971 in Chelsfield near London.

== International reaction ==
- Pope John Paul II exhorted his followers to treat Roma with compassion and respect.
- In 2004, Adam Ereli of the US State Department addressed the continuing human rights abuses faced by Roma and asked European governments to encourage tolerance.
- In 2006, Maud de Boer-Buquicchio, Council of Europe Deputy Secretary General, stated her concerns for growing Antiziganism and encouraged Europe's Romani populations to act to improve their poor living conditions, the result of longstanding and widespread discrimination.
- In 2009, U.S. Secretary of State Hillary Clinton spoke of the U.S. commitment to protecting and promoting the human rights of Romani people throughout Europe.

== See also ==
- World Day of Romani Language
