= World Day of Romani Language =

Commemoration on 5 November

- Observed by: Worldwide
- Type: International
- Significance: Civil awareness day that promotes Romani language and culture
- Date: 5 November
- Next time: 5 November 2027
- Frequency: Annual
- Related to: International Romani Day, Roma Holocaust Memorial Day, Human Rights Day

World Day of Romani Language promotes Romani language, culture and education. It is celebrated annually on 5 November, since 2009. Croatian Parliament officially recognized it in 2012 and UNESCO proclaimed 5 November the World Day of Romani Language in 2015. As of 2018, 16 Council of Europe member states recognize Romani language as a minority language under the European Charter for Regional or Minority Languages.

== History ==
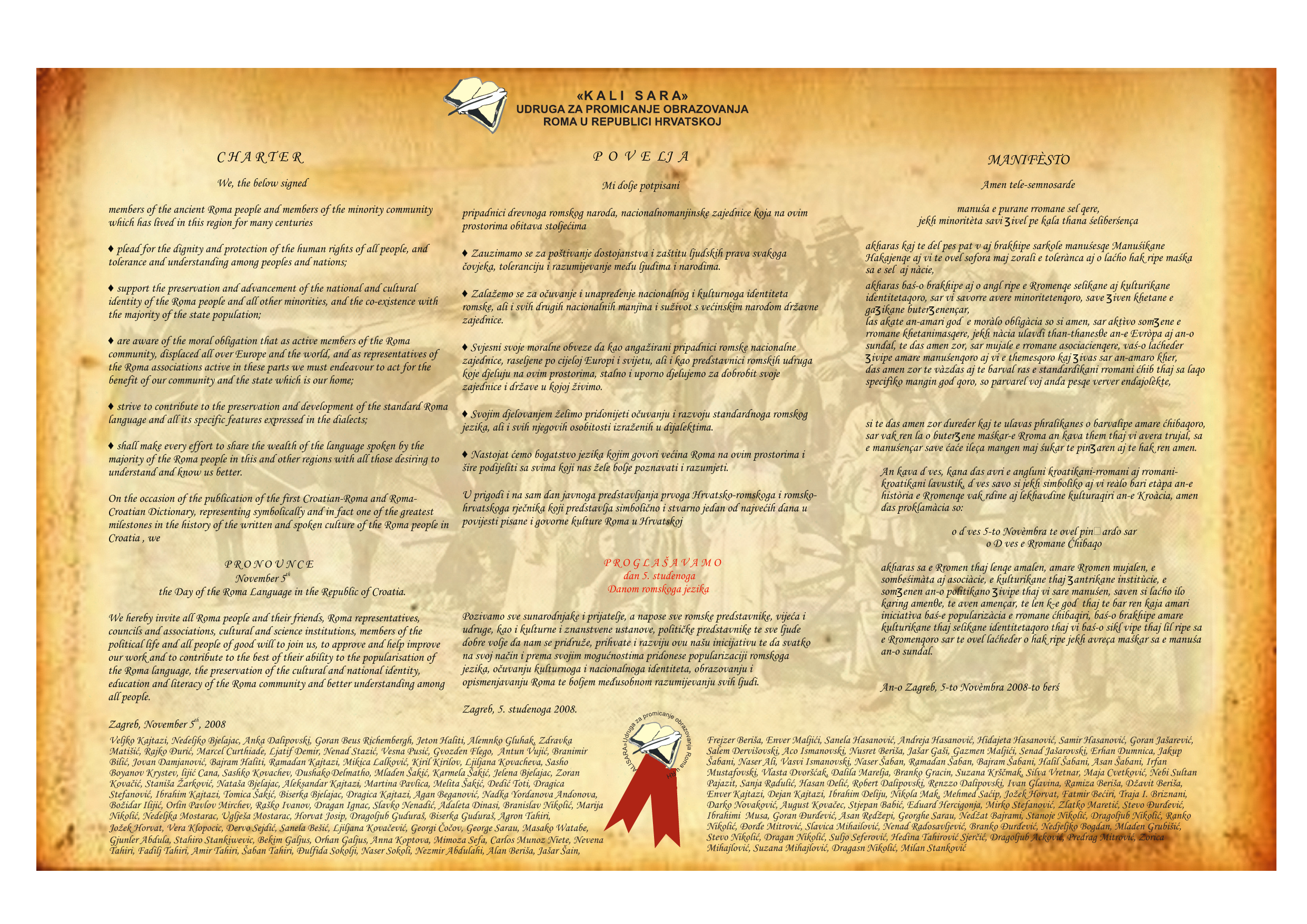
Charter pronouncing 5 November the Day of the Roma Language in the Republic of Croatia (5 November 2008, Zagreb, Croatia)

On 5 November 2008 in Zagreb, Croatia, during the presentation of first Roma-Croatian and Croatian-Roma Dictionary written by Romani scholar and politician Veljko Kajtazi, representatives of Romani community from all around the world and members of Croatian public life signed the charter which pronounced 5 November the Day of the Roma Language in the Republic of Croatia. Signing of the charter was initiated and organized by Veljko Kajtazi and Croatian Association for Education of Roma People "Kali Sara" (today called Croatian Romani Union "KALI SARA"), and the charter was signed by approximately 150 individuals.

In 2009 during the World Symposium for Standardization and Codification of Romani Language which took place from 3 to 5 November 2009 in Zagreb, Croatia, International Romani Union and Croatian Association for Education of Roma People "Kali Sara" issued a declaration asking for recognition of 5 November as the World Day of the Romani Language in all countries where Roma people live. This occasion also marked the first official celebration of this date.

Croatian Parliament unanimously (122 votes for) accepted the request of its members to support the international initiative for marking the 5 November World Day of Romani Language at the session held on 25 May 2012, becoming the first parliament in the world to do so. At the request of Croatia, UNESCO proclaimed 5 November the World Day of Romani Language in 2015.

== See also ==
- International Romani Day
