= Marime =

Romani concept of ritual impurity

Marime, mahrime, or marimé is a central concept in traditional Romani culture, particularly within Vlax and Northern Roma groups, that refers to a notion of ritual impurity. The opposite of marime is užo, a term referring to ritual cleanliness. The interpretation of the laws of marime vary in different Romani communities and individual Romani people vary in how strictly they follow the laws. Some Romani people do not follow the laws of marime at all.

== Terminology ==
The term marime is derived from the Greek language. In England and Wales, the concept is referred to as mochadi or moxado and in Poland as magerdó. Moxado and magerdó both mean "besmirched" and are derived from "mraks", a Sanskrit term meaning "smeared". Sinti people refer to the concept with the terms "palećido" (neglected or isolated) and "prast(l)o" (inflamed or outlawed).

== About ==
While each adult is capable of causing ritual pollution, adult women of child-bearing age have traditionally been assumed to possess a particular power to cause ritual pollution. The notions of marime and žužo refer to particular regions of the body and physical proximity to those regions. The body above the waist is considered ritually pure, while the body below the waist is considered ritually impure and capable of polluting the pure. The head is considered the most ritually pure part of the body because it is furthest from the lower half of the body. Only the hands are capable of freely moving between the pure and the impure. Requirements for ritual purity pertain to almost all aspects of Romani life and culture, including domestic arrangements, preparation of food, washing of clothing, and all public interactions between men and women. Because restrooms must be segregated according to sex to avoid ritual pollution, Romani people have traditionally preferred homes with at least two separate restrooms. A man may become marime if he is in a room below a woman on the second floor. Publicly discussing matters related to the lower body may cause ritual pollution or be considered offensive. All people who do not follow the laws of Romani ritual purity are considered marime, which by definition includes all non-Romani people. Some Romani people believe that interactions with non-Romani people, commonly referred to as gadjos, might cause ritual pollution and therefore limit unnecessary contact with non-Romani. Romani people who avoid non-Romani people tend to limit their interactions to business transactions. Some Romani people may install new sinks and toilets when they move into a residence that was once inhabited by non-Romani people.

=== Clothing ===
The laws of marime regulate the washing and drying of clothes. Clothes for the upper body such as shirts must never be washed or dried together with clothes worn on the lower body such as pants, skirts, underwear, and socks. Women's clothes and men's clothes are washed and dried separately. Clothes that become contaminated must be destroyed. A man must not walk underneath a clothesline where women's clothes are hanging to dry. For those families who can afford it, four washing machines may be owned; one each for male, female, upper body, and lower body clothes.

=== Death ===
Dead bodies are considered marime.

=== Food ===
The laws of marime regulate what food Romani people are permitted to eat and how food should be prepared. Cats and dogs are marime and must not be eaten, because these animals lick their lower bodies with their tongues. Frog meat and snake meat are considered unlucky and are associated with the Devil. Peacock meat is forbidden because peacocks are associated with the evil eye. Romani people who strictly observe the laws of marime tend to not eat at restaurants and will avoid food prepared by non-Romani people. Romani people who do eat at non-Romani restaurants sometimes bring their own utensils, eat with their hands, or ask for paper or plastic cups and plates.

Romani women are expected to wear aprons when preparing food, to avoid the food becoming contaminated by the woman's skirt. Menstruating women are prohibited from preparing food altogether. Food that comes in contact with menstruating women also becomes marime, so the food must be destroyed. Romani women are expected to eat alone while menstruating. Even women who are not menstruating may cause food to become marime if the food comes in contact with a woman's lower body. If a Romani woman steps over food that she is gathering, such as berries, the food becomes marime and must be discarded. Sponges and clothes used to clean the body must never be used to clean dishes or cutlery. Hands must be washed in a separate sink from the kitchen sink to avoid contaminating the dishes, utensils, and food.

=== Living arrangements ===
Women and men use separate restrooms in Romani households. Women may not sleep or walk in rooms on a higher level of a house because she might walk above a man who is located in a room below, thus making him marime. In Eastern Europe, many Romani have come to disregard this custom due to living in apartment blocks.

For those Romani people who permit non-Romani people inside of their homes, special precautions may be taken. Certain areas may be designated for non-Romani people. Chairs may be covered in plastic, because it would be contaminated if a non-Romani person sat on it. A Romani home may have separate glasses and dishes for Romani guests. When Romani people move into a house previously owned by a non-Romani person, extensive cleaning is required. The house will be cleaned with bleach and re-painted and all carpets and curtains will be replaced. Public restrooms are generally avoided, except to wash hands, and if so paper towels will be used to turn faucets on and off.

=== Sexuality ===
The laws of marime regulate sexuality and reproduction. Oral sex and anal sex are prohibited because the lower and upper halves of the body come in contact. Sex involving a menstruating woman is also prohibited. All lower body emissions including menstrual blood, semen, urine, and feces are considered marime. Nudity is problematic, particularly female nudity. Romani women are expected to dress and undress while facing away from men, and married Romani women arise in the morning before their husbands to avoid exposing them to their frontal nudity. A Romani person who has had sex with or partnered with a non-Romani person may be considered permanently marime and thus ineligible for marriage to another Romani person.

After giving birth, a Romani mother is considered marime for a period of 40 days. During this 40 day period, Romani Christian mothers are prohibited from attending church services. Menstruating women are also prohibited from entering a church.

=== Social exclusion ===
A person who brings shame or scandal to the Romani community may be considered marime and therefore banished as an outcast (Romani: shudine/chhudine). The decision to declare a person marime is decided by a kris, a traditional Romani court used for conflict resolution. A person's designation as marime may be temporary or permanent. A kris may declare a person marime for committing murder, theft, or some other crime. The kris is found among the Vlax Romani, but is not found among the Romanichal or the Finnish Kale.

Due to bringing too much exposure to the Romani community of Spokane, Washington, the Romani leader Jimmy Marks was deemed marime by the community.

== Comparison to other cultural practices ==
Cornell University professor Calum Carmichael has discussed the similarities and differences between Jewish religious law (halakha) and marime. He notes ritualistic similarities regarding avoidance of blood from animals or menstruating women and detailed standards regarding ritual hygiene and food consumption, but notes that Jewish law and Romani law do not share common origins. Marquette University professor Alison Barnes has stated that comparing and contrasting Jewish law and Romani law can provide "insight regarding the effects of ritual behavior on the observant", despite the major differences between the two approaches.

== See also ==
- Kashrut
- Ritual purification
- Ritual purity in Islam
- Romani society and culture
- Tumah and taharah
