= Romani culture =

Culture of the Romani people

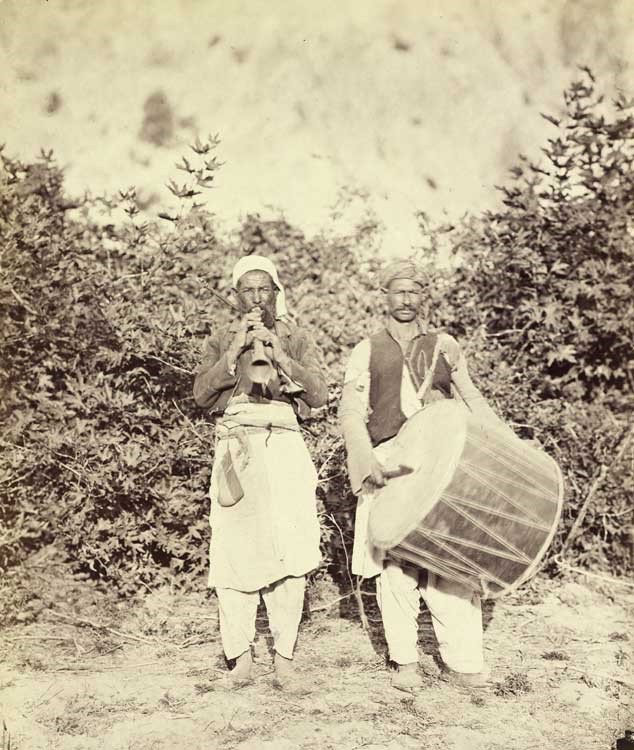
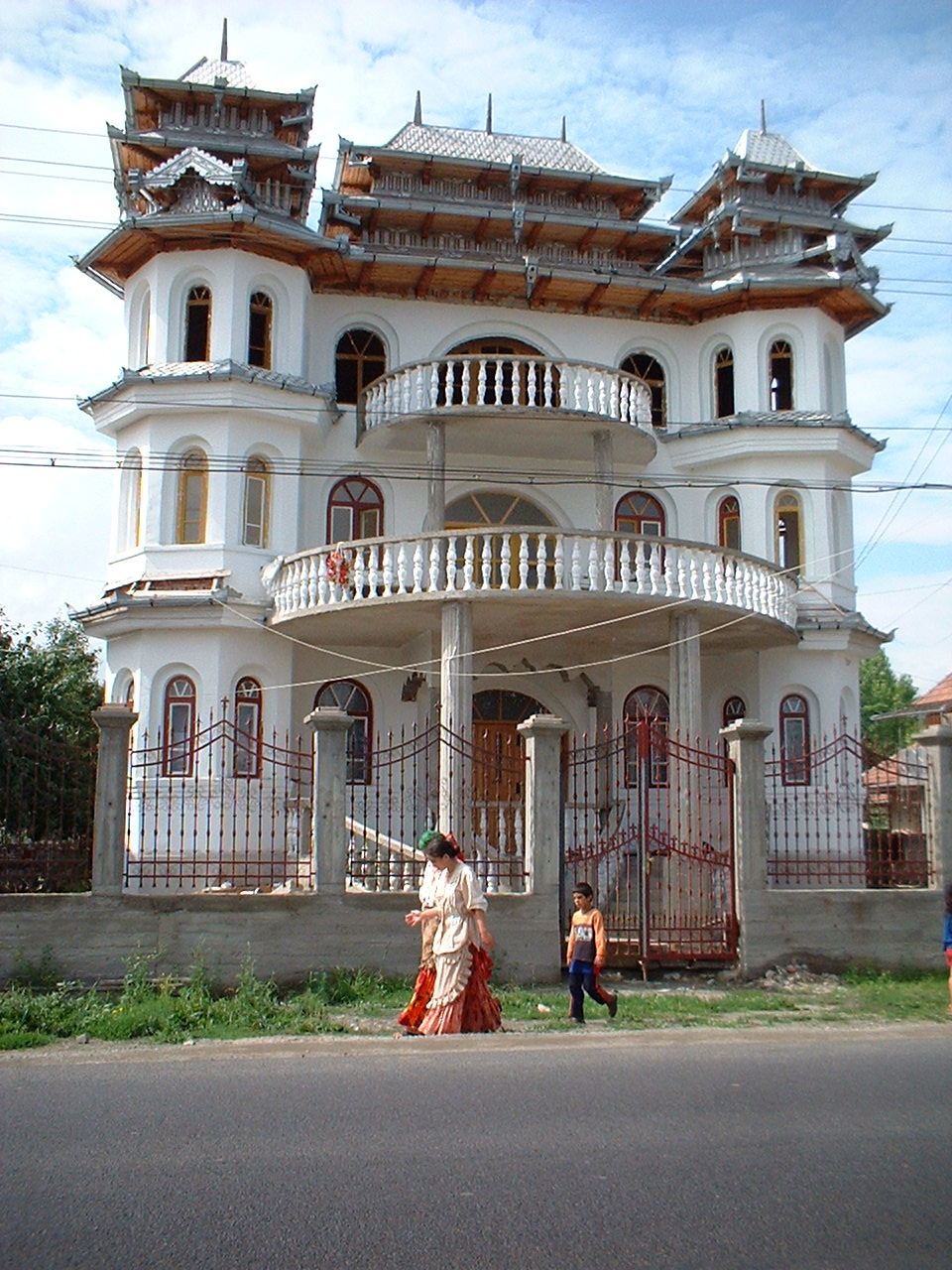
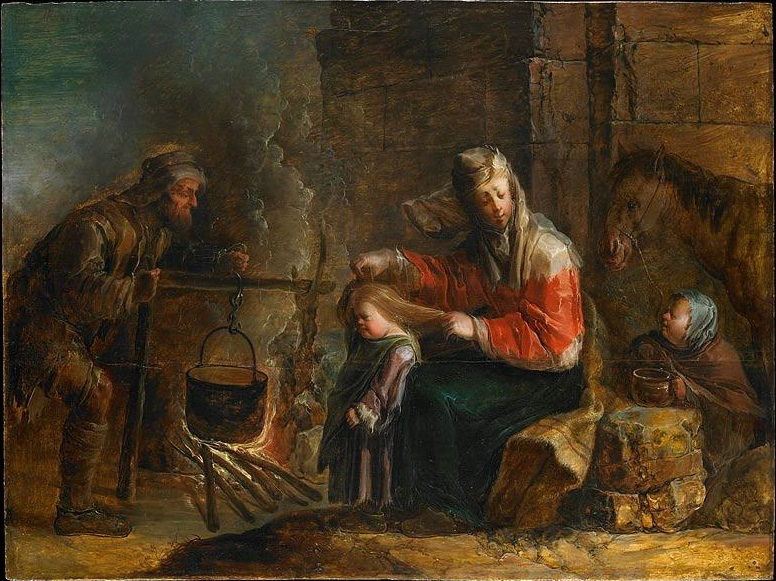
Clockwise: Romani musicians in North Macedonia (1863), 20th century Romani kastello in Romania, 17th century Romani family in the Spanish Netherlands preparing food in a cauldron

Romani culture encompasses the regional cultures of the Romani people. These cultures have developed through complex histories of interaction with their surrounding populations, and have been influenced by their time spent under various reigns and empires, notably the Byzantine and Ottoman empires.

Romani people constitute the largest ethnic minority in Europe. They are believed to have resided in the Balkans since the 9th century, with their subsequent migration to other parts of the continent beginning in the 15th century. The Romani people in Europe may belong to various subgroups such as the Boyash, Kalderash, Kalé, Kaale, Lăutari, Lovari, Manouche, Romanichal, Romanisael, Romungro, Ruska, Sinti and Vlax. Despite a history of persecution in the continent, they have maintained their distinct culture. There is also a significant Romani population in the Americas, stemming from later migrations from Europe.

Romani people place emphasis on the importance of family and traditionally uphold strict moral values. Traditionally, it was custom among some Romani to maintain a nomadic lifestyle.

== Origins ==
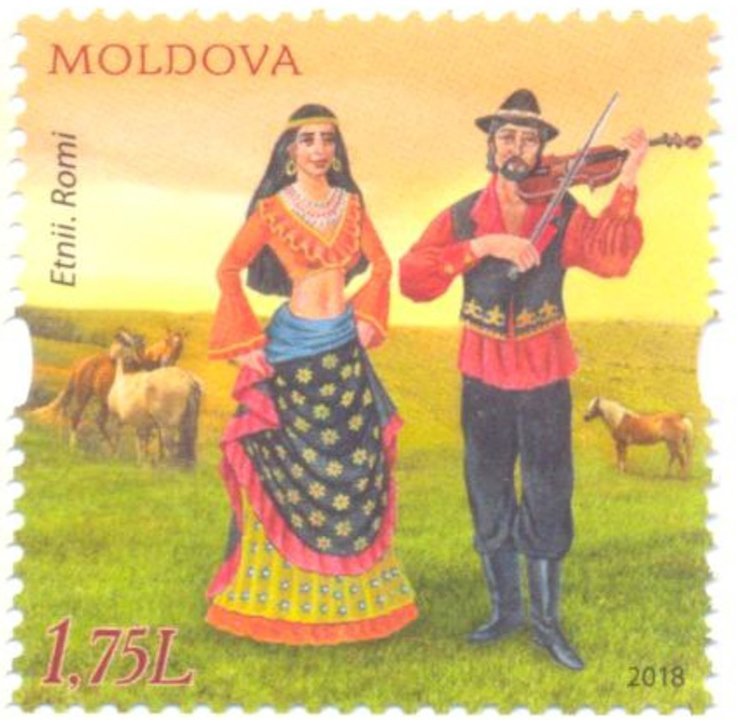
Roma depicted in a 2018 Moldovan postage stamp

Linguistic and phonological research has established that the ancestors of the Romani people originated in South Asia, likely in the regions of present-day Punjab, Rajasthan and Sindh. The Romani language shares features with Sanskrit, Hindi, Punjabi, Rajasthani and Urdu and Kashmiri. The language also has significant Armenian, Byzantine Greek and Persian influence.

There are legends surrounding the origins of the Romani people. For example, some Roma believe that they are the descendants of musicians from India who were led by the Persian king Bahram V from India to Iran at A.D. 420–438, before wandering over the Silk Road to Europe.

Although the Romanies’ ancestors originated in South Asia, cultural elements retained from this early heritage are limited, with the exception of the language.

== Names ==
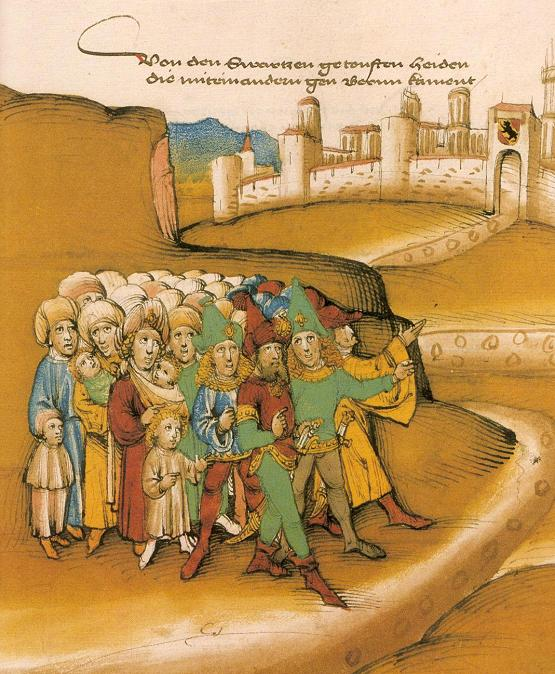
Arrival of Romanies ("Gypsies") in Berne, Switzerland in the 15th century, dressed in Saracen-style attire

The Romani people are today found across the world. Typically, Romanies adopt given names that are common in the country of their residence. Seldom do modern Romanies use the traditional name from their own language, such as Čingaren. Romani is the only Indo-Aryan language to have been spoken exclusively in Europe. Speakers use many terms for their language. They generally refer to their language as Čingari čhib or řomani čhib translated as 'the Romani language', or rromanes, 'in a Rom way'. The English term, Romani, has been used by scholars since the 19th century, where previously they had used the term 'Gypsy language'.

The name Romani is believed to have derived from the Indic word doma. The shift from Doma to Roma/Romani is believed to have taken place during the Romanies’ arrival and settlement in the Balkans during the Byzantine period. Roma/Romani is believed to have been influenced by the Medieval Greek word Romaios. The Byzantine Empire was referred to by its inhabitants as Romanía. This is where the Romanies are thought to have "crystallised into a cohesive people".

== Family and life stages ==
Traditionally, Roma place a high value on the extended family.

=== Marriage and controversies ===
Marriage in Romani society underscores the importance of family and demonstrates ties between different groups, often transnationally. Traditionally, an arranged marriage is highly desirable. It is custom for the parents of the groom to pay the family of the bride. Parents of the potential bridal couple help identify an ideal partner for their child. Parents may pressure a particular spouse on their child, because it is an established norm to be married by your mid-twenties. School, church, Mosques, circumcision ceremonies, engagement parties and weddings are common venues for finding a prospective spouse. Potential couples are expected to be supervised or chaperoned by an adult. With the emergence of social media and mobile phones, and the advancing education of women, many traditional mores and conservative views have softened. In some Romani groups, for example the Finnish Roma, the practice of legally registered marriages is disregarded altogether.

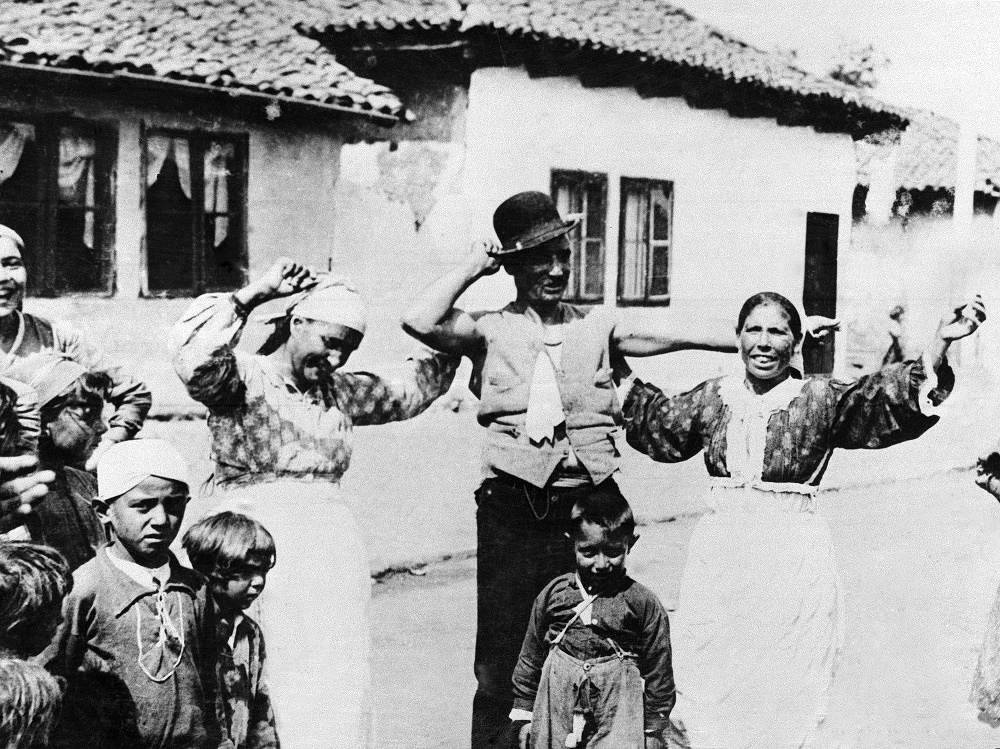
Romani wedding in Sofia (1936)

The Romani practice of child marriage in certain countries of southeastern Europe has attracted substantial controversy across the world. In 2003, one of the many self-styled Romani "kings", Ilie Tortică, prohibited marriage before the parties were of legal age in their country of residence. A Romani patriarch, Florin Cioabă, ran afoul of Romanian authorities in late 2003 when he married off his youngest daughter, Ana-Maria, at the age of twelve, well below the legal marriageable age.

Bride kidnapping (not to be confused with the Romanian festive tradition of bride kidnapping) is believed to be a traditional part of Romani practice. Girls as young as twelve years old may be kidnapped for marriage to teenage boys. This practice has been reported in Ireland, England, the Czech Republic, the Netherlands, Bulgaria, and Slovakia. Bride kidnapping is thought to be a way to avoid a bride price, or else a means for a girl to marry a boy deemed unsuitable by her family. The tradition's normalisation of kidnapping puts young women at higher risk of becoming victims of human trafficking.

The practices of bride kidnapping and child marriage are not universally accepted throughout Romani culture. Some Romani women and men seek to eliminate such customs.

Islamic marital practices have been adopted by Muslim Roma.

Romani mothers breastfeed their children for optimal health and increased immunity. They also view this as a gift from God, and a help to building healthy relationships between mothers and children.

Homosexuality, sodomy and oral sex are traditionally prohibited, but some Roma are trying to end the stigma.

=== Feud ===
The blood revenge, blood feud, or vendetta is an old form of private justice intended to restore Romani family honor by killing a perceived offender. Such retaliation is carried out only in response to serious damage to honor, such as the killing itself, which no other damage compensation within the feud can do justice to.

=== Purity and death ===
Clothes for the lower body, as well as the clothes of menstruating women, are washed separately. Items used for eating are washed in a different place.

Childbirth is considered "impure" and must occur outside the dwelling place; the mother is considered "impure" for 40 days.

The Muslim Roma (Horahane) in the Balkans adopted the Islamic culture during the Ottoman Empire period, and so did the Ritual purity in Islam.

For bathing, the Romani enter a spacious tub filled with water situated on the ground within the tent, where they stand and cleanse only the lower half of their bodies. The face and upper body are washed using water from a pan supported by a tripod, which is poured over the face and upper body with cupped hands, allowing the water to flow down into the tub. Romani men may wash their faces and upper bodies outside, sometimes shirtless. Each Romani family member bathes in order of age. One bar of soap is designated for the upper body, while another is used for the lower body.

Clothes worn by Romani women and Romani men, as well as those that cover the upper and lower body, are laundered and hung to dry separately. In certain Romani communities, the clothing of Romani elderly individuals is also washed and dried separately, both as a sign of respect and as a way to prevent potential defilement from contact with the garments of sexually active relatives.

=== Child-Raising ===
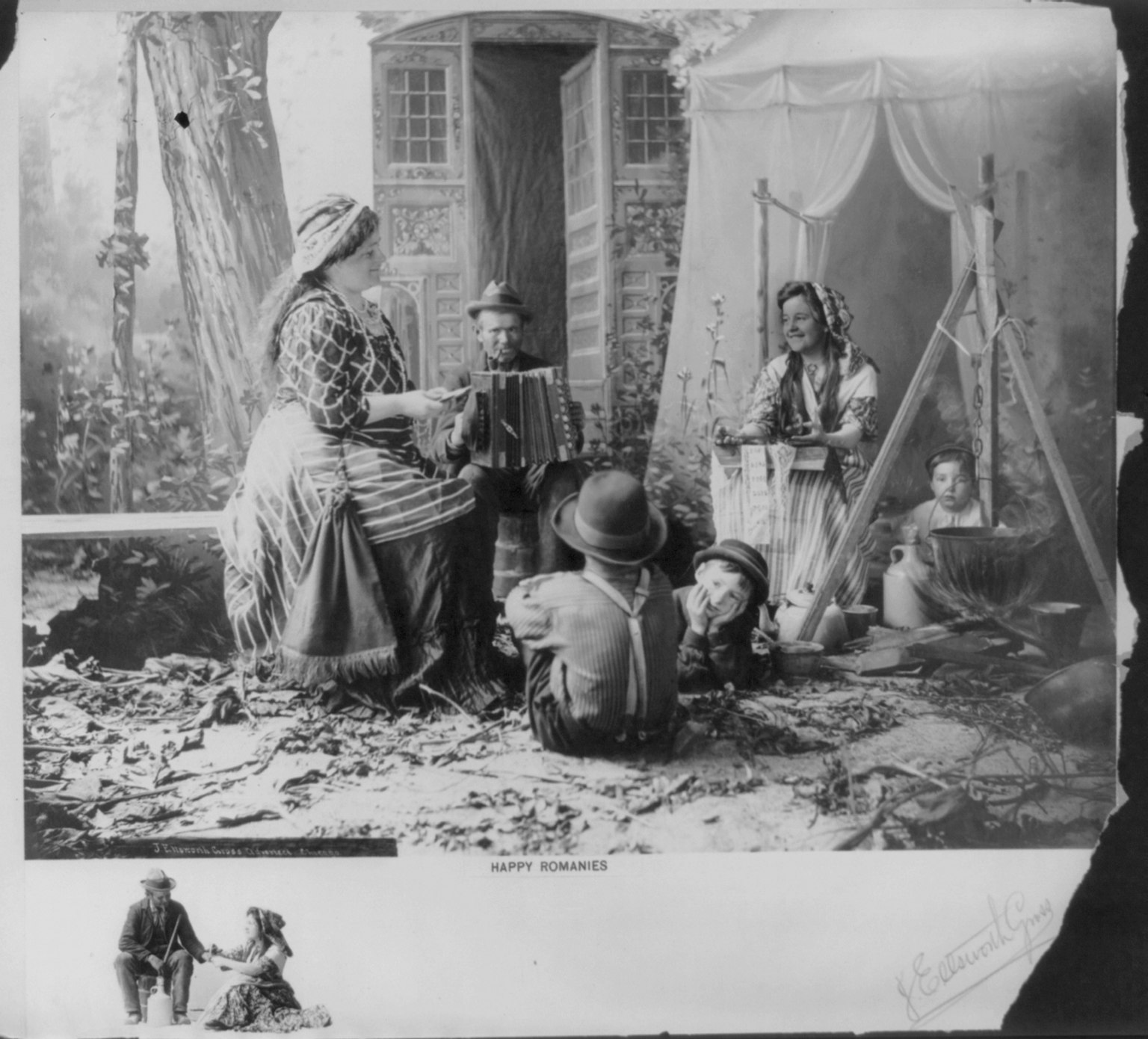
Romani family in the United States (1902)

Christian Romani people incorporate their values into how they raise their children. There is an element of impurity placed upon both the mother and father after the mother gives birth. This impurity is lessened if the child is a male and the family is considered "lucky". Traditionally, the couple will live with the father of the groom until their first child is born. Romani people place high value on extended family so godparents, along with this other family, are active in the child's life to ensure its well-being.

=== Godparenthood ===
Among Christian Romani people, godparenthood (known as kirvipen or kirvimos) is a widespread practice which functions as a form of kinship rather than carrying religious significance. Godparents were traditionally sought from within the Romani community but outside the extended family. Initially, the godparents' role is to assist in the baptism ceremony, where they bring presents such as clothes, jewelry, and money for the child, who often receives their name from their godparent. After the baptism, the godparents serve to support the godchild's family when in need, and to raise the child in the parent's absence. They are expected to participate and give presents in the most significant events of the godchild's life, including the first day of school and their wedding. Godparenthood is considered an honour and brings respect to the godparent in the community, with the level of respect being proportional to the number of godchildren the godparent has.

== Moral values ==
=== Romanipen ===
Romanipen (also romanypen, romanipe, romanype, romanimos, romaimos, romaniya) is a concept of Romani philosophy encompassing totality of the Romani spirit, culture, law, being a Rom, and a set of Romani strains.

An ethnic Rom is considered to be a Gadjikane Roma in Romani society if the person has no Romanipen. Sometimes a Gadjo, usually an adopted child, may be considered to be a Rom if the person has Romanipen. As a concept, Romanipen has been the subject of interest to numerous academic observers. It has been hypothesized that it owes more to a framework of culture than simply an adherence to historically received rules.

Significant changes in Romani culture following the Second World War have been attributed to the suspension of these social norms, as strict rules relating to food and contact with certain classes of people broke down. This period also coincided with a perceived loss of authority invested in traditional leaders, the primary maintainers of Romanipen. Furthermore, the Roma who found themselves under Soviet control during the war, while deported to the east of the Urals and often persecuted, were generally left alone to follow their orthodox practices and thus preserved strict interpretations of Romanipen. However, the Roma who lived in other countries of eastern Europe, in the face of widespread discrimination and society's attempts at forced assimilation, often had to compromise their strict interpretation of the customs to survive. As a result, the whole concept of Romanipen became interpreted differently among various Roma groups.

=== Being a part of Romani society ===
A considerable punishment for a Christian Rom is banishment from Romani society.

Ashkali and Balkan Egyptians like the Turkish Roma and Crimean Roma are not part of the Romani society due to the lack of Romanipen.

=== Romani Code ===
Romani Code, or Romano Zakono, is the most important part of Romanipen. It is a set of rules for Romani life, different than Romani religions.

Though Romani ethnic groups have different sets of rules, Oral Romani cultures are most likely to adhere to the Romani code, although these communities are geographically spread.

The Romani Code is not written; Romani people keep it alive in oral tradition.

The kris is a traditional institution for upholding and enforcing the Romani Code.

The code can be summarised in pillars; the main pillar representing the polar ideas of baxt (pronounced [baxt], bah-kht) meaning 'honour' and ladž (or laʒ, pronounced [ladʒ], lah-j) meaning 'shame'.

in some Romani cultures, It is considered honorable to celebrate baxt by being generous and displaying success to the public. The focus on generosity means sharing food is of great importance to some groups of Roma. Making lavish meals to share with other Romani visitors is commonplace and in some cases not having food to share is considered shameful.

=== Faith and religion ===
The majority of Romani people are Christian or Muslim. During Ottoman times, Orthodox Christian Romani in the Balkans were known as Dasikane; the meaning is sometimes given as a slave or servant. Muslim or Turkified Romani people were known as Xoraxane. There are differences between the culture and traditions of Dasikane and Xoroxane. There are also differences in traditions amongst the Dasikane and the Xoroxane themselves, depending on factors such as the country in which they live, a subgroup to which they belong, or their family tradition.

==== Deities and saints ====
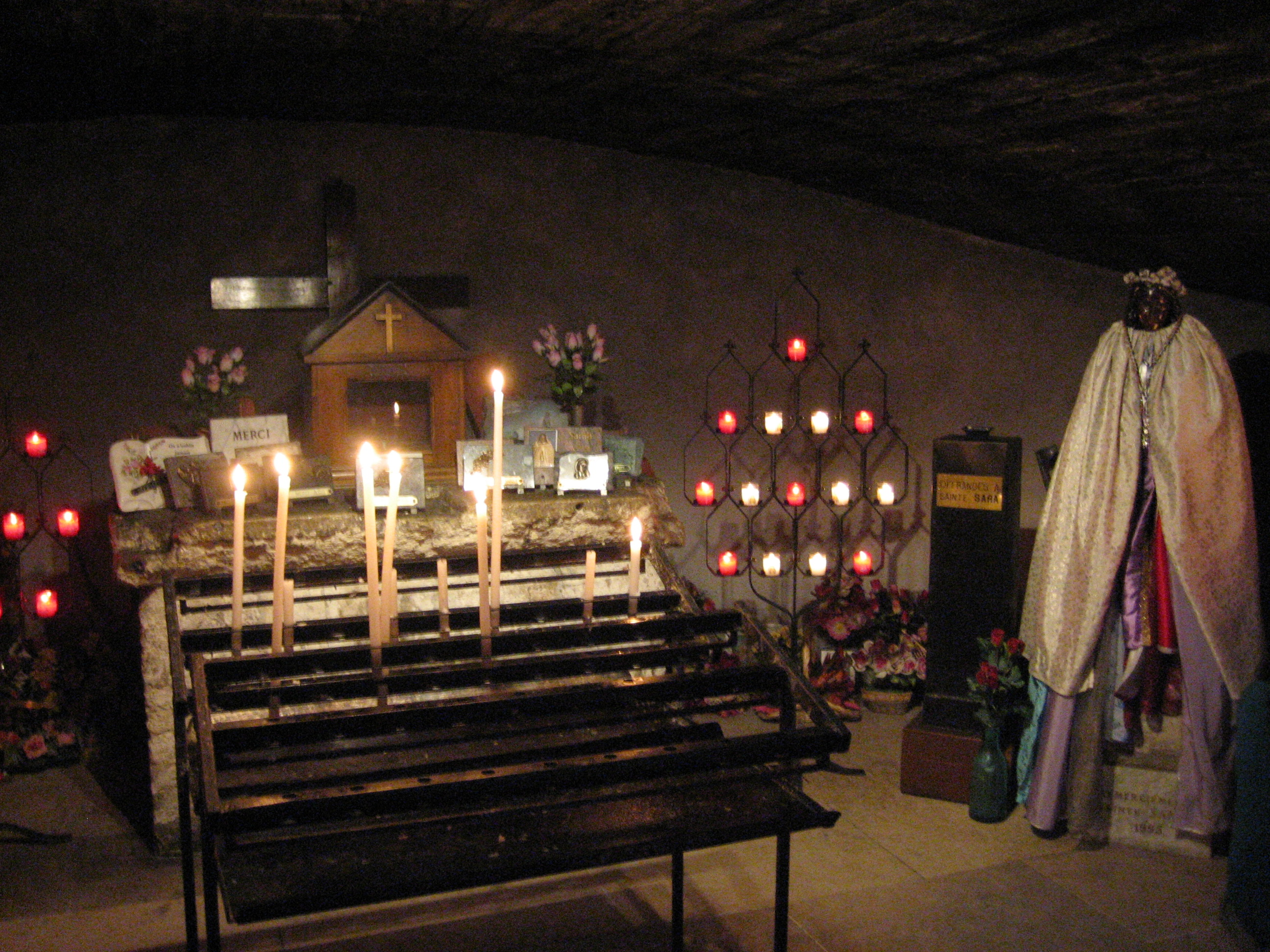
The cult of Saint Sara in the shrine of Saintes-Maries-de-la-Mer, Southern France, is a devotion associated with Catholic Romanies.

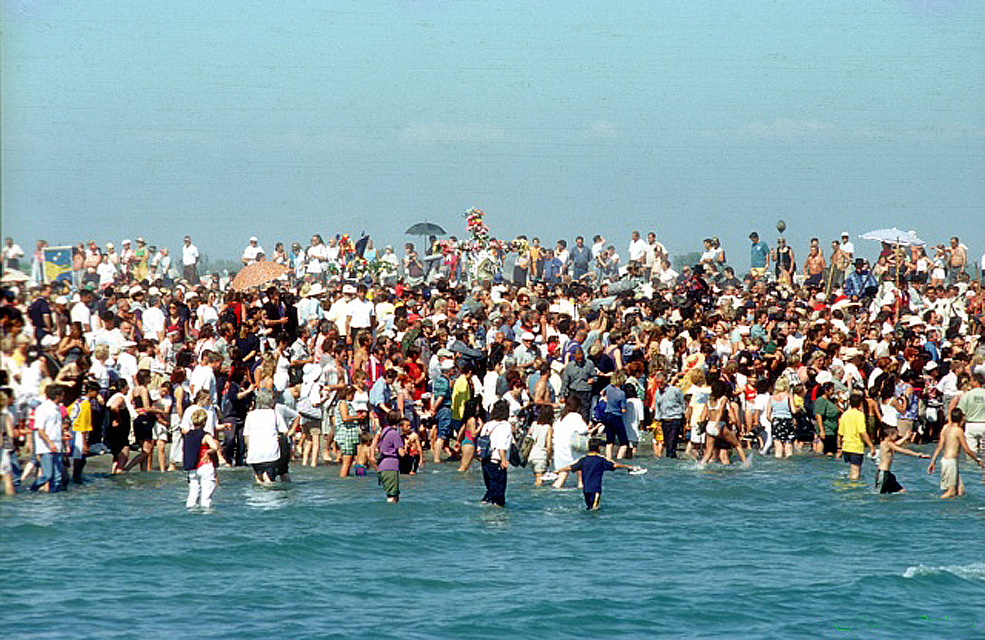
Ritual bath during the Romani pilgrimage of Saintes-Maries-de-la-Mer

Blessed Ceferino Giménez Malla is considered a patron saint of the Romani people in Roman Catholicism. Virgin of Hope of Macarena is considered a patron saint of the Spanish Calé.

Saint Sarah, or Kali Sara, has been revered as a patron saint in the same manner as the Blessed Ceferino Giménez Malla, but a transition occurred in the 21st century, whereby Kali Sara is understood as an Indian deity brought by the refugee ancestors of the Romani people, thereby removing any Christian association. Saint Sarah is progressively being considered as "a Romani goddess, the Protectress of the Roma" and an "indisputable link with Mother India". The Roma pilgrimage for the dark-skinned Saint Sara in Saintes-Maries-de-la-Mer is said to have possibly been the Egyptian servant of the three Marys. The day of the pilgrimage honouring Sarah is 24 May; her statue is carried down to the sea on this day to re-enact her arrival in France.

==== Christian Roma ceremonies and practices ====
Romani often adopt the dominant religion of their host country if a ceremony associated with a formal religious institution is necessary, such as a baptism or funeral (their particular belief systems and indigenous religion and worship remain preserved regardless of such adoption processes). A very small minority of Romani practice "Shaktism", a practice with origins in India, whereby a female consort is required for the worship of a god. Adherence to this practice means that for the Romani who worship a Christian God, prayer is conducted through the Virgin Mary, or her mother, Saint Anne.

Romani elders serve as spiritual leaders; there are no specific Christian Romani priests, churches, or Christian Romani scriptures, the exception being the Pentecostal Romani, most in Western society.

Within the United Kingdom, a large proportion of Romani (40% by some estimates) are members of Light and Life, a Charismatic Pentecostal Christian movement.

==== Muslim Romani communities in the Balkans ====
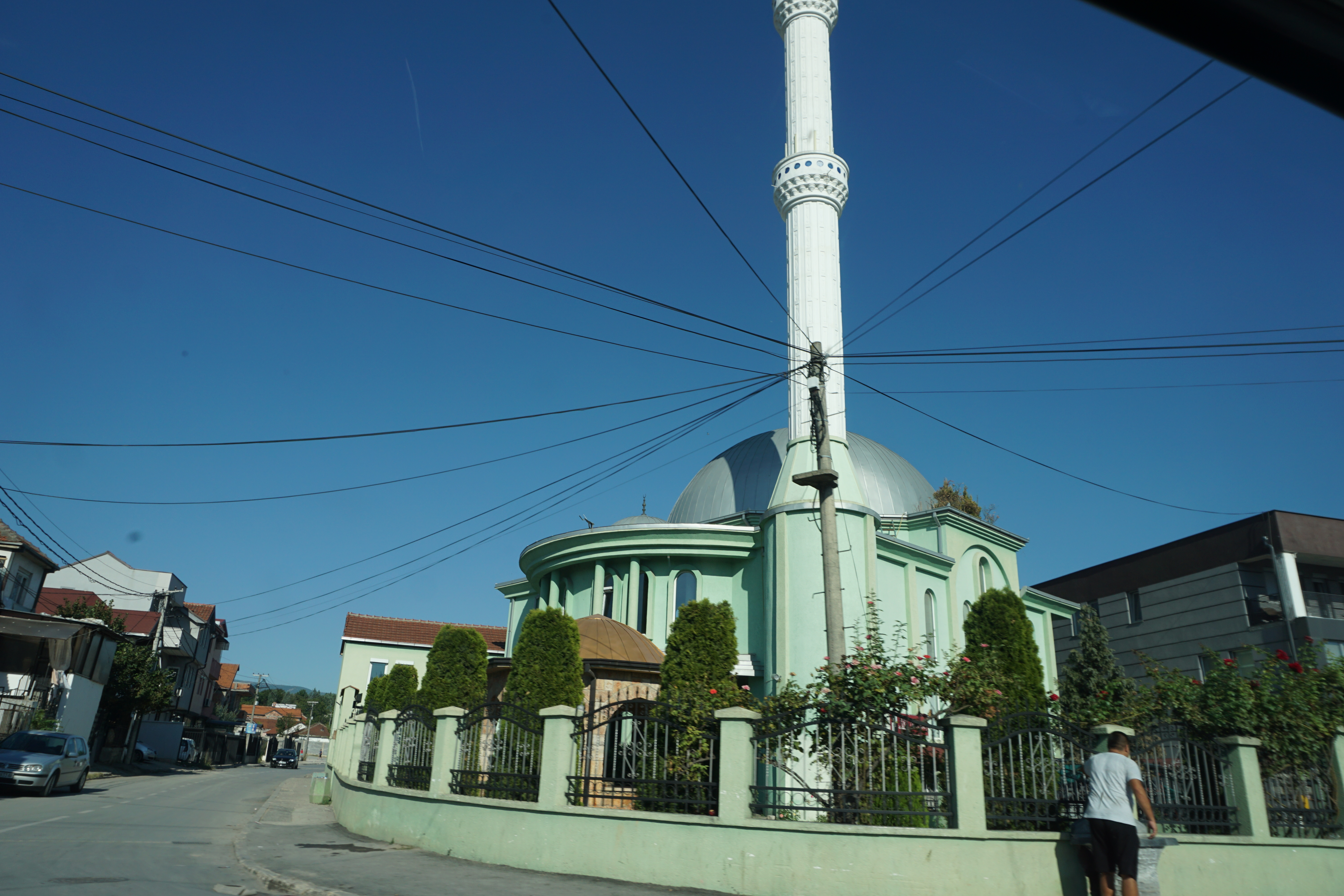
Romani mosque in Šuto Orizari, Skopje, North Macedonia

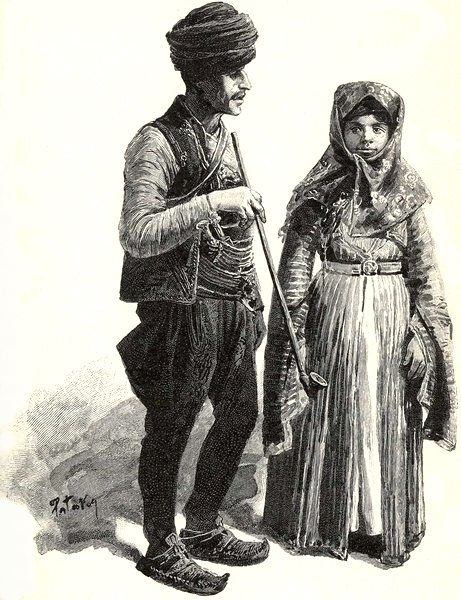
Illustration of Muslim Roma in Bosnia (c.1900)

In Europe, Romani Muslims are largely concentrated in the Balkans. Most are cultural or nominal Muslims.

For the Muslim Romani communities that have resided in the region for centuries, the following histories apply for religious beliefs:

- Bulgaria: In northwestern Bulgaria and Sofia and Kyustendil, Islam is the dominant religion. In southwestern Bulgaria (Pirin Macedonia), Islam is the dominant religion.
- Romania: Muslim Roma Minority at the Dobruja.
- Greece: Muslim Roma in Western Thrace.
- Albania: All Romani people in Albania are thought to be Muslim.
- North Macedonia: The majority of Romani people believe in Islam.
- Serbia: in the disputed territory of Kosovo the vast majority of the Romani population is Muslim.
- Bosnia and Herzegovina: Islam is the dominant religion.
- Montenegro: Islam is the dominant religion.
- Croatia: Following World War II, a large number of Muslim Roma relocated to Croatia (the majority moved from Kosovo).
- Slovenia: A sizeable proportion of the Romani in Slovenia are Muslim.

In the Balkans, the Roma in North Macedonia and southern Serbia, including the disputed territory of Kosovo, have been particularly active in Islamic mystical brotherhoods (Sufism)—Muslim Romani migrants to Western Europe and America have brought these traditions with them.

The Ashkali and Balkan Egyptians are a Muslim ethnic group in the Balkans. Whether or not they are fully Romani is disputed, but Romani and Ashkali groups generally do not consider each other fully gadje.

Romani people in Turkey include the Turkish-speaking Roma, as well as Roma who retain indigenous languages like Sevlengere.

In the Middle East, the Dom people are a closely-related ethnocultural group to the Rom, and share a common origin. The Dom are also a diasporic, historically-itinerant community with their origins in the Indian Subcontinent. Their language, Domari, is closely related to Romani languages.

In Iran, the Zargari Romani practice Shia Islam. They speak Zargari Romani, which is descended from Balkan Romani. Other Romani and Domari people from Greater Persia and Central Asia speak Persian Kowli.

==== Other regions ====
The majority of Romanies in Central and Eastern Europe are Eastern Orthodox, Muslim or Roman Catholic. Ukraine and Russia contain Muslim Romani populations, who generally trace their faith back to the Ottoman period in the Balkans. Some of them settled on the Crimean peninsula during the 17th and 18th centuries before migrating to Ukraine, southern Russia and the Povolzhie (along the Volga River). They are recognised for their staunch preservation of the Romani language and identity.

Those in Western Europe and the United States are mostly Roman Catholic or Protestant. In southern Spain, many Roma are Pentecostal, but this is a small minority that has emerged in contemporary times.

The majority of the Romani diaspora in the Americas are Christian.

==== Evangelicalism ====
Since World War II, a number of Roma have become involved in Evangelical movements. For the first time, Roma became ministers and created their own, autonomous churches and missionary organizations. In some countries, the majority of Roma belong to Romani churches. This unexpected change has greatly contributed to a better image of Roma in society. The work they perform is seen as more legitimate, and they have begun to obtain legal permits for commercial activities.

==== Hinduism ====
The ancestors of the Romani people possibly followed the Hindu religion when they still lived in South Asia. This is supported by the Romani word for 'cross', trushul, which is the word which describes Shiva's trident (Trishul) and additionally folk tales and songs about Hindu-esque deities. A Hindu foundation means that the concept of Kuntari, a universal balance, is central to the people's spirituality. Kuntari means that all things belong in the universe according to their natural place. If something does not fit into its natural place, it is considered to be out of balance, and therefore bad luck. For example, birds are supposed to fly, so flightless birds like hens are considered to be out of balance and bad luck. For this reason, Christian Roma traditionally do not eat hens' eggs, with the exception of the Muslim Roma, who eat eggs and even have special recipes for them.

Roma also believed in the concept of Kintala, which is almost identical to Karma except one's actions in life only influence the reincarnation; the bad happenings are not caused by sins of a previous life, rather by bad Dji and unclean spirits (the Necuxa).

The concept of Dji is one's spiritual energy which must be kept in balance by following Marime and other spiritual laws. The better a person one is and the more balanced their Dji is, the better life they will reincarnate into.

Some also worshipped the spirits of their ancestors, while the Christian Roma were completely opposed to anything that messes with the dead.

Some Roma believed in a god who is one with the universe and manifests themselves in the forms of many deities:

- Kali Sarah / Bari O Devli – goddess of roma, fate, reincarnation
- Bar o Devel / Siv – god of power and music
- O Shion – goddess of wealth and luck
- Amari O Devli – goddess of beauty, love and fertility
- Bibiyaku / Aunt Bibi – goddess of family, children and the home
- Vaju – god of the wind and travel
- Olabibi – goddess of illness and healing
- Alakoh – goddess of the moon and sacred laws

The Roma clans and tribes followed plenty of other gods and practiced many variation of this faith system, there is no one name for a god or one rule as each group had a unique variation.

==== Buddhism ====
Theravada Buddhism linked to the Dalit Buddhist movement of B.R. Ambedkar has spread amongst a very small minority of Romani people, mostly concentrated in Hungary.

==== Judaism ====
Some Romani people converted to Judaism through a Jewish spouse.

== Fortune-telling ==
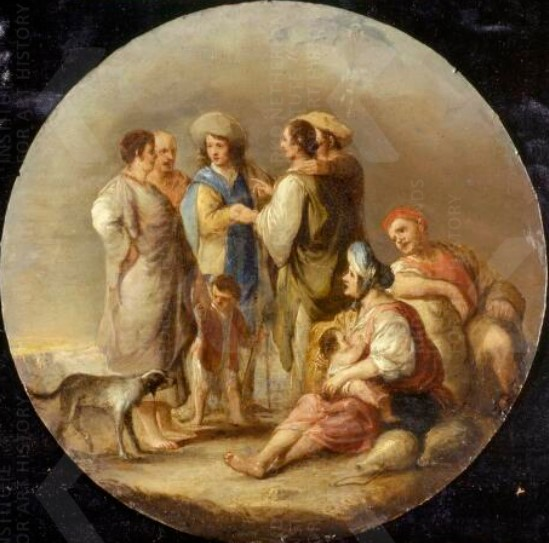
Gypsies reading the hand of a young traveler by Cornelis de Wael

There are records of Romani women practicing fortune-telling dating back centuries, using techniques such as palm reading. It often served as a means of income. It was typically passed from mother to daughter. In 1747 and later again in 1824, palm-reading was made illegal in Britain, thereby forcing it to become a covert practice. Romani fortune tellers were traditionally known as drabardi. The fortune-telling trade was directed at non-Romani (known as Gadje or Gorjas), and rarely, if ever, practiced amongst Romani themselves.

The misbelief that Romani people have psychic powers (e.g. fortune-teller) is a stereotype, sometimes still present to this day, and some romantics attribute the invention of the Tarot cards to them.

== Dance ==
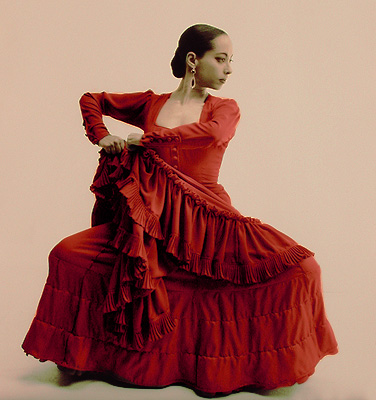

Some traditional Romani dances have distant roots in Indian dance. A Romani dance in the eastern Balkans, with origins in the Indian subcontinent, is the snake dance.

Belly dance is performed by the Romani people in Turkey.

== Music ==
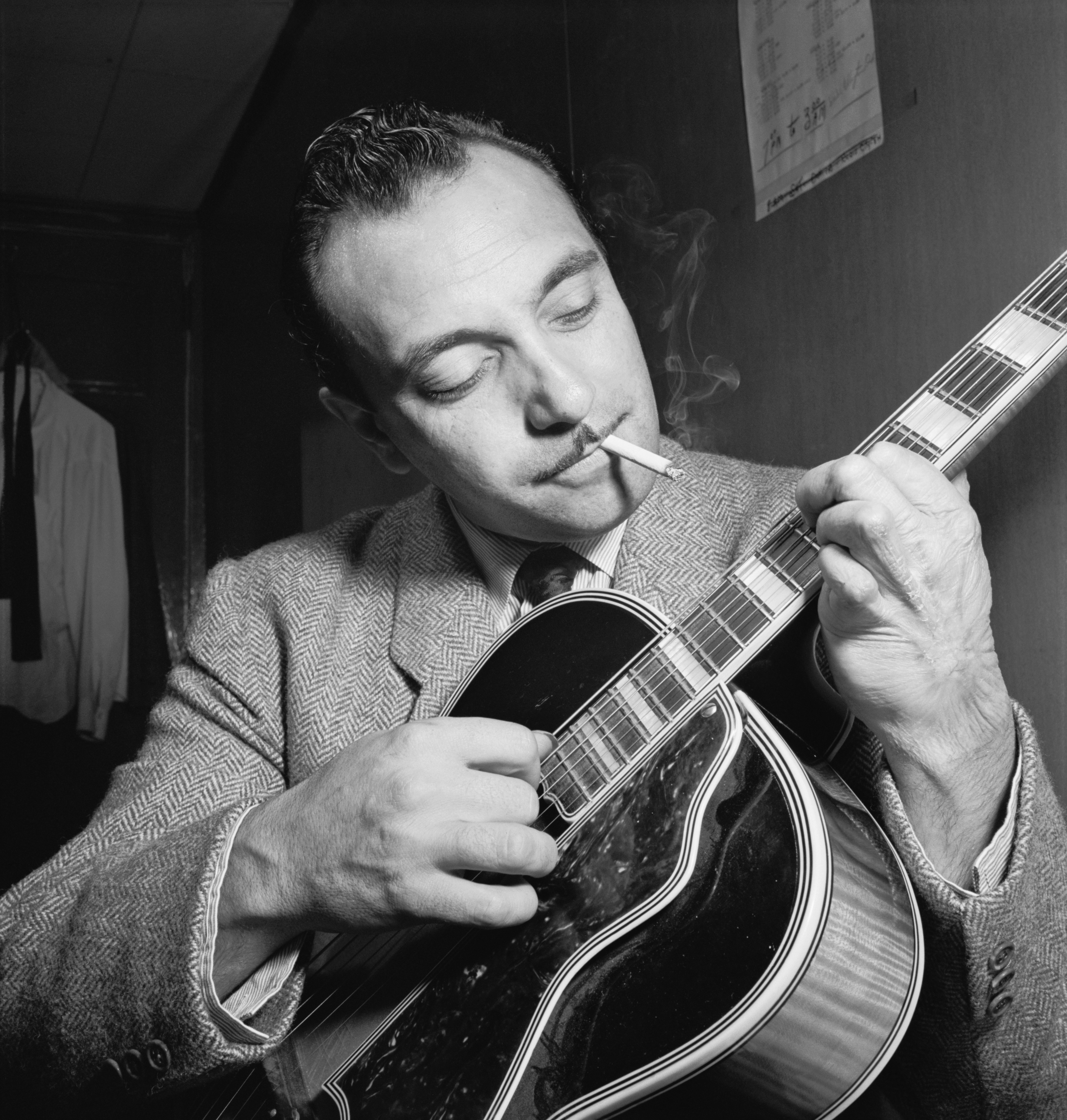
Django Reinhardt

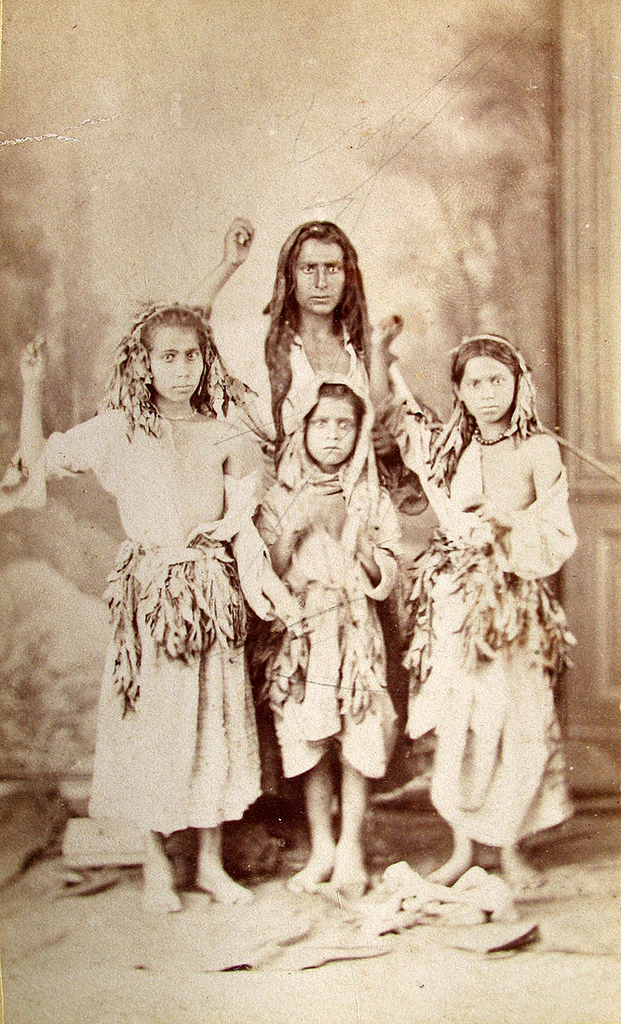
Romani woman and children singing in Bucharest (1869)

As the Roma traveled to other countries from India to Europe, the Roma introduced many influences in their music, beginning with their Indian roots and adding elements of Greek, Persian, Turkish, Romanian, Czech and Slavic influence, as well as Western European such as German, French and Spanish influences.

The lăutari who perform at traditional Romanian weddings are virtually all Roma, although their music draws heavily from a vast variety of ethnic traditions—for example Romanian, Turkish and Slavic—as well as Romani traditions. Probably the most internationally prominent contemporary performer in the lăutari tradition is Taraful Haiducilor. Zdob şi Zdub, one of the most prominent rock bands in Moldova, although not Roma themselves, draw heavily on Romani music, as do Spitalul de Urgenţă in Romania.

Flamenco music and dance came from the Roma in Spain; the distinctive sound of Romani music has also strongly influenced bolero, jazz, and Cante Jondo in Europe. European-style manouche jazz is still widely practised among the original creators (the Romani People); one who acknowledged this artistic debt was Django Reinhardt.

Manele is a genre of urban Romanian ethno-pop that fuses traditional local Romanian music with influences from Romani, southern Balkan, Middle Eastern, and global popular music. Notable manele artists of Romani descent include Tzancă Uraganu, Florin Salam, Jador, Babasha, Robert Lele Durmus, Nicolae Guță, Dani Mocanu, and Sandu Ciorba.

=== Classical music ===
Romani music is very important in Eastern European cultures such as Hungary, Russia, and Romania. Performance practices by Romani musicians have influenced European classical composers such as Franz Liszt and Johannes Brahms.

== Language ==
The Romani language is spoken by millions of Romani people throughout the world. It is of the Indo-Aryan branch but has considerable influence from Persian, Armenian and Byzantine Greek. Many Romani people can speak two or more languages. There are a number of dialects of the Romani language throughout Europe. Although is generally considered not considered an official language, Romani is an official language the Romani-run municipality of Šuto Orizari, in North Macedonia.

== Observances ==
Each June, Gypsy, Roma & Traveller History Month is celebrated in London. International Romani Day is a holiday celebrated in Europe on 8 April, especially in Bulgaria, Hungary, Romania and other parts of Central and Eastern Europe. World Roma Festival is a festival celebrated in Prague. Ederlezi and Kakava are holidays celebrated in spring by the Turkish Roma.

Romani Christians celebrate Christmas on 25 December and Easter in either April or May. Romani adults may also fast on these holidays and may eat special foods for these holidays.

Romani people in Serbia celebrate Bibi and Bibijako Djive.

World Day of Romani Language is celebrated every 5 November.

== Symbols ==
Flag of the Romani people, featuring the Roma chakra in the center.

=== Flag ===
The Romani flag serves as the international emblem for the Romani community. It was designed by the General Union of the Roma of Romania in 1933. The flag's design initially had two horizontal bars, the bottom being green the top being blue; green representing the earth and terrestrial values, and blue representing the heavens and spiritual values. The flag was adopted as the common flag for Romani people at the inaugural World Romani Congress in London in 1971 with the addition of the Roma chakra. The elements of the flag are inter-related, representing the Romani people's path of growth in the physical and spiritual planes throughout life.

=== Chakra ===
The Roma chakra serves as a significant emblem of the identity and culture of the Romani people. The symbol, resembling a Hindu chakra, is a red wagon wheel with 16 spokes. It resembles the wheels of vardo or trailers which served as a home for travelling Roma families, representing the tradition of Romani travellers. The wheel's red colour represents blood that many Roma shed during World War II and those who suffered during the Romani genocide. However, the colour may vary by country or organization, such as in the flag of the Roma movement in Croatia, where the chakra is gold-coloured.

=== Slogan ===
The Romani community employs the slogan "Opre Roma," translating to "Stand Up, Roma!" in the Romani language. This phrase was initially introduced during the Cold War at the inaugural World Romani Congress held on 8 April 1971.

=== Anthem ===
The Romani anthem was established in 1971 during the World Romani Congress. This anthem draws its inspiration from the folk song "Gyelem, Gyelem," with the lyrics attributed to Yugoslav Rum and Zarko Jovanovic.

== Entertainment ==
There exist four well-known Romani theatres in the world, Romen Theatre, Romance Theatre, Romanothan and Phralipe, and also many small theatres.

== Museums ==
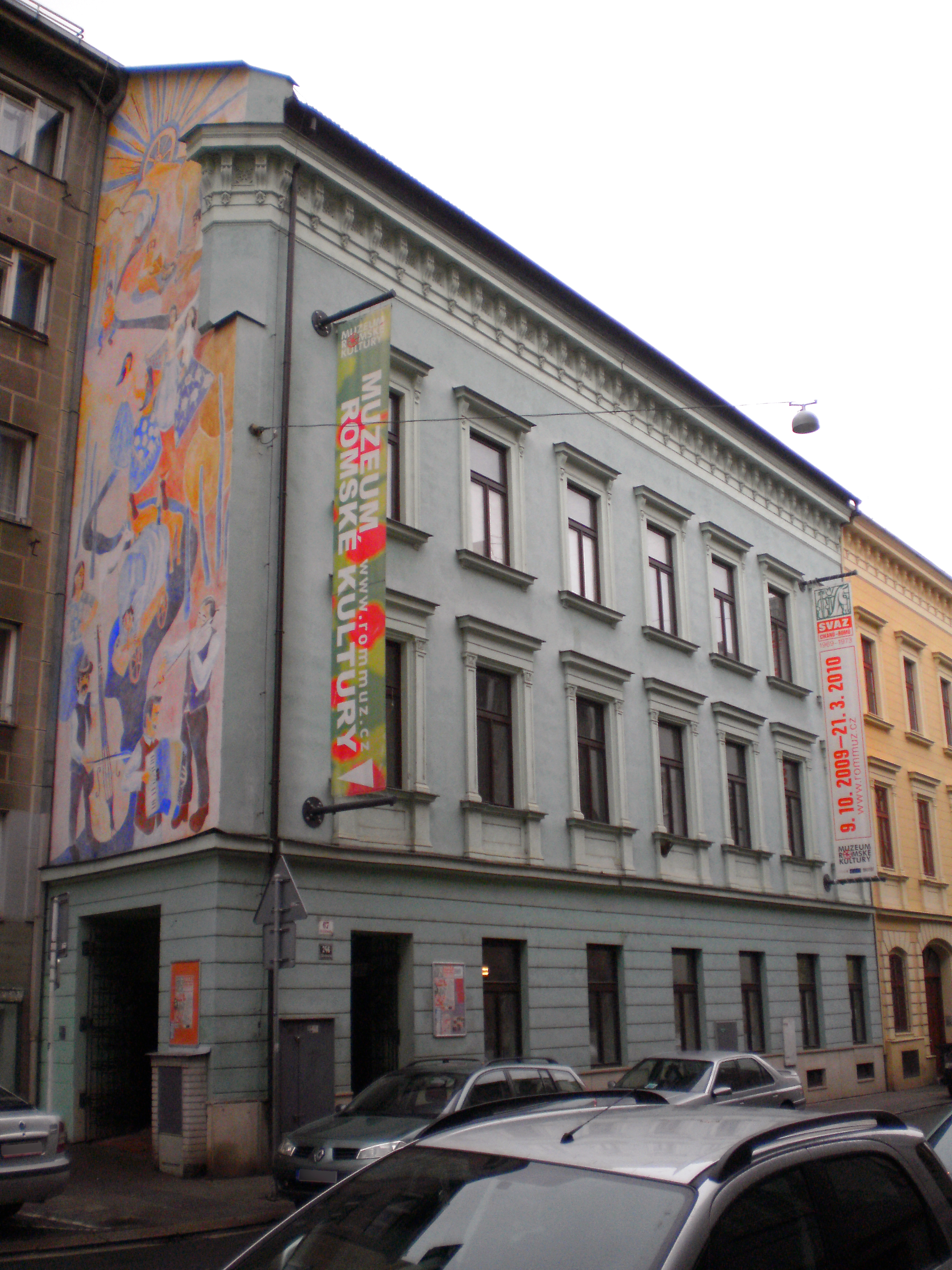
Museum of Romani Culture in Brno

There are some Romani museums in Europe.

The Museum of Romani Culture is located in Brno in the Czech Republic.

== Cuisine ==
Some Romani people do not eat food prepared by non-Romani.

Horse meat is forbidden by Christian Romani. Any Christian Romani who eats horse meat, are punished and banished from their tribe. Cat meat and dog meat are also forbidden and are considered unclean.

Stews are common. Stuffed cabbage is popular among Romani in the Balkans. Berries, vegetables, mushrooms, game and fowl are favored by some Romani. Hedgehogs were historically popular among some Romani.

There is a Romani restaurant called Romani Kafenava in Maribor, Slovenia. Rabbit stew is a Romani favorite. Other Romani dishes are fried bread dishes, including xaritsa (fried cornbread), pufe (fried wheat bread) and bogacha (baked bread). A Romani dessert is pirogo, a sweet noodle casserole similar to Jewish kugel made with raisins, cream cheese, and butter.

== Etiquette ==
Romani individuals are known for their sociable nature and often embrace spontaneous visits from relatives, neighbors, or friends as opportunities for social interaction. Their greetings are warm and include expressions of goodwill and wishes for good health. Generosity, particularly in the form of gift-giving, is regarded as a commendable trait; family members are willing to support one another and friends with financial assistance or other resources, such as food, clothing, or transportation via car or horse when necessary. Young people hold elders in high esteem, both within their families and in the broader community. They appreciate the wisdom of seniors. Referring to them as "old man" and "old woman." Both being terms that convey respect. The youth actively seek the counsel of elders for conflict resolution or guidance, demonstrating their respect by serving them first, allowing them to speak before others, and granting them the final word in serious discussions.

== Medicine ==
Romanian Roma use parsley leaves to heal bruises. Roma suffering from illness often seek treatment from a Romani doctor, an elderly Roma who uses traditional medicines such as herbs. Roma may refuse to seek medical help from non-Roma and use healers, magic, prayer or herbal remedies for illnesses. A drabarni is a Romani female healer. Many Romani classify illness into either romane nasvalimata (natural to Romani people such as heart problems, rashes, anxiety) or gadzikane nasvalimata (the result of contact with non- Roma, such as sexually transmitted diseases).

== Health ==
As many Roma are barred from receiving adequate healthcare as a result of discrimination in many countries in Europe, the general health status among Romani people is considerably poorer than non-Romani populations. High mortality rates is associated with Romani people in Europe. In Italy, estimates suggest that infant mortality rate among Roma babies is nearly three times higher than that of the national average. In addition, health indicators for Roma people – particularly female Roma – are often worse than for other groups in similarly disadvantaged socioeconomic positions.

Romani people suffer from poorer mental health. Relatively high rates of bipolar disorder, schizophrenia, depression and anxiety, and suicide are found among the Roma. This is consequently caused by the fact they have been ostracized by other ethnic groups for much of their existence, living in poor living conditions among their comparably wealthier European and American counterparts, a lack of awareness and education on mental health, and a restricted access to proper healthcare.

Romani people have lower access to food, resulting in malnutrition and stunted growth, despite living in developed countries. Romani people are also more likely to partake in risky behaviours, including drug abuse, alcohol abuse, and tobacco smoking. In Europe and the Americas, both Roma men and women have significantly higher smoking rates than respective populations, and are more likely to die from preventable smoking-related diseases such as cardiovascular diseases and many cancers. Alcohol consumption rate is also high among the Roma.

== Art ==
Art among Romani people is important. It is associated with mobility, travelling, trading, creating transportable objects and music.

== Fashion ==
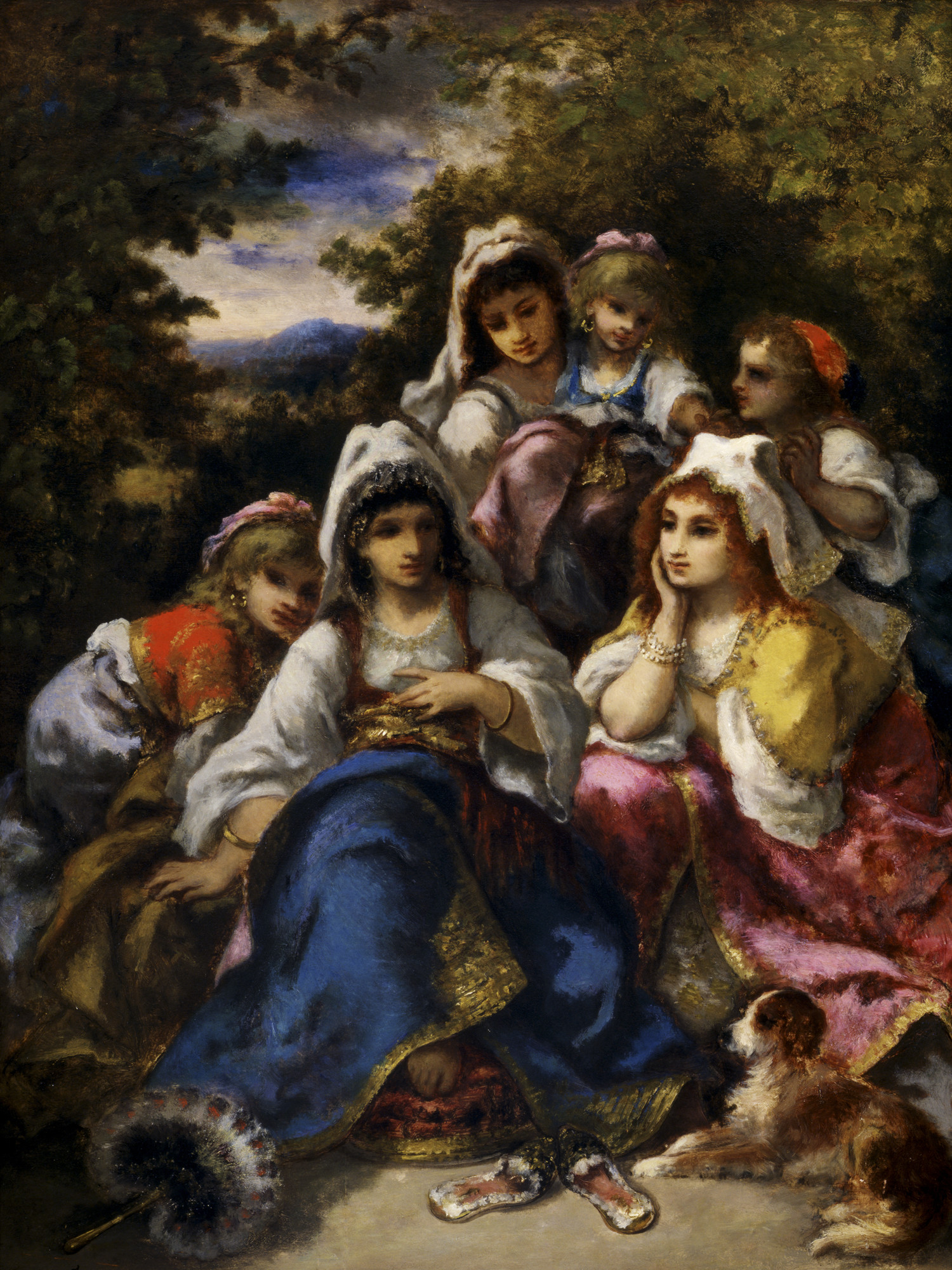
The Gypsy Princesses, a painting by Narcisse Virgilio Díaz (c.1865-1870)

Turkish Roma traditionally wear Ottoman pants whereas as Christian Roma traditionally wear long skirts.

In most traditional Romani communities, Romani women tend to wear gold bracelets and gold necklaces and headscarves. Traditionally, in southeastern Europe, the headscarves were sometimes decorated with golden coins.

== Literature ==
Romani literature is written by Romani people. Romani literature includes both oral traditions and written pieces created by Romani individuals. It delves into Romani culture, challenges, and identity, often confronting the idealized and detrimental stereotypes that are commonly perpetuated by non-Romani writers.

== Folklore ==
Romani people have their own ethnic hero. Among the Vlach Roma, it is Mundro Salamon or Wise Solomon. Other Romani groups call this hero O Godjiaver Yanko. Among the Welsh Kale, he is Merlinos (the Wizard), taken from Celtic folklore.

Romani people in Slovakia believe in the evil eye.

The Romani community hold beliefs in vampires and werewolves.

== Sports ==
Boxing is popular among Roma.

== Politics ==
The involvement of Roma in politics is increasing; however, it continues to be impeded by systemic underrepresentation, bias, and electoral manipulation. Although millions of Romani individuals reside throughout Europe, activists encounter the dual challenge of participating in mainstream political parties versus establishing ethnic-based political coalitions, which are frequently obstructed by the community's geographic distribution.

== Professions ==
Some Romani occupations are crafts like metalworking, playing music, animal trading, and fortune-telling.

== Film ==
Romani people have their own films. A Romani film is a cinematic piece that focuses on the culture, history, or experiences of Romani individuals. These films frequently delve into themes such as nomadism, the preservation of culture, and the systemic discrimination that the Roma have encountered throughout history. Tony Gatlif is known for creating numerous films that highlight Roma culture.

== Education ==
Generally, Romani people are less educated than other people in the country where they live. Generally speaking, 10% of Romani people, 20% of Romani boys and 25% of Romani girls are illiterate. The average literacy rate in europe is 98.77%.

In England, 60% of all pupils reached the expected standard in all of English reading, writing and mathematics. Of children identified as Gypsy/Roma, 18% met the expected standard. For those identified as Travellers of Irish Heritage, the figure was 21%. As is common across a range of education indicators, girls outperformed boys. 19% of Gypsy/ Roma girls, and 22% of Traveller of Irish Heritage girls reached the expected standard compared to 16% of Gypsy/ Roma boys, and 19% of Traveller of Irish Heritage boys. 31% of state-funded school pupils identified as Travellers of Irish Heritage attained GCSEs in English and maths at grade 4 or above – which is described as a 'standard pass'. The figure for pupils identified Gypsy/Roma was lower, at 16%. Nationally, 65% of state-funded school pupils attained these qualifications. The total number of pupils identified as Traveller of Irish heritage and Gypsy/ Roma at the end of the secondary phase, key stage four, is very small. In the summer 2023 DfE data, there were around 1,400 Gypsy/ Roma pupils and 190 Travellers of Irish Heritage at the end of key stage four, out of around 607,000 pupils overall.

For Bulgaria in 2011 the share of Romani with university degree reached 0.3%, while 6.9% have secondary education; the same share was 22.8%/47.6% for Bulgarians. (Note: In 2011 the share of Romani with university degree reached 0.3%, while 6.9% have secondary education; the same share was 22.8%/47.6% for Bulgarians.)

== Nomadism ==
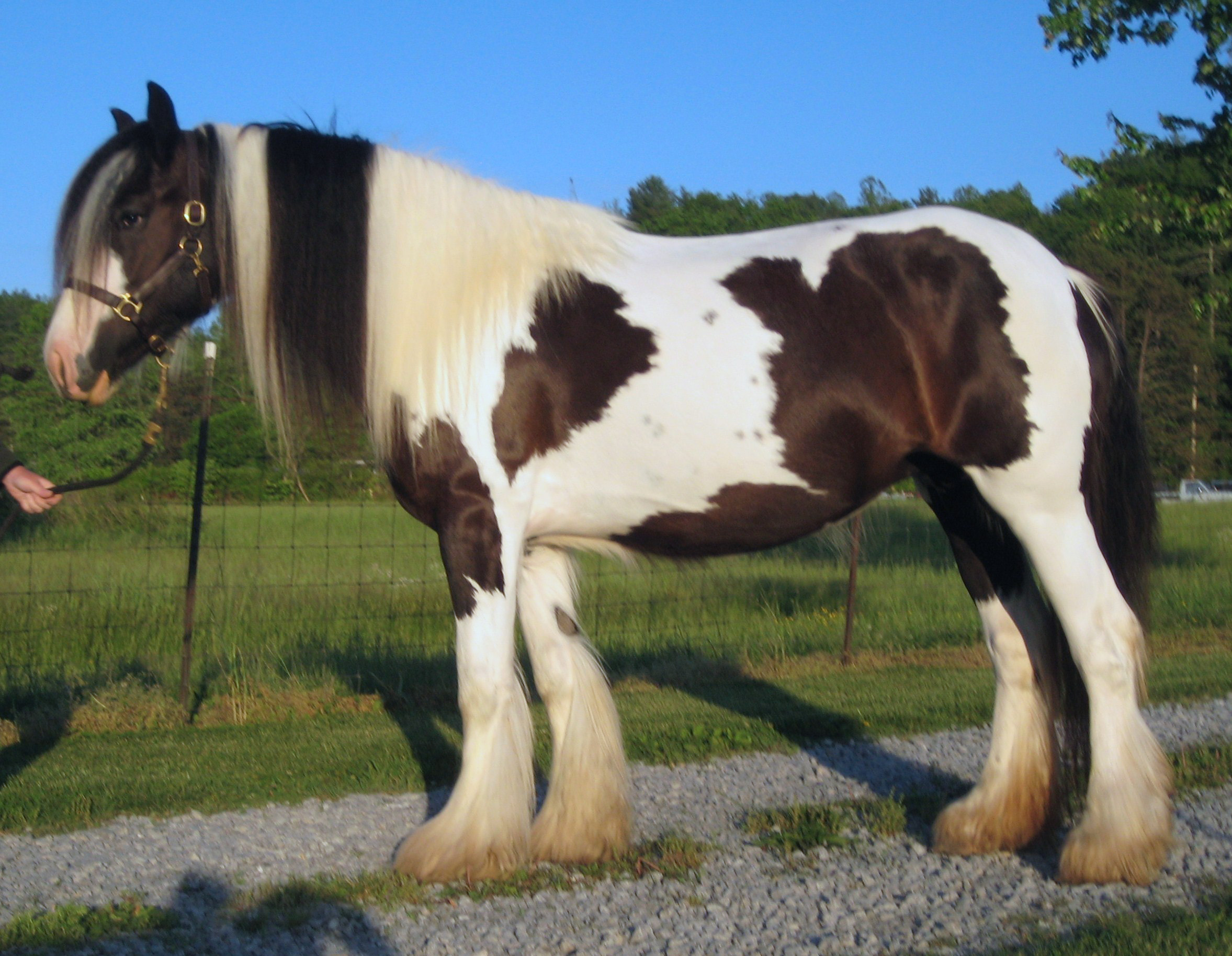
Gypsy horse

The Roma traditionally travelled with wagons pulled by horses and donkeys. The Gypsy Cob is the most popular breed to pull vardo wagons.

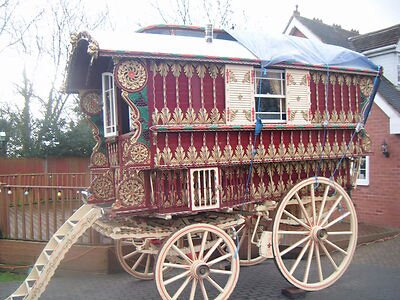

== Roma futurism ==
Roma Futurism is an artistic movement that integrates elements of science fiction, the historical experiences of the Romani people, fantasy, Romani perspectives, magical realism, and innovative technology, alongside magical practices and healing rituals.

== Relations with other people ==
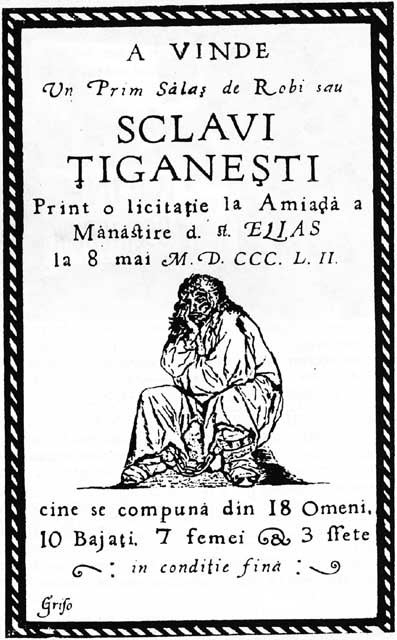
An 1852 Wallachian poster advertising an auction of Romani slaves

There are still tensions between Roma and the majority population around them. Common tropes are that Roma steal and live off social welfare and residents often reject Romani encampments. This has led to Roma being described as "perhaps the most hated minority in Europe." In the UK, nomadic people in Britain (consisting mostly of Irish Travellers, but also some nomadic Romani people) became a 2005 general election issue, with Michael Howard, the then-leader of the Conservative Party promising to review the Human Rights Act 1998. This law, which absorbs the European Convention on Human Rights into UK primary legislation, is seen by some to permit the granting of retrospective planning permission for nomadic people. Severe population pressures and the paucity of greenfield sites have led to nomadic people purchasing land and setting up residential settlements almost overnight.

Irish Travellers and nomadic Romanies argued in response that thousands of retrospective planning permissions are granted in Britain in cases involving non-Irish Traveller and non-Romani applicants each year and that statistics showed that 90% of planning applications by Roma and travellers were initially refused by local councils, compared with a national average of 20% for other applicants, potentially disproving claims of preferential treatment favouring Roma. They also argued that the root of the problem was that many traditional stopping-places had been barricaded off and that legislation passed by the previous Conservative government had effectively criminalised their communities by removing local authorities' responsibility to provide sites, thus leaving them with no option but to purchase unregistered new sites themselves.

Law enforcement agencies in the United States hold regular conferences on the Roma and similar nomadic groups.

In Denmark, there was much controversy when the city of Helsingør decided to put all Romani students in special classes in its public schools. The classes were later abandoned after it was determined that they were discriminatory and the Romani students were put back in regular classes.

Romani people have traditionally avoided gadjo because non-Romani are believed to be polluting and defile the Romani world.

The Greek Doctor A. G. Paspati made the statement in his Book from 1860, that Turks often married Romani woman, and that the Rumelian Romani dialect is nearly lost due to the rise of entirely Turkish-speaking Romani people in the Balkans. In 1915, Ernest Gilliat-Smith compared Turkish-speaking Roma in Bulgaria with very poor Turks rather than Romani people. The French orientalist Henri Bourgeois referred to the Turkish-speaking Roma as Pseudo Chingiane, especially the newspaper Laço who was published in 1910 by Emin Resa.

=== Roma in Eastern Europe ===
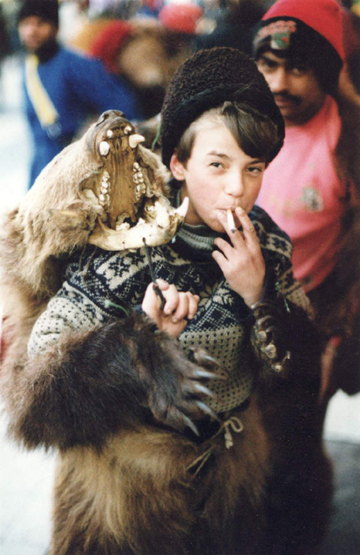
Romani boy in bear costume, part of entertainer team for working Christmas crowds in Budapest, Hungary.

Many countries that were formerly part of the Eastern bloc and former Yugoslavia have substantial populations of Roma. The level of integration of Roma into society remains limited. In these countries, they usually remain on the margins of society, living in isolated, ghetto-like settlements (see Chánov). Only a small fraction of Romani children graduate from secondary schools, though numerous official efforts have been made, past and present, to compel their attendance. Roma frequently feel rejected by the state and the main population, creating another obstacle to their integration. Muslim Roma (Xoroxane/Khorokhane) in the Balkans adopted Islam during the Ottoman period.

In the Czech Republic, 75% of Romani children are educated in schools for people with learning difficulties and 70% are unemployed, compared with a national rate of 9%. In Hungary, 44% of Romani children are in special schools, while 74% of men and 83% of women are unemployed. In Slovakia, Romani children are 28 times more likely to be sent to a special school than non-Roma, while Romani unemployment stands at 80%.

In 2004, Lívia Járóka and Viktória Mohácsi of Hungary became the two current Romani Members of the European Parliament. The first Romani MEP was Juan de Dios Ramírez Heredia of Spain.

Seven Eastern European states launched the Decade of Roma Inclusion initiative in 2005, aimed at improving the socioeconomic conditions and status of their Romani minorities.

== See also ==
- Flag of the Romani people
- Gadjo (non-Romani)
- Museum of Romani Culture
- Rom baro (tribal leader)
- Romani folklore
- Romani dress
- Romani studies
- Romani cuisine
- Anti-Romani sentiment
