= Romani people in Canada =

Total population
- 6,545 (by ancestry, 2021 Census)

Regions with significant populations
- Ontario, Quebec, Alberta, Manitoba

Languages
- Canadian English, Canadian French, Romani, various Para-Romani languages

Religion
- Christianity, Sunni Islam

Related ethnic groups
- Romani, Roma in the United States, South Asian Canadians

The Romani people in Canada are citizens of Canada who are of Romani descent. According to the 2021 Canadian census there were 6,545 Canadians who claimed Romani ancestry. They are sometimes referred as "gypsies", but that is considered to be a racial slur.

== History ==
=== Migration to Canada during the 1990s ===
When Romani refugees were allowed into Canada in 1997, a protest was staged by 25 people, including neo-Nazis, in front of the motel where the refugees were staying. The protesters held signs that said, for examples, "Honk if you hate Gypsies," "Canada is not a Trash Can," and "GST — Gypsies Suck Tax." (The last is a reference to Canada's Goods and Services Tax, also known as GST.) The protesters were charged with promoting hatred, and the case, R. v. Krymowski, reached the Supreme Court of Canada in 2005.

Following the influx of over 3,000 Czech Romani refugees to Canada in 1997 a community center was opened in Toronto, Ontario. The Roma Community Centre is a non-profit organization that is dedicated to providing community support to the Romani people in Canada. The organization was founded in 1997. The centre has also provided assistance to Romani refugees from the former Yugoslavia (Serbia, Croatia, North Macedonia, Montenegro, Bosnia, Slovenia, Kosovo), Czech Republic, Slovakia, Hungary, Romania, Albania, Ukraine, Poland, Portugal, Greece, Ireland, Bulgaria, and other countries with Roma populations. These refugees claimed to be fleeing discrimination and persecution against Romani in Europe. The centre has also denounced pejorative statements about Romani people in the Canadian media and has denounced antisemitism and racism. Canadian government reacted on the influx of Roma population by imposing visa requirements on all Czech citizens in 1997. Ever since then, the Romani asylum seekers' arrival to Canada virtually stopped, since they were not issued visas.

=== Recent ===
Starting in 2008, Romani immigration from Hungary began to increase. That year, Hungary fell into recession, and violence and discrimination against Roma increased. Many Roma in Hungary live in squalor. In 2011, Roma asylum seekers from Hungary numbered 4,400, but most of these claims were either rejected or withdrawn. Immigration Minister Jason Kenney was quoted as saying in 2012 "If they subsequently withdraw their own claim, they’re telling us that in fact they don’t need Canada’s protection, that they’re not victims of persecution, and that’s… a bogus claim. It’s a fake claim."

The government has since pushed to reduce Hungarian Roma immigration. In December 2012, Hungary was added to a list of "Safe Countries", which would make refugee claims harder.

On September 5, 2012, prominent Canadian commentator Ezra Levant broadcast a commentary "The Jew vs. the Gypsies" on The Source in which he accused the Romani people of being a group of criminals saying:

These are gypsies, a culture synonymous with swindlers. The phrase gypsy and cheater have been so interchangeable historically that the word has entered the English language as a verb: he gypped me. Well the gypsies have gypped us. Too many have come here as false refugees. And they come here to gyp us again and rob us blind as they have done in Europe for centuries … They’re gypsies. And one of the central characteristics of that culture is that their chief economy is theft and begging.

In March 2013, Levant apologized for his remarks, stating that "I attacked a particular group, and painted them all with the same brush. And to those I hurt, I'm sorry" and expressed hope that this "will serve as an example of what not to do when commenting on social issues." The Canadian Broadcast Standards Council (CBSC) subsequently ruled, in September 2013, that Levant's broadcast was “in violation of the Canadian Association of Broadcasters’ Code of Ethics and Equitable Portrayal Code,” and that his comments about the Roma were "abusive and unduly discriminatory against an ethnic group, and violated other provisions of the [code] regarding negative portrayal, stereotyping, stigmatization and degradation." The council noted that Levant had already issued two on-air apologies, and as such, he would not be ordered to issue another.

In March 2023, a Romani couple from Romania drowned while attempting to cross the Saint Lawrence River with their infant children. The family was ordered to be deported that same month, but decided to escape to the United States instead of heading back to Romania.

== Demography ==
=== Religion ===
Romani Canadian demography by religion
Religious group	2021 (Note: Religious breakdown proportions based on "Roma" ethnic or cultural origin response on the 2021 census.)	
Religious group	Pop.	%
Christianity	3,505	53.51%
Irreligion	2,555	39.01%
Judaism	70	1.07%
Islam	65	0.99%
Buddhism	40	0.61%
Indigenous spirituality	35	0.53%
Other	270	4.12%
Total Romani Canadian population	6,550	100%

== Prominent Romani Canadians ==
- Robi Botos – jazz musician
- Ronald Lee – writer
