= Gypsy Evangelical Mission in France (Life and Light) =

Gypsy Evangelical Mission in France (Light and Life)
- Mission évangélique des Tziganes de France (Vie et Lumière)
- Abbreviation: METF
- Classification: Protestant
- Orientation: Reformed, evangelical
- Region: Europe
- Headquarters: Nevoy, France
- Founder: Rev. Clément Le Cossec
- Origin: 1954
- Congregations: 404 in France
- Members: 130,000 in France, More than 1,500,000 in the worldwide

The Gypsy Evangelical Mission in France (Life and Light) (Mission évangélique des Tziganes de France (Vie et Lumière) is a Pentecostal church active among Roma founded by Clément Le Cossec, a very influential pastor.

It is one of the most dynamic modern churches, with more than 400 churches and over 130,000 in France as of 2025. It is the largest evangelical church in France and one of largest Protestant churches in the country.

The international section of the association Gypsy and Travelers International Evangelical Fellowship (GATIEF), presents in many countries, such as those in Asia, Russia and Eastern Europe, has nearly 1,500,000 members.

Life and Light has helped many destitute people around the world gain to access to education, water and has notably built infrastructure such has bridges, as well as boarding schools for orphans.

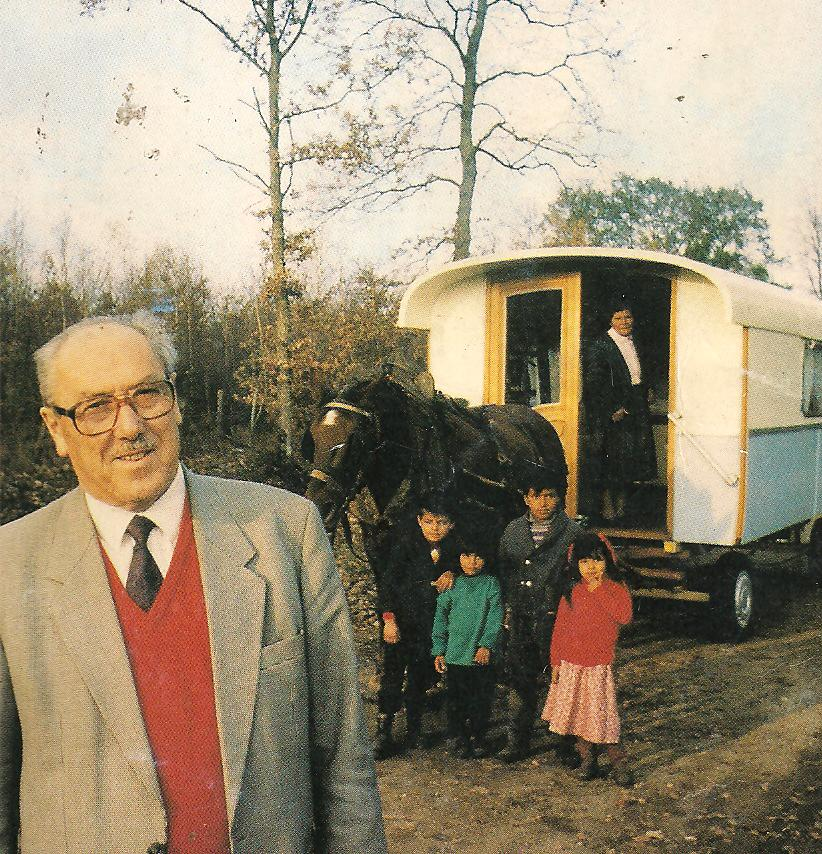
Clément Le Cossec, founder of Life and Light and a highly influential religious of the 20th century

== History ==
The denomination has its origins in a mission founded by the Pastor Clément Le Cossec, coming from a Catholic family with no connection whatsoever to nomadic communities, in 1952 in Brest. In 1954, the "Gospel Mission of the Gypsies of France" held its first annual national convention.

Clément Le Cossec is also a central member of the Assemblies of God and the founder of the Filadelfia Evangelical Church (Église évangélique Filadelfia). He is one of the most Protestant religious figures at the 20th century, as he was at the originator of one of the religious movements currently experiencing the most growth. The Reverend Le Cossec, in 1976, was among the few influentials pastors who participated in a meeting at the Vatican under the auspices of Pope Paul VI as part of the dialogue between Catholics and the Pentecostals. Present at the meeting, among others, are David du Plessis, J. Rodman Williams, Basil Meeking, Michael Harper, Jean Leclercq and Ignace de la Potterie.

In 2015, it would have 100,000 members and 260 churches. In 2025, it would have more than 130,000 members and 400 churches.

The association is a member of the Protestant Federation of France.

It also is present in several countries outside Western Europe. In several countries the GEM faces persecution.

Each year, the association's annual gathering brings together between 20,000 and 40,000 people. It is one of the largest religious gathering in Europe.

The association has enabled many people to escape precarious living conditions. Trough its effort, water supply network have been built around the world, access to education has been made possible for many young people, notably in India, and several boarding schools, including some for orphans, have been established.

Each year, several hundred new pastors are trained by the association's Bible schools.

- Light and Life (Roma church based in the United Kingdom) has nothing to do with Life and Light
- References
