= Museum of Romani Culture =

Institution in Brno, Czech Republic

- Muzeum romské kultury

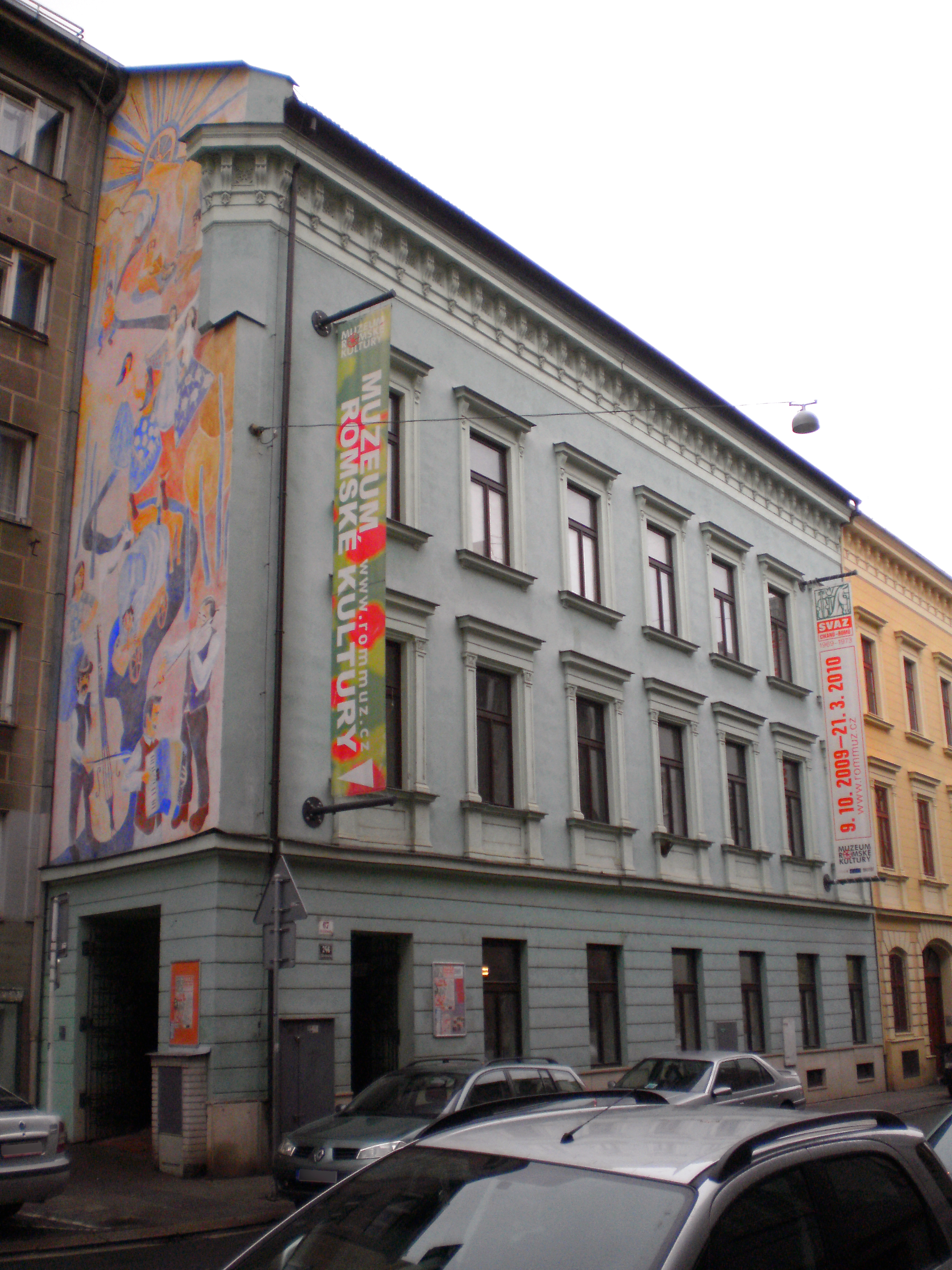
- The Museum of Romani Culture
- Interactive fullscreen map
- Established: 1991; 35 years ago
- Location: Bratislavská 67/246, Brno, Czech Republic, 602 00
- Coordinates: 49°12′02.52″N 16°37′26.76″E
- Website: www.rommuz.cz/cs/

The Museum of Romani Culture (Czech: Muzeum romské kultury) is an institution dedicated to the history and culture of the Romani people. It is situated in Brno, Czech Republic.

== History ==
The Museum was founded in 1991 by members of the Czech Romani intelligentsia, led by Jana Horváthová, in the period of freedom which followed the Velvet Revolution in Czechoslovakia. During its early years, its location moved from one place to another and the institution struggled with financial problems. In December 2000, it moved to its present building on Bratislavská Street in Brno, which is the centre of the local Romani community. The museum is now financed from the state budget.

== Library ==
The library sources include important research papers and prints, Romani literature, news articles in Czech and Slovakian (regarding to Roma), news articles about Roma in foreign languages, overview of legislations, printed discussions and debates.

== Roma and Sinti Center in Prague ==
In September 2020, the newly emerging specialized workplace of the museum was introduced - the Roma and Sinti Center in Prague. The first center of this type in the capital is to become a space for education and exhibition activities and will function as an information center and a place for community and social gatherings. It will be built in a First Republic villa in Prague's Dejvice at Velvarská 1. The Museum of Romani Culture has been the administrator of the building since 2019. The family house was designed by architects Arnošt (Ernst) Mühlstein and Victor Fürpro in 1937 for Leo František Perutz, a textile entrepreneur. The building will be renovated and purposefully completed, the work is expected to be completed in 2022. The center is to be opened on March 1, 2023.

== See also ==
- Romani society and culture
