= Jimmy Marks (born 1945) =

American activist

Marks in 2004

Jimmy Marks (February 14, 1945 – June 27, 2007) was a Romani American who lived in Spokane, Washington. He referred to himself as a "Rom".

Marks became widely known in 1986 when the Spokane police department raided his home, performed searches, and confiscated property ($1.6 million in cash and $160,000 in jewelry) without a valid search warrant. The police claimed that 35 items were from burglaries.

The Markses claimed that the cash was being held for other Romani families who did not trust banks. Marks brought suit against the city of Spokane for $59 million, and after 11 years the case was settled out of court for $1.43 million. The lawsuit has been cited as a landmark case in the civil rights of Romani Americans.

Due to bringing too much exposure to the Romani community of Spokane, Marks was deemed marime by the community and therefore an outcast. He was not invited to social events such as weddings and funerals and was refused food when he arrived uninvited.
