= Kris (Romani court) =

Romani traditional court

Krisi (Romani: kris) or Krisi-Romani is a traditional court for conflict resolution in the culture of Vlax branch of the Romani people. The term derives from the Greek language, "κρίση" (judgment). It is a key institution for enforcing the Romani Code (Romani: romano zakono; zakonuri) within Romanipen. It developed in the area of present-day Romania, during the times of the slavery, as a judicial institution of the local Romanies, in order to enforce the community cohesion and its internal balance. After the abolition, from the half of the 19th century onwards, many Vlax Romanies emigrated in the rest of the world, bringing with them the krisi as part of their cultural luggage. More or less formal proceedings exist also among other Romani branches. Some non-Vlax Romanies adopted this institution, like the Drzara from Sweden (originally from Serbia), in contact with the local Kalderash.

== Proceedings ==
The kris covers issues involving only Romani parties, since those involving also non-Romani parties are dealt by non-Romani institutions. In the Romani dispute resolution, it is used as the last resort. Many unsettled issues (if their gravity would not require a kris obviously from the start) are dealt informally through involvement of other members from the local communities. This may take the shape of a divano, an informal gathering of clan leaders of the conflicting parties and other local influential and respected Romanies (the presence of the parties themselves is optional). If they consider a certain settlement possible, this amounts only to a recommendation. If the parties still do not agree and the issue remains unsettled, the kris is convened as the formal instrument for the dispute resolutions.

Although customs vary according to local tradition, the basic form of the kris involves the conflicting parties making their appeals to the krisnitorya (singular: krisnitori, also in other variants, krisnatory, krisari, krisatore), respected Romanies appointed by communal acclamation to preside over the kris. The number of krisnitorya is odd, usually between five and eleven. Other members of the group not directly involved in the conflict may participate by presenting their own statements on the nature of the conflict, or on the character of the involved parties. Formerly, only married males were allowed to argue a case or present evidence at a kris, with females' and unmarried males' interests being represented by their married male relatives. However, in the modern era it is more common for married women to take an active part in a kris as one of the conflicting parties, or as a witness. In some areas, for example in the United States, women have begun to serve as krisnitori. The debates are kept only in Romani language, with a legal register, otherwise unused in the daily speech. In order to enforce the veracity of the communication, various oaths are taken in the name of the ancestors (Romani: mule) or other culturally powerful images.

The judgements of the kris are designed to maintain the integrity of the Romani community and uphold the Romanipen. Its proceedings are oriented to reinforce the kintala (balance), an important notion of the Romanipen. Considering that there is no absolute truth (as a shame society, in contrast with the usually local non-Romani guilt societies) and each party has its own truth, the krisnitorya seek mainly to restore the mutual respect between the involved parties. Their final decisions should consider a future harmony, since, according to its success and durability in time, the Romani community will consider whether they keep being qualified krisnitorya. If it is concluded that an imbalance happened and its nature and gravity make very difficult restoring the balance with reconciliation, then reparations and punishments are also considered. These may range from fines (Romani: glaba) paid by the guilty to the injured party, to the guilty party being declared marime ('unclean') for a period of time, and banished (Romani: shudine/chhudine) from the community. The period of time may be fixed, or until the guilty will pay the fine or will restore a former status quo. The most extreme sentence is for a Romani person to be declared marime for all time, and thus permanently excluded from the Romani community, a horrific fate amongst the Roma. In former times, the death sentence was also a possible punishment in some Romani groups, although it is not known to have been practiced for a very long time. If all parties are found guilty and fines are paid, usually these are given to the poor Romanies. Also the punishment may include unpaid work for the local Romani community. The injured party, also in order to reinforce the balance and restore the harmony with the guilty, may renounce a part of the reparations they are entitled to. The decisions of the kris are definitive (there are no higher Romani courts) and they are enforced by the moral pressure of the Romani community.

== Non-Romani contexts ==
Non-Romani authorities have not recognized the kris despite voices that call for otherwise, reminiscent of the Canadian approach to integrating the Aboriginal courts in its legal system. In Romania, in January 2008, about 500 krisnitorya initiated the European Committee of the Romani Krisnitorya. In Canada, the Romani activist Ronald Lee has sought to use the kris as a way of promoting greater understanding between the Romani and non-Romani communities.

There are also references to the kris in popular culture. For example, in 1997, filmmaker Bence Gyöngyössy made the film Romani kris - Cigánytörvény, which was also Hungary's submission for Best Foreign Language Film at the Academy Awards that year. In 2007, Laurenţiu Calciu produced the documentary film Judecătorul – O Krisnitori, about the life of Marin Sută Constantin, a krisnitori from the Obreja neighborhood of Târgu Jiu. In addition, the Kris is also portrayed in multiple episodes of the Hulu original Shut Eye, in an effort to resolve conflict between characters in Romani families.

== See also ==
- Conflict resolution
- Romani society and culture
