= Light and Life =

Evangelical Christian movement

Light and Life is a Romani-led evangelical (Pentecostal) Christian movement that claims "up to 40% of British Gypsies" are part of it. Adherents pray for the sick, do not drink alcohol, or engage in fortune-telling, instead taking part in Charismatic prayer (including speaking in tongues).

The movement's founders include Jackie Boyd, a Romani Gypsy.

As of December 2015, Light and Life has 33 churches and 20,000 followers.

== See also ==
- Gypsy Evangelical Mission in France (Life and Light)
