= Civil awareness =

Civil awareness, often referred to as civic awareness, is the ability to understand people's rights, duties, and roles as members of a community or society. It focuses on how government works, how laws are made, and how citizens can participate in public life to improve their neighborhood or country.

When categorizing educational programs, grant funding, or community initiatives, civil awareness is often differentiated from other topics, such as domestic violence, LGBTQ issues, disability, environment, and health. Although all of them affect society, they belong to different social and policy domains. Nevertheless, civil awareness serves as the foundation for addressing these other issues. For example, citizens use their civil awareness to advocate for better health policies, push for anti-discrimination laws, or vote for political office holders who fund domestic violence shelters. Furthermore, in countries undergoing decolonization, civic awareness can be useful in the process of empowering citizens.

Civil awareness has three core focuses:

- Governance and Law: how local and national governments operate, how to vote and engage with elected officials.
- Community responsibility: active participation in public spaces, such as volunteering, attending town hall meetings, and respecting shared rules.
- Constitutional rights: information about basic legal protections, such as freedom of speech and the right to peaceful assembly.

== See also ==
- Activism
- Advocacy
- Civic intelligence
- Civil liberties
