= Gadjo =

Non-Romani person

In Romani culture, a gorja, gadjo (masculine), or gadji (feminine) is a person who has no Romanipen. This usually corresponds to not being an ethnic Romani, but it can also refer to an ethnic Romani who does not live within Romani society. The term is often used by Romanis to address or denote outsider neighbors living within or very near their community.

== Etymology ==
The exact origin of the word gadjo is not known. One theory considers that it may come from the proto-Romani word for "peasant" and has the same root as the Romani word gav (village).

== In other languages ==
=== Bulgarian ===
The word has been borrowed in Bulgarian as гадже (gadzhe), meaning boyfriend or girlfriend.

=== French ===
The word has been borrowed into French slang as gadjo (masculine) and gadji (feminine), meaning a boy or girl (or less frequently, a man or a woman) or boyfriend and girlfriend.

=== Portuguese ===
The European Portuguese words gajo (masculine) and gaja (feminine) originate in Romani/Caló and are used as everyday slang to refer to a man or a woman (usually referring to old teenagers or young adults), in a usage similar to "guy" and "gal" in English. The word gazim has been attested as a rare use in Brazilian Portuguese, with the meaning of a strange (i.e., foreign) woman, probably with roots in the Romani gadji.

=== Scots ===
The word is encountered as gadgie (or sometimes gadge) in Scots, formerly only used by the Roma/Traveller community, but since the 20th century, it has been in general use by the Scots-speaking population. In most areas it is heard, notably Edinburgh, the Borders, and Dingwall, gadgie has a generalised meaning of a man that the speaker doesn't know well. In Dundee, it is a more pejorative term, referring to a poorly educated person who engages in hooliganism or petty criminality. In the village of Aberchirder, it refers to a local person.

=== Spanish/Caló ===
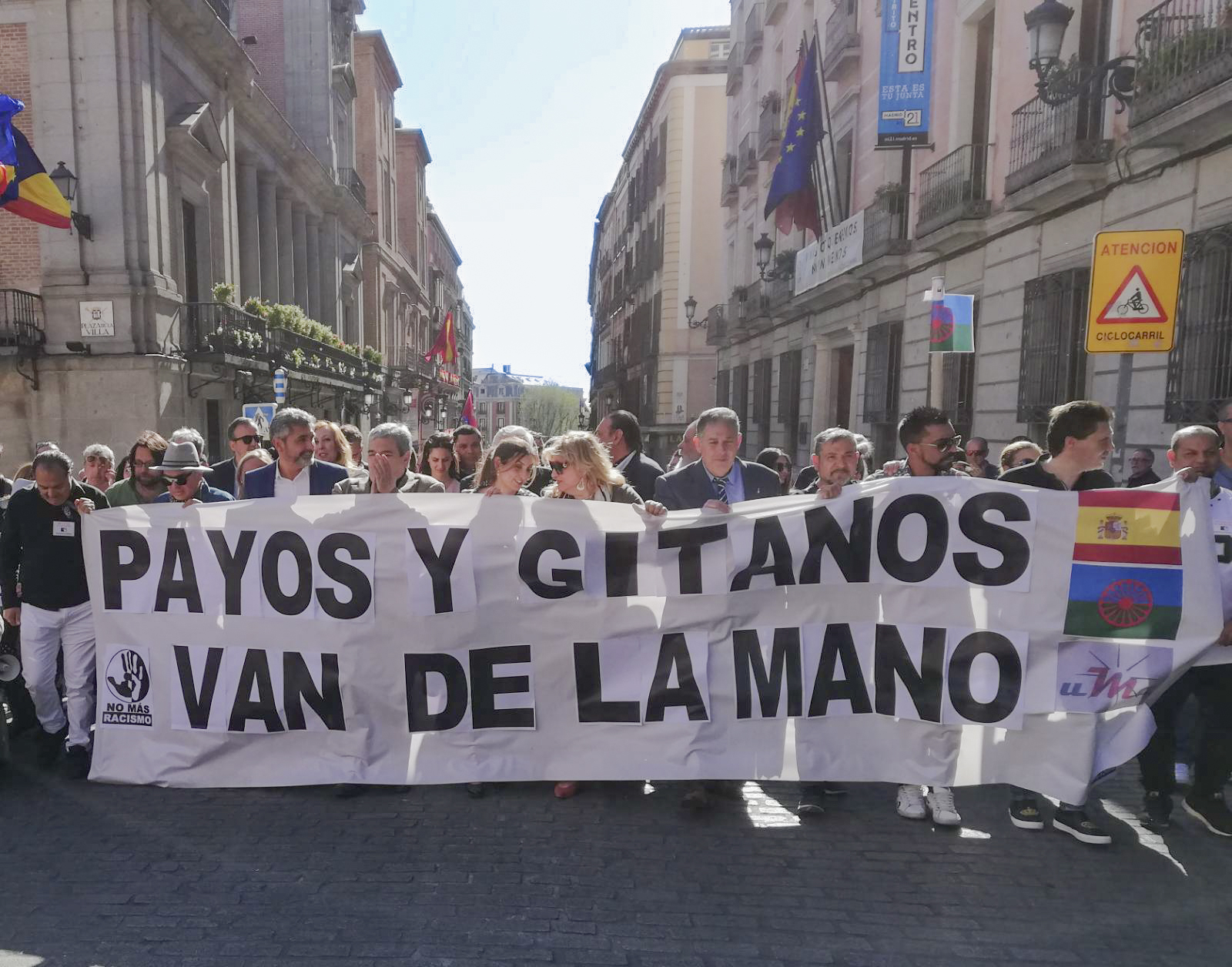
Demonstration against intolerance: "Gadjes and Romas go hand in hand" (Madrid, 6 May 2019)

The word passed from Caló to Spanish slang as gachó (masculine) / gachí (feminine), acquiring the generalized meaning "man, guy" / "woman, girl". The Caló word for a non-Gitano is payo/paya.

== See also ==
- Gadjo dilo, film about a French man's travels to Romania to find a Romani singer
- Gaijin, Japanese term for "foreigner"
- Goy, Hebrew and Yiddish term for "non-Jew"
- Gora, racial epithet for white people in India
- Gringo, Spanish and Portuguese term for "foreigner"
