= List of Romani poets =

The following is a list of ethnic Romani poets, with their language(s) of expression.

- Ion Al-George (1891–1957), Romanian
- Veijo Baltzar (born 1942), Finnish
- Rahim Burhan (born 1949), Vlax Romani and Macedonian
- Philomena Franz (1922–2022), German
- Dimiter Golemanov (1938–1994), Bulgarian, Vlax Romani, and Russian
- Helios Gómez (1905–1956), Spanish
- Bajram Haliti (1955–2022), Kurbet, Serbo-Croatian (Serbian), and English
- Sandra Jayat (c. 1930–2025), French
- Usin Kerim (1929–1983), Bulgarian
- Ali Krasniqi (1952–2024), Kurbet
- Gheorghe A. Lăzăreanu-Lăzurică (1892–?), Romanian
- Seanan McGuire (born 1978), English
- Constantin S. Nicolăescu-Plopșor (1900–1968), Romanian, possibly also Vlax Romani
- Jovan Nikolić (born 1955), Serbo-Croatian (Serbian) and Kurbet
- Olga Pankova (1911–1991), Ruska Romani and Russian
- Baja Saitović-Lukin (1954–2017), Serbo-Croatian (Serbian) and Vlax Romani
- Muharem Serbezovski (born 1950), Balkan Romani and Serbo-Croatian (Bosnian)
- Charlie Smith (1956–2005), English
- Dimitrie Stelaru (1917–1971), Romanian
- Ceija Stojka (1933–2013), German
- Hedina Tahirović-Sijerčić (born 1960), Kurbeti and Serbo-Croatian (Bosnian)
- Bronisława Wajs (1908–1987), Baltic Romani
