= Burhan =

- Pronunciation: [ˈburhaːn]
- Gender: Male

Origin
- Origin: Arabic
- Meaning: Proof
- Region of origin: Arabic

Burhan (Arabic: برهان, Burhān) is a masculine given name and surname of Arabic origin. It is an epithet of the Islamic Prophet Muhammad. It is especially popular in Turkey, as it respects Turkish vowel harmony and the end syllable "-han" can be interpreted as the Turkish variant of "Khan". Notable people with the name include:

== Given name ==
- Burhan Abdurahman (1956–2021), Indonesian politician
- Burhan Akbudak (born 1995), Turkish wrestler
- Burhan Alankuş (born 1950), Turkish alpine skier
- Burhan Ali (1519–1549), self-declared Shah of Shirvan
- Burhan Atak (1905–1987), Turkish footballer
- Burhan Azeem, Pakistani-American politician
- Burhan Belge (1899–1967), Turkish politician
- Burhan Bozkurt (1934–2013), Turkish wrestler
- Burhan Şaik Canbolat (born 1967), Turkish volleyball coach and player
- Burhan Al-Chalabi (born 1947), British-Iraqi writer and political commentator
- Burhan Chandio, Pakistani politician
- Burhan Conkeroğlu (1903–2001), Turkish wrestler
- Burhan Dajani (1921–2000), Palestinian academic and economist
- Burhan Doğançay (1929–2013), Turkish-American painter and photographer
- Burhan Eşer (born 1985), Turkish footballer
- Burhan Ahmed Farooqi (1906–1995), Pakistani philosopher and Islamic theologian
- Burhan Felek (1889–1982), Turkish journalist and writer
- Burhan G (born 1983), Danish-Turkish R&B singer and songwriter
- Burhan Ghalioun (born 1945), French-Syrian academic
- Burhan Karagöz (1929–2019), Turkish businessman
- Burhan Kuzu (1955–2020), Turkish academic and politician
- Burhan Mansurov (1889–1942), Soviet politician and revolutionary
- Burhan Muhammad (1957–2015), Indonesian diplomat
- Burhanul Mukaddim (born 1978), Indian politician
- Burhan Muse (born 1966), Somali royal
- Burhan Ozbilici, Turkish photojournalist
- Burhan Özfatura (1943–2026), Turkish politician
- Burhan Qurbani (born 1980), Afghan-German film director, writer, and actor
- Burhan Sahyouni (born 1986), Syrian footballer
- Burhan Sargun (1929–2023), Turkish footballer
- Burhan Imad Shah (1559–??), ruler of Berar
- Burhan Nizam Shah I (1502–1553), ruler of the Ahmednagar Sultanate
- Burhan Nizam Shah II (died 1595), ruler of Ahmadnagar Sultanate
- Burhan Nizam Shah III (died 1631), ruler of the Ahmadnagar Sultanate
- Burhan Shahidi (1894–1989), Chinese politician
- Burhan Sönmez (born 1965), Turkish novelist
- Burhan Tia (born 1965), Sudanese football manager
- Burhan Uray (1931–2018), Chinese-Indonesian entrepreneur and philanthropist
- Burhan Wani (1994–2016), Indian militant

== Surname ==
- Edanur Burhan (born 1999), Turkish handball player
- Mohamed Burhan (1903–??), Turkish sprinter
- Mohan Niranjit Burhan, Seychellean judge
- Qasem Burhan (born 1985), Qatari footballer
- Rahim Burhan (born 1949), Macedonian theatre director

== See also ==
- Burhan (disambiguation)
- Burhan (Pashtun tribe), Pashtun tribal group
- Arabic name
- Borhani
- Burhan al-Din (disambiguation)
- Burkhan (disambiguation)
