= Karagöz =

Karagöz is a Turkish word meaning "black eye" and may refer to:

- Ayşegül Karagöz (born 2010), Turkish female darts player
- Burhan Karagöz (1929–2019), Turkish businessman
- Nurdan Karagöz (born 1987), Turkish female weightlifter
- Karagöz and Hacivat, lead characters of the traditional Turkish shadow play, popularized during the Ottoman period
- Karagiozis, a shadow puppet and fictional character of Greek folklore
- Karagöz (magazine)
- Karagöz, Bismil
- Karagöz, Çorum
- Karagöz, Dursunbey, a village
- Karagöz, İskilip
- Karagöz, Karaçoban
- Karagöz, Pülümür

== See also ==
- Karagözler
