= Lăzăreanu =

Lăzăreanu is a Romanian surname. Notable people with the surname include:

- Barbu Lăzăreanu (1881–1957), Romanian Jewish scholar and left-wing activist
- Filip Lăzăreanu (born 1981), Romanian footballer
- Gheorghe A. Lăzăreanu-Lăzurică (1892–?), Romanian Romani activist
- Irina Lăzăreanu (born 1982), Romanian-Canadian model and folk singer
- Marcel Lăzăreanu (born 1954), Romanian footballer
