= Burkhanov =

Burkhanov or Burkhanova (Russian: Бурханов/Бурханова; also transliterated Burhonov/Burhonova) is a family name of Uzbek origin meaning "son/daughter of Burhan". It may refer to:

- Shukur Burkhanov (1910–1987), Soviet theatre and film actor
- Mutal Burhonov (1916–2002), Soviet-Uzbek composer
- Sofiya Burkhanova (born 1989), Uzbekistani shot putter
