= Burhan (disambiguation) =

Burhan is an Arabic male name.

Burhan may also refer to:

== Places ==
- Burhan, Pakistan, town located along the Rawalpindi-Peshawar road, in the Punjab province of Pakistan
- Burhan Interchange, interchange located in the west of Hasan Abdal city in Attock District, Pakistan
- Aq Burhan, a village in Aleppo Governorate, Syria

== Books ==
- Al-Burhan, an 11th-century exegesis on the Quran
- Burhan al-Haqq, a 1963 theological work by Nur Ali Elahi

== Other uses ==
- Burhan (Pashtun tribe)

== See also ==
- Burhan G (album), a 2010 album by Burhan G
- Burhaniye (disambiguation)
- Burhaniyya
