= Karagözler =

Karagözler may refer to the following places in Turkey:

- Karagözler, Fethiye
- Karagözler, Güney
- Karagözler, İncirliova

== See also ==
- Karagöz
