= Burhaniye (disambiguation) =

Burhaniye is a town and district of Balıkesir Province in the Aegean region of Turkey.

Burhaniye may also refer to:

- Burhaniye (Metrobus), a station on the Istanbul Metrobus Bus rapid transit line
- Burhaniye, Kestel, a village in the Kestel district of Bursa Province, Turkey
- Burhaniye, Üsküdar, a neighborhood in Üsküdar district of Istanbul, Turkey
- Burhaniye, Vezirköprü, a village in Vezirköprü district of Samsun Province, Turkey

== See also ==
- Burhan (disambiguation)
- Burhaniyya
