= Gheorghe A. Lăzăreanu-Lăzurică =

Romanian Romani activist, writer and businessman (1892-?)

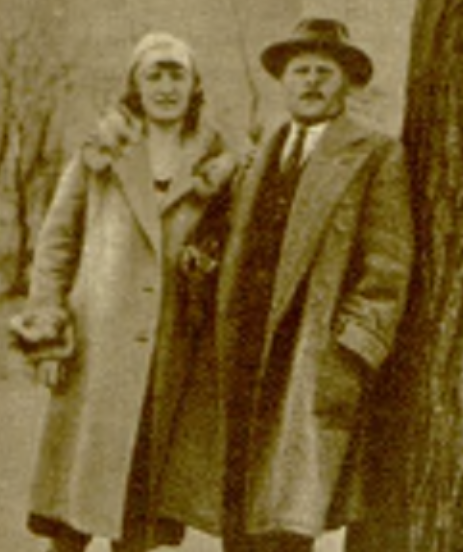
- Marta and Gheorghe Lăzurică in Kaunas, 1936

Leader of the General Union of Roma in Romania
- In office September 1933 – May 1934
- Preceded by: none (position established)
- Succeeded by: Gheorghe Nicolescu

Personal details
- Born: Gheorghe Lăzărescu; 1892
- Died: date unknown
- Other political affiliations: National Christian Party
- Profession: Businessman, journalist, novelist, poet, civil servant

Gheorghe A. Lăzăreanu-Lăzurică or George Lăzurică, also known as Lăzărescu-Lăzurică or Lăzărică (1892 – ?), was a leader of the Romani (Gypsy) community in Romania, also remembered for his support of Romania's interwar far-right. Originally a musician and formally trained entrepreneur from an assimilated background, he became conscious about his ethnic roots while serving with the Romanian Land Forces in World War I. A pioneer of Romani-themed literature, he became active within the General Association of Gypsies in Romania in 1933, but broke away that same year to establish the (eventually more powerful) General Union of Roma in Romania. From September 1933 to May 1934, Lăzurică was also a "Voivode of the Gypsies", recognized as such by various local tribes. He and his followers came to resent ethnic designation as "Gypsies", and pleaded for the usage of "Romanies", first proposed to them by Nicolae Constantin Batzaria. Lăzurică himself tried to introduce the term Zgripți as a reference to the people's legendary ancestors.

Though credited with inventing Romani political symbolism and noted for invoking a worldwide tribal identity, Lăzurică and his followers abstained from Romani nationalist activism, preferring to focus on social reform, and accepted some measure of integration with mainstream Romanian society. The General Union cooperated with the Romanian Orthodox Church, spreading Christianity among nomads whom it helped to settle, and competing for baptisms with the Romanian Greek Catholics. From 1933, Lăzurică blended his Romani identity with Romanian nationalism, and finally with fascism: he campaigned for the National Agrarian Party and maintained contacts with the Iron Guard, while allegedly imitating Adolf Hitler in his public persona. He was sidelined by the General Union in 1934, after a violent conflict during which he was forced to deny his belonging to the Romani ethnicity.

Lăzurică soon recanted and involved himself in other projects, with reports suggesting that he was planning a research trip to the British Raj, or that he declared himself "President" of the Romanian Romanies. He still attempted to rally support for his politics, and in 1937 became leader of the Citizens' Association of Roma in Romania. This new group was more explicitly far-right, antisemitic, and assimilationist, viewing the Romanians and Romanies as people of a "shared destiny", equally threatened by foreigners; there followed an extended polemic with other Romanies, and with Romanian left-wingers, which included Lăzurică was the victim of a death hoax. By 1938, the Association was openly supporting the fascist National Christian Party, of which Lăzurică himself became a member. In the final known stages of his career, Lăzurică became a critic of Orthodoxy, reporting on its previous slave-owning practices and drawing suspicion that he had converted to Catholicism. Upon the start of World War II, he suggested colonizing Romanies on Romania's borders.

== Activities ==
=== Rise to fame ===
Reportedly born as Gheorghe Lăzărescu in 1892, the future activist belonged to the musicians' tribe of the Romani community, or Lăutari; one report of 1934 suggests that he was still an outstanding performer. While sometimes introduced as "Mr. Lăzurică the lawyer", he had in fact graduated from the Higher Commercial School of Bucharest, and, by 1933, was running his own forestry warehouse in that same city. As reported by Romanian writer Cezar Petrescu, he was originally dismissive of his ethnicity, being the "son of people who had forgotten their origin." He was drafted into the campaign of World War I, and saw action at Topraisar in Northern Dobruja. Wounded and left for dead in the trenches, "he was lifted and dragged out of there by the Țambalagiu Gypsy Ioniță Gheorghe, and it was then and there, under machine-gun fire, that he swore he would dedicate his life for the salvation of his breed." In a 1934 speech calling on "public figures of Gypsy origin to stick to their race", he advanced the claim that there were "more than two hundred thousand" Romani civil servants, listing "a large number of high-ranking officials, military officers and other well-known intellectuals, who, having held good positions, are now called Romanians".

Lăzurică's main activity was as a journalist, published by both Universul and Adevărul, though he also contributed verse—in 1936, Az Est newspaper called him "an excellent Gypsy poet". Described by a Dreptatea columnist as a "remarkably talented raconteur", he wrote and published a number of "Roma historical novels". Lăzurică still used Romanian, but now expressed his pride at having Romani heritage, and some time after 1930 changed his name to the hyphenated form, with Lăzurică sounding more like his Romani vernacular (as reported by sociologist Ion Duminică, this was originally a nickname used by his Romani grandfather). Gheorghe also married a Czechoslovak Romani, Marta. Little is known about her background, other than her ethnic origin, her claim to fluency in 5 languages, and her qualification as a stenographer.

Lăzurică's life and career coincided with the earliest attempts to create a Romani political caucus. Some of the first steps in this direction occurred in 1919 Transylvania, which was in the process of uniting with Romania. "Gypsy gatherings", which demanded increased rights and sedentarization of the Romanies within Greater Romania, were nevertheless forgotten by the public, as even some of the active participants refrained from discussing them later in the interwar. A first documented effort of organizing the Romanies into a political body occurred in 1926, when Lazăr Naftanailă (or Naftanoilă), "a wealthy peasant of Gypsy origin", established a Neo-Rustic Brotherhood, centered on Calbor. Naftanailă was among the first activists to advocate the creation of another ethnonym to replace țigani ("Gypsies", from Athinganoi), and tried to impose "Neo-Rustics", or "new peasants", as a non-discriminatory alternative.

The following year, a Lăutari syndicate, Junimea Muzicală, applied for registration in Ilfov County. This became the nucleus for the much larger General Association of Gypsies in Romania (AGȚR), unofficially formed by Calinic Șerboianu, a priest of the Romanian Orthodox Church, in April 1933. Lăzurică appears mentioned as the AGȚR general secretary, and "solely responsible" for is actions, in a news column of May 21. This piece also calls on "all friends of the association" to rally for the Universul protest against Hungarian irredentism, "so as to prove that Gypsies are good Romanians, [and are] devoted to their motherland." Also then, Adevărul Literar și Artistic featured Lăzurică's review of Șerboianu's "interesting book", Les Tziganes. At the time, he took no issue with Șerboianu being a non-Romani (or gadjo), commending his ability to converse in the "High Gypsy language". Lăzurică estimated the total of Romanies in Romania at 800,000, and chided the author for estimating it at less than half that number; however, he himself noted that "our Gypsy minority assimilated so much into the native population that it is about to lose its language and customs."

Lăzurică's induction by the AGȚR was part of Șerboianu's attempt to cultivate a genuinely "Gypsy" activism. According to historian Petre Matei, "Șerboianu declared that although he was not a Gypsy, he pretended to be one because he wanted thus to win the trust of the people he hoped to organize. At the first meeting with G. A. Lăzurică, [he] did not pretend to be more than a sympathiser of the Gypsies." Lăzurică and Gheorghe Nicolescu (or Niculescu) are both recorded as AGȚR militants, and soon after as factional leaders; the schism between them and Șerboianu is most precisely dated to September of the same year. As reported by ethnologist Gabriela Boangiu, this was the peak of a feud between Șerboianu and one of the AGȚR's "main leaders", Lăzurică. Șerboianu continued to preside over one of these organizations, which still used the AGȚR title. Most of its membership was absorbed by Lăzurică's more competitive General Union of Roma in Romania (UGRR). This was run from Lăzurică's single-room apartment on Sârbească Street, Bucharest, and included his wife Marta as Vice President of the Female Section.

=== First congresses ===
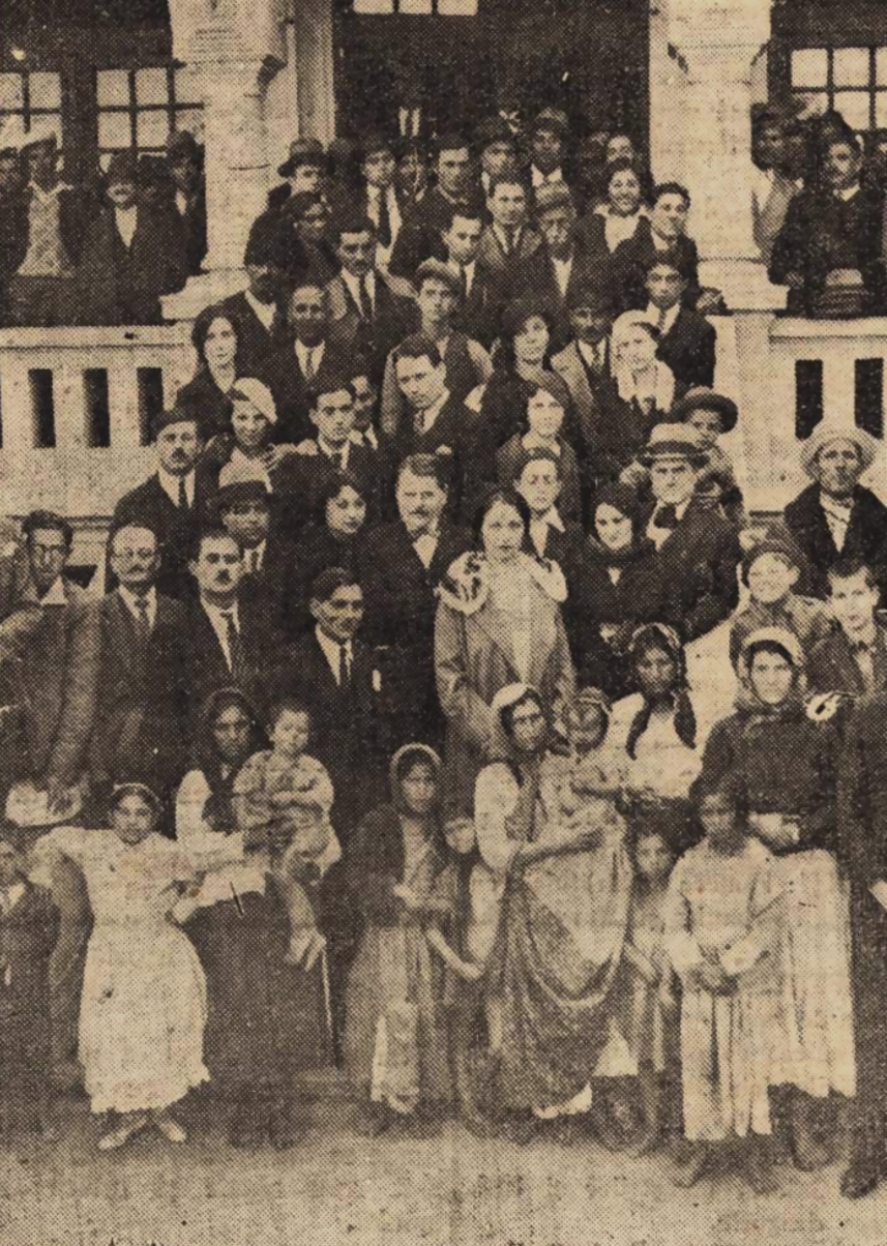
Lăzăreanu-Lăzurică surrounded by other participants in the Ileana Hall meeting of October 8, 1933

As seen by Boangiu, Lăzurică was "as quaint a figure as he was important for the associationist phenomenon of the Rroma [sic] ethnicity." Also known as the General Union of the Romanian Gypsies, Lăzurică's group held congress on October 8 at Ileana Hall, in the Bucharest neighborhood of Moșilor. This encounter among the various groups (including the community in Brăila, represented by Petre Bașno) aired grievances about shared concerns. The list included unemployment, for which Lăzurică placed blame on "modernism" and its indifference to Romani arts and crafts, but also the endemic nature of tuberculosis and sexually transmitted infections in tribal communities. Lăzurică was thankful that Romanian Police allowed his congress to take place, praising Prefect Gavrilă Marinescu for his tolerance.

Also then, Lăzurică produced allegations that Șerboianu had been defrocked; the congress included a sermon by another priest, Dionisie Lungu. This political debut and related scandals were covered by the Veselia, the humor magazine: "Many very decent have emerged, intellectuals, as in doctors, engineers professors and students, who have come out regarding their origin, only motivated by the opportunity of bettering their kin. And then, just like that, the 'chiefs' begin their work of uniting Gypsies by first excluding each other. Quite a Gypsy thing to do!" One of those who attended the congress was Ilie Rădulescu, a member of the National Agrarian Party (PNA), a right-wing Romanian nationalist group chaired by poet Octavian Goga. Rădulescu allegedly came out as a Romani origin, but asked Lăzurică not to publicize that fact; the latter, however, boasted it to the press, informing it that there was no shame in being Romani, since it also validated one's belonging to the "Aryan race".

In November, Lăzurică applied for the UGRR to be recognized as a juridical person under Romanian law, but this process stagnated upon revelations that six of its founding members were either registered with fictitious addresses or had criminal records. Researcher Ilona Klímová-Alexander writes that Lăzurică managed to "hijack" Șerboianu's plans, "traveling all over the country, establishing local branches and emphasizing their relationship to the centre; he also visited universities and persuaded Romani students to attend." Claiming to be the first-ever assembly of the Romanies in Romania, this caucus proclaimed Lăzurică its "Voivode"; Șerboianu was marginalized, and his supporters, mostly based in Transylvania, were barred from attending the UGRR meeting. Veselia reports that Naftanailă, "a modest Gypsy, just now wrestled out of his anonymity," was a delegate to the UGRR congress—but also that he photographed himself with Șerboianu, wearing the Romanian tricolor for a sash.

In July 1934, the UGRR entered Șerboianu's fief in Târnava-Mică County, opening its own chapter with a festivity on Liberty field. In October, the Union organized an international congress of the Gypsies. Held out in the open in one of Bucharest's Romani suburbs, it reportedly used the slogan "Gypsies of the World unite", calling on all nomads to "organize themselves into a race-conscious and stable community." Its organizers promised that the Romani community had entered the age of "national dignity". Lăzurică was then tasked with representing the General Union at any future international meeting. Both he and Șerboianu were members of the Gypsy Lore Society, which, by 1935, was recognizing him as the only known Romani writer.

Historian Viorel Achim highlights Lăzurică's debts to "romantic literature", reflected in his use of "Voivode". This title had never been claimed by any Romani tribal leader in Romania, where preference had been given to lesser ones, including Bulibașa and Vătaf. The same is argued by researchers Daniel Dieaconu and Silviu Costachie, who see Lăzurică as having embraced a "romantic myth" of purely Western European extraction. Variants of the title had appeared for various Gypsy tribal leaders in the high-medieval Kingdom of Hungary, which covered Transylvania and other regions inhabited by Romanians and Romanies. Tax-collecting and judicial Voivodes had also resurfaced in Hungarian successor states: a waywoda cziganorum was created in the Eastern Hungarian Kingdom in 1541, and then preserved as such by the Principality of Transylvania. It went to gadjo Ferenc Baladffy in 1557, and was usurped by Matei Bihari in 1600. The Banate of Lugos also preserved the office, with holders such as Lazar of Karansebes (1572) and Nicolae Fecza (1645).

The custom was only briefly emulated by the Habsburg monarchy in places like Szörény County (1699)—though such offices were purged during the era of enlightened absolutism, in the 18th century. Shortly before 1800, in Habsburg Transylvania, Ion Budai-Deleanu introduced Gypsy voivodes and aristocrats, including the aspiring Tandaler, in his mock-epic Țiganiada. One real voivodeship was revived for "gold-washing Gypsies" in some parts of the principality, but only to 1832. By 1900, the existence of a "Gypsy Voivode" was attested as a performative function in Romanian folklore around Cluj: a Romanian using that alias was a keeper of the village secrets, as well as a ritualistic castigator of its sins. In April 1925, Clujul Românesc newspaper reported that: "The new voivode of Gypsies in America is Frank Mitchell, whose ancestor was a Romanian Gypsy."

Scholar Mihaela Mudure notes that voivodal references in the 1930s were meant to evoke a "romanticized version of Gypsy leadership" and command "feudal" loyalty from UGRR members; "democratic practices", she argues, "were very limited." While the 28-member executive committee worked pro-bono, Lăzurică, as the UGRR acting president, received unconditional refunding for all his expenses. Lăzurică surrounded himself with distinguished members of the community: violinist Grigoraș Dinicu assisted him as honorary chairman, though he had initially resisted his own appointment; historian George Potra and musician D. Panaitescu were members of the UGRR committee. Lăzurică extended an offer to the incumbent Bulibașa, who was living "somewhere in Bessarabia", and could not be found in time for the selection. The Voivode also increased grassroots representation, being the first Romani leader to encourage the participation of women, who formed their own corps within the UGRR. Lăzurică now claimed to be leader over 1 million Romanies, which was probably double the number of Romanies existing in Greater Romania.

The Voivode's legitimacy was still challenged by the other Romani groups resulting from the AGȚR schism—although, according to Mudure: "the agenda of these organizations was pretty much the same. They were interested in creating educational opportunities for the Gypsies, welfare benefits, settling down the nomadic Gypsies, and improving the image of the Gypsies in the media." The two bodies had virtually identical charters, though with some major differences of political vocabulary. In Oltenia, a third group, headed by Aurel Manolescu-Dolj, collaborated with both national organizations in pursuing immediate objectives. Manolescu-Dolj, who also styled himself "Voivode", rallied with the UGRR; his associate, Constantin S. Nicolăescu-Plopșor, published a corpus of Romani mythology for the Union's newspaper, O Ròm.

=== Integration and nationalism ===
Bicolor version of the Romani flag, reportedly used by the UGRR

One of the key goals of the UGRR was in convincing members and outsiders to use romi ("Romanies") over țigani, which it viewed as derogatory. News reports of the 1933 congress and its aftermath used the term, but often in quotation marks, indicating that it "was not fully accepted by the Romanian public opinion." Lăzurică himself extended the neologism to mean "freedom-loving man", rather than simply "man", and claimed that it had etymological links to Ramayana. As argued by Matei, he had had no objection to using țigani as an endonym during his association with Șerboianu, and had left several written statements describing himself as a "Gypsy". Matei notes that the newer term was most likely suggested to him by Nicolae Constantin Batzaria, the Romanian head editor at Adevărul. In his column of September 5, 1933, Batzaria had chided Șerboianu for using an implicitly demeaning and hostile term, arguing for romi as both authentic and preferable. Lăzurică's first documented use of romi is dated by Matei to October 1933, in a manifesto which repeats Batzaria's attack on Șerboianu. His newfound appreciation for the term was challenged by the more senior activist Naftanailă, who, by 1934, had reconciled with the word țigani and was using it in the title of his rival newspaper, Neamul Țigănesc. Naftanailă was nevertheless also mentioned as leader of the UGRR branch in Transylvania.

Dreptatea, as an organ of the left-leaning National Peasants' Party, gave a positive review to Lăzurică and Șerboianu's identity politics: "The Gypsies' 'ethnic pride' is a commendable psychological therapy, serving to seal and heal wounds produced by an unjust past, one of persecution and poverty." Generally, Lăzurică and his followers were primarily interested in cultural, spiritual, and especially social goals, which took precedence over shows of Romani nationalism; historians describe the view the UGRR as mixing social integrationism and cultural separatism. He took distance from Romani internationalism, asking Romanian authorities to ban "foreign" Romani orchestras from performing in the country, hoping to have the trade monopolized by Lăutari. The UGRR banner displayed the symbols of Romani trades, which Lăzurică wanted protected and promoted, alongside the coat of arms of Romania; at least 36 other banners existed, each representing an UGRR affiliate group. Proposals were accepted which were to create a national flag of the Romanies. Historian Ian Hancock claims that it was a horizontal bicolor, and as such a predecessor for the current Romani flag. However, this interpretation remains disputed.

The UGRR's newspaper, Glasul Romilor, declared that the community would defend the Romanian state and its Kings "until death. Within our brother Roma[ni] we have never found of traitor to the State." Subsequent articles "focused on the same three overarching themes of God, King and Country". In its program, the Union pledged to support the Romanian Orthodox Church against proselytizing "sects", and promised to oversee Romani processions on Dormition Feast (August 15, chosen by the UGRR as a "National Day"). This goal was tempered by other public statements, with Lăzurică reassuring his followers that they would have freedom of worship. As noted by Klímová-Alexander, the Voivode was spuriously accused by other Romanies of wanting to make his community an appendage of official Orthodoxy; in fact, he "could have used the support and resources of the Church to further [his] own mobilization goals."

On February 6, 1934, Lăzurică was granted a missionary card, which he used as his ID, notably during trips to Hunedoara County in October 1934. He managed to settle some nomads on land purchased by the UGRR, persuading them to undergo baptism and church marriage, also setting up a workers' co-operative and Romani-staffed schools. Despite its close association with Orthodoxy, the UGRR was also routinely accused by Șerboianu of being a proxy for the Romanian Greek Catholic Church. Himself suspected of being a pro-Catholic who would endorse the "Romanies' Catholicization", Șerboianu had lost Orthodox support, which allowed the UGRR manifestos to be printed in the Church's official press. The Church also provided Lăzurică with funding for his 1933 Congress.

Already in 1933, comments in the Western press described Lăzurică as a quasi-fascist, and an "exceptionally good impersonator" of Adolf Hitler. Writing in December of that year, Calendarul journalist N. Crevedia argued that Lăzurică secretly wished for "a good dictatorship, in this country of pure Gypsy morals". While the program also promised that Romanies would remain "aloof from all extremist parties" and "politically non-aligned", in practice the UGRR was intimately associated with the far-right fringes of Romanian nationalism, including fascists. The group's first congress was reportedly attended by 20 members of the Iron Guard. Romanian Police reported on a correspondence between the Voivode and the Guard's "Captain", Corneliu Zelea Codreanu, while also noting that Lăzurică had secured support from Prefect Marinescu.

Matei proposes that anti-Romanyism had no significance to the interwar's far-right in Romania, since "Romanian nationalists defined themselves through antisemitism". As he notes, Romanian right-wing radicals of the day could be simultaneously antisemitic and pro-Romani. Codreanu personally promised to support the General Union, and helped with isolating Șerboianu. The UGRR then gave honorary membership to Codreanu and other figures on the far-right, including Nae Ionescu and Pamfil Șeicaru. However, similar honors were bestowed on apolitical figures, including writers Adrian Maniu and Mihai Tican Rumano.

The UGRR and its rivals were equally involved in canvassing votes for Romanian parties. Months before the general elections of 1933, Lăzurică was an agent for Goga's PNA, instructing the Romanies to cast their vote for its candidates. The AGȚR noticed such developments, publicizing claims that Lăzurică was Goga's tool. In turn, Lăzurică depicted Șerboianu as an apostate of Orthodoxy, deflecting the charge of Greek Catholic proselytism toward the AGȚR itself. However, by the time of the actual vote, he himself had switched sides, opting for the more mainstream National Liberal Party and asking that all Romanies do the same. Lăzurică was appointed to lead an UGRR delegation expressing support for Prime Minister Ion G. Duca, while also pressing him to respond favorably to the Romanies' demands. At the same time, Manolescu-Dolj and his followers took a different path, and canvassed for the Georgist Liberals. As read by Mudure, these strategies meant "offering to certain Romanian mainstream politicians the support of the Gypsy vote in exchange for affirmative action policies for the Gypsies."

=== Ouster and return ===
On March 18–25, 1934, Lăzurică organized at Omnia Cinema, Bucharest, the Festival of Art and Culture of the Roma in Europe, where he himself lectured on the "Origin, History and Emigration of Roma in Europe". His final work within the General Union was a massive effort to bring Transylvania's Romanies into the Orthodox church, which included reversing their Magyarization. This culminated with a mass baptism at Blaj on May 28, 1934. Immediately after, on May 29 or May 31, Lăzurică was toppled from the UGRR chairmanship and then expelled altogether. His downfall was precipitated by the spread of rumors, nominating him as a "fraud" and "Jew", and claiming that the "ex-Voivode" had defrauded a veterinary doctor. Lăzurică had also recruited the brothers Gheorghe and Nicolae Nicolescu as the UGRR sponsors, but then saw them turning against him. The Nicolescus engineered Lăzurică's downfall, reportedly brutalizing him until he signed a document in which he falsely denied that he was a Romani. Denying him his ethnicity was a ruse not anticipated by their rival, who had otherwise made the position of chairman intangible.

Lăzurică's replacement as UGRR leader, and also as Voivode, was Gheorghe Nicolescu, who served until 1941. Despite this change, the group continued to display fascist sympathies: according to one report, the 1935 Romani congress in Bucharest, presided upon by Gheorghe Nicolescu, was held in a hall decked with portraits of Hitler. According to a notice in Unirea Poporului newspaper, Lăzurică was supposedly invited to attend this meeting, which would have also offset any dispute between the two main factions by allowing attendees to elect their leadership. Nicolescu managed to obtain official recognition from the Romanian government, which Lăzurică had been unable to secure, and by 1939 commanded the loyalties of some 400,000 to 800,000 Romanies, grouped into 40 regional branches.

According to Petrescu, Lăzurică was suffering indignities because he had refused to align his movement with any mainstream party, and in general for having "dared to advance his people into the human race." His marginalization greatly reduced his income: he was "starving to death" in a "small flat of the mahala". Despite his setbacks, Lăzurică remained active in the community. In late June 1934, still presenting himself as the UGRR leader, he announced that he was commissioning a bust of Grigore Alexandru Ghica (a key figure in the 1850s abolition of Roma slavery), "to be placed in the center of a village comprising the greatest number of Romanies." A report of August suggested that the Blaj Romanies, "verified and instructed by Lăzurică", were demanding racial quotas "in town and church affairs", and would not attend church until being granted such concessions. Also that month, Lăzurică and Șerboianu agreed to merge their respective organizations, forming a new UGRR of which they were, respectively, the "organizing chairman" and "active chairman". They were assisted by an executive bureau, whose members included Ispas Borbely, Nicolae Gheorghe Lache, Apostol Matei, Vasile Mureșeanu, and Niculae I. Sarru. Some weeks later, Lăzurică tried to obtain Niculescu's indictment on battery charges, while Niculescu himself reported him for fraud; both accusations were being assessed by the same prosecutor, Benedict Stoenescu.

On September 10, 1934, the Voivode presided upon his own Romani congress at Sibiu; in a series of "10 commandments", delegates were asked to submit to both him and the Orthodox Church, to love Romania and its king, and to not steal or have sex outside marriage. Commenting on this document, journalist V. Munteanu suggested that Lăzurică had embraced dictatorial means without having the needed charisma, and that his channeling of Orthodoxy would naturally alienate Romanies of other religious backgrounds. The congress of Sibiu was soon followed by rallies at Diciosânmartin (October 1934) and Ploiești (April 1935). As noted by Ellenzék newspaper, he had grouped a new circle of loyalists, including architect Andrei (András) Zima of Blaj, "who outlined the self-sacrificing work of Grand Voivode G. A. Lăzurică in unifying all Gypsies"; other disciples were Adam Bunaciu of Târnava-Mică and Gheorghe Sicra of Târnava-Mare. Ellenzék reported that Lăzurică's new organization was meeting some opposition from Magyarized Romanies, who were annoyed that all speeches given at Diciosânmartin were in Romanian. In that context, Lăzurică was praised by Petrescu for his re-Romanianization of "20,000 Transylvanian Gypsies". The left-wing newspaper Lupta noted this as a paradoxical claim, since it suggested that Romanian nationalists were blind to racial differences only when it came to the Romanies.

Lăzurică was by then pursuing his own ideas on Romani ancestry. As noted by Matei, he produced a "national Romani mythology" with echoes from "Indianism", centered on a pseudohistorical ethnicity and ancestor of the Romani tribes—called Zgripți. In August 1934, he was approached by English and American Romani associations, who asked him to join an anthropological expedition to study the people's origins on the Indian subcontinent. He reportedly accepted, claiming that such investigations would provide Romanies with a "Palestine of their own". Historian Raluca Bianca Roman concludes that both Zgripți and the expedition story were "a mystification which appeared in 1934 in the international press", possibly invented by Lăzurică himself. A year later, he declared his intention to merge the world's Romanies into a single nation, announcing that he would set up his newspaper to promote his goal. He also stated his new conviction, namely that the Romani "tribe" was of ancient Egyptian origin. Az Est quotes him as saying: "I demand rights and a homeland for the Gypsies [...] on the territory of Romania. Almost one million Gypsies live here, which is why Romania is the most suitable for creating a Gypsy homeland. In the new Gypsy homeland, the Gypsy language would be the official language." L'Intransigeant reporter René Benazec claimed that, in 1935, Lăzurică was already styling himself "President of the Romanies' Republic", but that this title too had been usurped by a third Romani leader, who also stole and used Lăzurică's business card.

=== PNC alliance ===
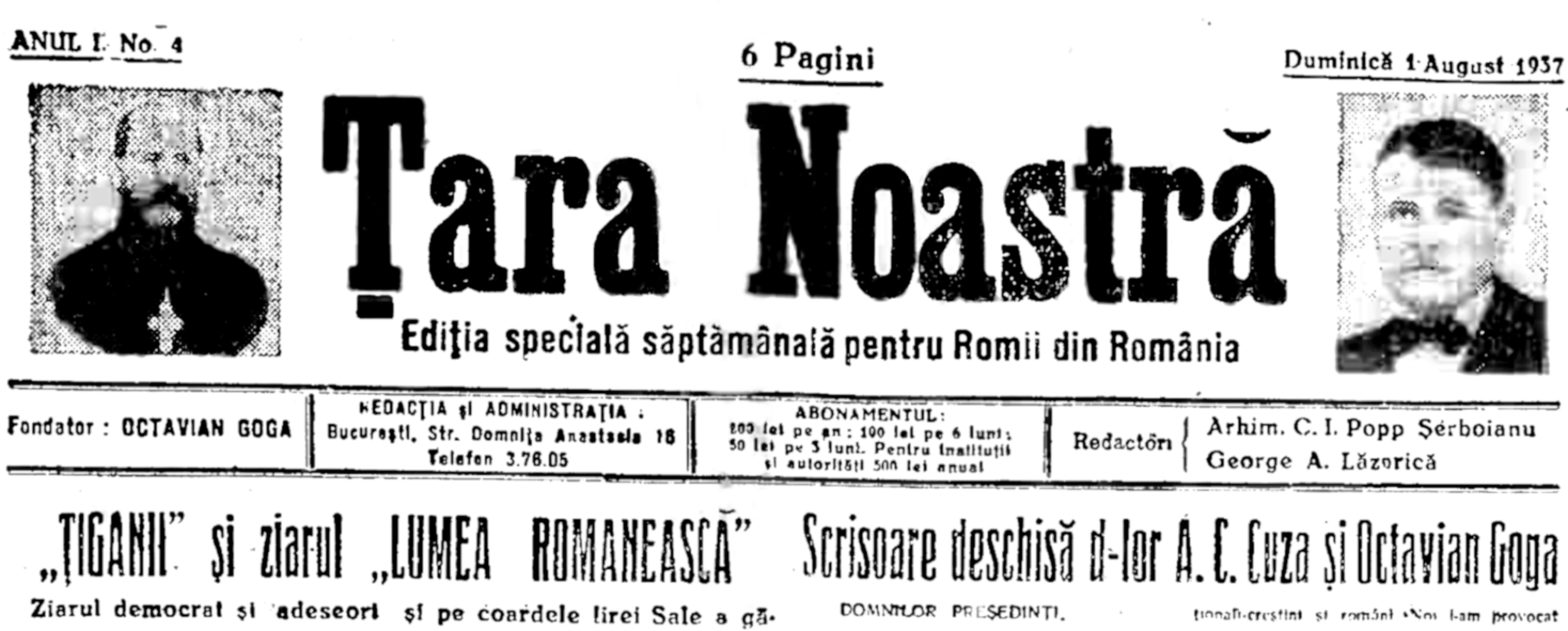
Calinic Șerboianu (left) and Lăzăreanu-Lăzurică on the nameplate of Țara Noastră's weekly Romani issue (edition of August 1, 1937)

Also in 1935, Viața Basarabiei reported that Lăzurică's "charming sketches" had been translated into Czech, and that he was still a worthy promoter of Romani literature. Lăzurică had by then formed a "Civic Organization of Roma in Romania", of which he was also the president; he then rejoined the AGȚR, now styled "General Association of the Roma", with Marta serving on its Central Committee. On September 3, 1935, when the Association organized a rally of Romani workers from Floreasca, Rahova and Tei, Lăzurică and Șerboianu were presented as co-chairmen; Zima was proclaimed leader of the Transylvanian regional wing. On that occasion, they issued demands that all public works be completed by teams comprising at least 70% Romanian-and-Romani workers. As reported by Curentul daily in October 1936, both his and the Nicolescus' electioneering was unconvincing for the mass of Romanies in Floreasca, who were living in squalid conditions. It cited Floreasca's Staroste as saying: "They fight each other tooth and nail for the ownership of Gypsy souls [...]. You should be here for when they come into the hood at election time, that dogs have something to bark at!... I wouldn't be at all surprised if one of these days to find that Lăzurică has been elected a deputy—for he sure can talk, just as he sure can't work!"

Lăzurică and his wife attended the 1936 Romani Congress of Kaunas as Romanian delegates, and proposed founding an international Romani newspaper. Gheorghe still supported Orthodox missionary work, and was again involved with the far-right, caucusing with Goga's National Christian Party (PNC) and contributing to its newspaper, Țara Noastră. The PNC doctrines implied that Romanies were a traditional and assimilable minority, which, unlike the Romanian Jews, posed no threat to the "Romanian bourgeoisie", and were even "useful to the Romanian nation"; he further contended that "of all foreigners, only the Romani nation [...] has sacrificed itself for [Romania] and never once betrayed her, unlike many in the Judaic nation." In return for such recognition, Lăzurică postulated that the PNC was deserving of the Association's electoral strength, and promised to "build a wall of granite" for the protection of his Romanian allies. In a February 1937 article for Manolescu-Dolj's newspaper Timpul, he stated a revised account on the Zgripți origin, depicting them as Bactrians who had rejected Brahmin customs to continue their nomadic lifestyles, and who were famed throughout Asia for their military prowess and courage. They had only been driven out of their homeland by Mongol invasions, splitting into three groups, only one of which was Egyptian.

From August 5, 1936, Lăzurică was an honorary chairman of Apostol Matei's new group, called "Redemption of the Romani Men and Women in Romania"; he was colleagues there with Miron Cristea, the Patriarch of All Romania. The "Redemption" expanded on the UGRR goals, promising protectionism for Romani traders, in preference to "foreign" ones, as well as envisaging full equality of treatment between Romanies and Romanians. Lăzurică was also in a position to destabilize Nicolescu's relationship with the Church, obtaining that UGRR men be stripped of their positions as Christian missionaries. Nevertheless, Nicolescu was able to win over the Church, slowly pushing it away from its endorsement of Lăzurică.

Lăzurică highlighted his "national and Christian" political turn in September 1936, when he decided to sue Mihail Sadoveanu and Mihail Sevastos, editors of the left-wing Adevărul, for having published his Poveste țigănească ("Gypsy Story") without his consent. As he noted at the time, the affair had left him in financial trouble: the more right-wing Universul "no longer accepts my collaboration", with public opinion viewing him as a "renegade". In July 1937, Lăzurică published in the Romani edition of Țara Noastră his attack on Romanian Jews, whom he called "kikes" and viewed as "alien to the problems and national interests of the Romanian nation, playing the communist tune"; Romanies, on the other hand, were loyal. He elaborated on his claim that all Jews "practice communism": "Depending on how the winds blow, sometimes they pretend to be assimilated, and sometimes national, Jews, [but] they all want to bring together a popular front, so they come under the protection of the International Jewish Alliance and threaten Romania with the intervention of foreign forums."

At the time, Lăzurică and his followers condemned other Romanies, who had embraced left-wing nationalism. He was familiar with Nevo Drom, a magazine for communist Romanies in the Soviet Union. He declared that the Soviet realm was entirely "in kike hands", which meant that all other Soviet nationalities were being oppressed; he was dismissive of Nevo Drom's claim that a Soviet "Romani republic" was being created. Another Romani contributor to Țara Noastră, C. Mirmillo, proclaimed: "Any Roma who does not stand by [the PNC] is an enemy of the country and the Romanian nation. He is a black Jew, and as such suffers the fate of the eternally wandering Jew." The contention was received with derision in Lupta, whose columnist noted that musician Fănică Luca supported the French Popular Front, despite being "a more qualified 'Roma' than [...] Lăzurică".

Also then, Lăzurică announced the creation of a Citizens' Association of Roma in Romania (ACRR), which he insisted was not a separate ethnic party. It immediately formed a cartel with the PNC for the local elections of that summer, being promised that every commune would have at least one Romani councilor. This alliance was ridiculed by the PNC's rivals from the National Peasants' Party, but Țara Noastră defended it as a natural outcome: the Romanies and the Romanians "shaped each other through a shared destiny". Writing for Adevărul in August 1937, Tudor Teodorescu-Braniște noted that Lăzurică was a self-declared "enemy of democracy", and argued that this was a paradox—since Romanies owed their emancipation to democrats. According to Teodorescu-Braniște, the move to incorporate the ACRR into the PNC was a sign that the latter was "abandon[ing] racist principles", adding: "We have received numerous letters asking us if this [alliance] was real, if it was not a fabrication of ours."

Meanwhile, Hungarian journalist Endre Kakassy observed that the PNC's "armor of principles" had a hole in it, "namely one that the Gypsies could now fit through." Kakassy suspected pure opportunism on Lăzurică's part: "Roma leaders go beyond declaring Goga a saint. They have barely pitched their tents in the shadow of the [PNC] swastika, and they are already scolding the Jew. Here's the real truth: the Gypsy is a great psychologist, he knows with what note he should strike to open up hearts and pockets." That same month, La Tribune Juive reported that "a new acquisition was made" by the PNC, arguing that the "extraordinary numerous Romanian Gypsies" would be directly useful in applying anti-Jewish terror. As noted by the paper, Romani protectionism was now explicitly directed against Jewish musicians, and, "for the first time in history, an anti-Jewish journal has appeared in the Gypsy language."

=== Death hoax and aftermath ===
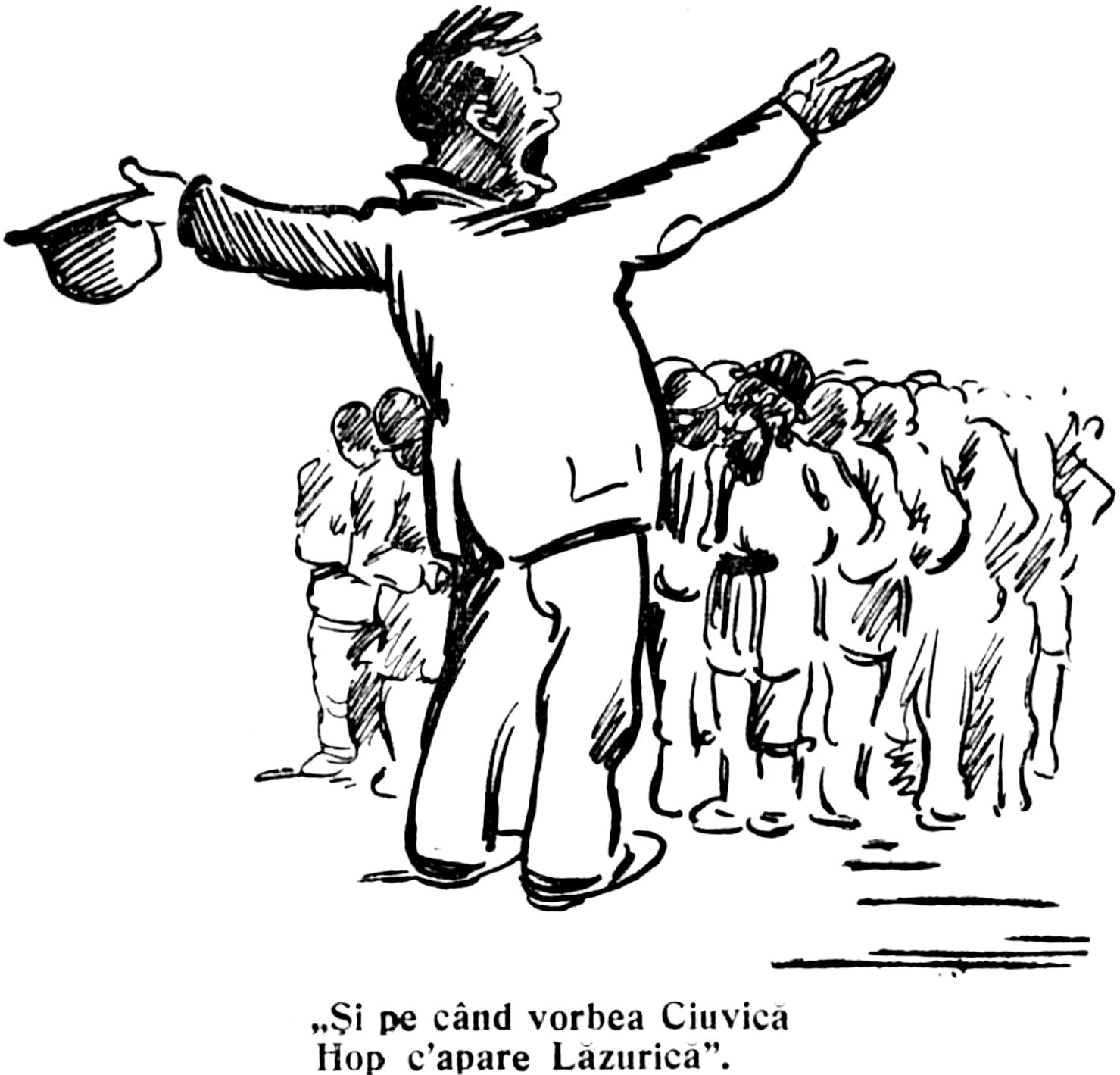
Cartoon of the September 1937 hoax, depicting Lăzurică as interrupting his own funeral ceremony

In early 1937, Lăzurică was working as a civil servant in Bucharest, until being fired by Mayor Alexandru Donescu. He was reportedly preparing to lead a Christian pilgrimage of the Romanies into the Holy Land, and hoping to be personally blessed by Timotheus, the Patriarch of Jerusalem; the delegation was also set to visit the Kingdom of Egypt. By then, the ACRR affiliation had reunited the deposed Voivode with both Șerboianu and Manolescu-Dolj; all three were accused by the UGRR of seeking to present themselves as PNC candidates in the general election of December. The ACRR recruited its members in Dolj and Ialomița; the former branch was under Lăzurică's direct supervision. A period note in the National Liberal paper Românul described him as a "short blond toothless and lisp Gypsy" who "was prancing about these last days, a swastika pinned to his chest." According to the same source, Lăzurică's electoral message was that Romanies should accept bribes "from all the parties, but only vote for Mister Goga." He also became involved in a dispute with the former PNC ideologue, Nichifor Crainic. According to the Iron Guard paper Buna Vestire, Lăzurică suggested that Crainic was a fellow Rom, and also that he had once been involved in a losing brawl at a Bucharest locale.

The UGRR press reacted against this new competitor, reviving claims that Lăzurică was a crypto-Catholic who had personally promised Pope Pius XI that he would convert Romania's Romanies. In September 1937, news agencies reported that Lăzurică had been poisoned with hemlock by "Left Wing Gipsies", for being an "ardent Nazi". This detail was not present in reports published in Nazi Germany, which instead noted: "The candidate for the throne of the Romanian Gypsies, 'Prince' Georg Lazurica, has been defeated by political opponents. [...] It is believed that the deadly poison was poured into his wine at a wedding party." Lăzurică reappeared in public to dismiss the claim, noting that it "was spread only by his political opponents." He was unable to prevent "a large number of grieving Gypsies", including "all of Bucharest's flower-girls", from attending what they believed was his scheduled funeral. Journalist Ștefan Mengoni claimed to have witnessed this procession, held at Iancul Nou Cemetery, as well as the Romanies' violent rage upon discovering that they had been duped. The issue was also covered by the humor page of Rampa, which noted that the "swarthy blond man" Lăzurică had toured Romania's newspaper offices to assure them that he was alive. The columnist also noted: "We knew Mr Lăzurică to be the king of the Roma. Here he is now, demoted to prince of the Gypsies".

Late that month, Opinia newspaper alleged that "Lăzurică, that famous chief of the Romanies", had been escorted to the 21st Police Precinct after failing to settle a bill with a saloon on Dealul Spirii. Boangiu writes that, as the conflict between the two Voivodes was turning bitter, both figures engaged in "obvious manipulation" of the truth. In the wake of the death hoax, Lăzurică and his followers announced that they would take up the offensive against "certain left-wing newspapers", since these had denied the Romanies' "assimilation into the Romanian element". To signal their visibility and commitment to "integral nationalism", they staged a rally in Iepurești, with speeches by Lăzurică, Șerboianu, Zima, Gheorghe Bașud, Ghiță Slobozeanu, and other community representatives.

By October 1937, the PNC was credited with real chances of forming the Romanian cabinet. This matter was reviewed in a satirical column by Ion Anestin, who mocked "Lăzurică the blond" as a kingmaker; Anestin also joked on Goga's usage of blue as the party color, ridiculing his Romani alliance as baniera albastră cu tuciuriu ("the blue-and-grime banner"). In his first-ever Țara Noastră editorial, Șerboianu, passing himself off as a member of the Romani community, reported that he had always fought alongside "the Roma comrade G. A. Lăzurică, who was not overcome either by intrigues, either by the lures or the cowardice of some of our brethren." Their platform, also taken up by Mirmillo, simply denied that Romanies were an ethnic minority, generally describing them as a variety of the Romanian people; they also argued that, being "too good Romanians", they would limit Romani-language content to just one page of the newspaper. As noted by Matei, Lăzurică and Șerboianu had fully reconciled and "could pass for Romani leaders" when negotiating with their PNC counterparts, Goga and A. C. Cuza; instead, the UGRR remained tied to the mainstream National Liberals.

The Jewish Party's paper, Új Kelet, reported during the December elections that Lăzurică resented the PNC for negotiating with the National Liberals behind his back, and also that, unlike Goga, he now mistrusted the Anti-Comintern Pact. According to this source, he had asked his supporters to vote for the Iron Guard (or "Everything for the County Party"), only to find his support rejected as a "joke" by Codreanu. Buna Vestire also announced that Lăzurică's offer to run in the election as a Guardsman was flatly rejected as a farce. The PNC government, appointed by Carol after a hung parliament, imposed laws for the "Romanianization" of Romania's economy, including the ouster of "racial" minorities; the Romanies, however, were entirely spared. At an ACRR rally held at Craiova on February 2, 1938, Lăzurică announced that he had joined the PNC and, again, that he supported its antisemitic doctrines. He described Romania as invaded by Jewish "lice", and praised the PNC leadership for clamping down on the "kikes' newspapers". In late 1937, the ACRR–PNC pact came under scrutiny of the National Liberal press, which noted that Romani activists on the far-right had encouraged Muslims to preserve their religion: "This is what Mr Goga's Gypsy paper publishes; and this is the national and Christian target of [his] party: it crafts Romanianism with the Gypsies and Christianity with the Mohammedans" (emphases in the original).

=== Decline and deportations ===
Soon after, the activities of all Romani groups were curtailed by the imposition of an authoritarian Constitution and of a single-party rule by the National Renaissance Front (FRN). Nevertheless, the UGRR was still tolerated, the regime having concluded that it "did not do anything which threatened the security of the state". Its entire leadership, Nicolescu included, joined the Front as early as March 1938; they then directed the effort to enlist members of various tribal groups into their respective FRN guilds, jointly with Romanian artisans. During the same month, Marta Lăzurică published in Timpul her open letter "To the Roma Women", urging them to maintain the AGȚR–ACRR structures and endorse her Gheorghe's efforts: "I make an appeal to you, my Roma sisters, to urge your husbands, your sons and your daughters to support my husband, to prove that the Roma are not a people who lack solidarity, discipline and devotion."

The authoritarian drive pushed Lăzurică away from Patriarch Cristea, who had been appointed Prime Minister after the PNC's recall. Both he and Șerboianu came to display their Catholic sympathies. In one such show of support for Catholicism, Lăzurică abandoned references to the Dormition as a Romani holiday, and proclaimed the Feast of Saints Peter and Paul as the new date of reference. With articles in Țara Noastră and Timpul, Lăzurică endorsed claims that Orthodoxy was a traditional persecutor of the Zgripți and Romani people, which it had kept as church slaves. Cristea reacted by having Lăzurică removed from the ranks of its missionaries, citing concerns that he had converted. Lăzurică informed his readers that he handed in his card myself, and that he felt "sickened" by the affair. As late as July 1940, Orthodox dignitaries still complained to the authorities about Lăzurică and the ACRR having "insulted the Church". Their reports were most likely anachronistic, as neither the group nor its leader were still active by then. In June 1938, Dreptatea newspaper informed its readers that Nazi racial policies had tuned explicit in their Romaphobia, and that Austrian Romanies were the prime targets of such persecution. Looking back on the ACRR's experiment with the "hooked-cross flag", it noted: "Perhaps now is the time for our Romanies to discover just how fatal was that action, undertaken by an immortal Lăzurică."

Sociologist Zoltan Barany wrote in 2002 that "the establishment of dictatorship effectively halted Gypsy mobilization. The fractiousness, financial mismanagement, and shortsightedness of these early Romani political institutions harmed not only themselves but also the cause of those they purportedly represented. At the same time, these were important beginnings that strengthened the Roma's confidence and encouraged their political ambitions." In mid-November 1938, the FRN mouthpiece România picked up on the news that Nicolescu was suing both Lăzurică and Șerboianu for defamation. Its reporter mocked the ongoing dispute over the title of "Romani Voivode", proposing that one of the two rivals could opt for the "more aromatic" (and homonymous in Romanian) title of "Jamaican Rum Voivode". The Front's one measure against any Romanies was taken in December 1939, when nomads were forced to submit to inspections by public health officials. However, continued efforts were made to sedentarize all tribes, and their "vagabondage" was formally banned through an act of government in February 1940. Lăzurică welcomed this step with an article in Curentul, in which he also proposed that former nomads could be remade into industrial workers. He proposed colonizing them into Bessarabia and Southern Dobruja: "It's worth trying. Nomads are fecund and vital, and suspicious of any subversive currents. They could prove to be useful elements out there in the borderlands, and skillful enough to be used by the surrounding Romanian villages."

Although it banned all Romani organizations, the National Legionary State, established by the Iron Guard that September, also remained generally tolerant of the Romanies as a group. However, the influence of Nazi theory began seeping into its official propaganda. The subsequent period saw the emergence of a strong Romaphobia in Romanian society, and the degeneration of relations between Romani activists and the Romanian far-right. Shortly after his clash with the Iron Guard, dictator Ion Antonescu singled out the Romanies as fundamentally anti-social. According to Mudure, Lăzurică's activities, and the impact they had on Romani visibility, had unwittingly contributed to this conceptualization of a "Gypsy problem". This discourse was eventually adopted by the Antonescu regime, and produced the deportation of over 20,000 Romanies into the Transnistria Governorate, east of Bessarabia. For those Romanies who were deemed as more compliant, deportation was advertised as a work of colonization, granting each family a plot of land and a ready-built house.

In the midst of deportations, some Romani corporate representation was still permitted. In April 1942, an announcement was put out by the UGRR, announcing that it was celebrating the Feast of Saint George as its patron saint day, with a ceremony at Curtea Veche Church in Bucharest. In November, the "Association of the Roma in Romania", headed by Nicolescu, made efforts to curb the Transnistrian deportations, appealing directly to King Michael. Around 1943, Romanian authorities began circulating the notion that the usage and recognition of romi was a liability, since it introduced confusion between Romanians and "Gypsies". Following Antonescu's toppling in August 1944, the UGRR was again active, with Nicolescu as its leader, and with the specific goal of assisting deportees making their way back home. Other organisms were also formed, including a Roma Union of Sibiu County, which was closely aligned with the Romanian Communist Party, and against "sellouts to imperialist capitalism." It expressed its will to avenge the deportation of 150,000 Romanies by both Romania and Germany, "side by side with our Jewish brethren in suffering."

Renamed Romani People's Union, the UGRR survived for less than five years. In 1949, the new communist regime began investigating its activities, noting that, although useful in combating "panhandling and theft by some of the Gypsies", it was politically suspect—with one board member alleged to have been active within the Iron Guard. Nicolescu had by then been compromised for associating the UGRR with National Liberal Party–Bejan. In January 1949, he was deposed and replaced with Petre Rădiță, himself a lapsed member of the Democratic Nationalist Party. The UGRR and all other community organizations were outlawed that same year, as part of a process which ended in the regime' refusal to even recognize Romanies as a distinct minority. In January 1953, the Romanian Communist Party's Petre Borilă still referred to Romanies as an existing ethnic group, while noting that it was hard to estimate their number. Lăzurică's own fate in that period is unknown: in his 1973 dictionary of pen names, literary historian Mihail Straje provides only his birth date (as 1893).
