= Burkhan =

Burkhan may refer to:

== Places ==
- Burkhan Khaldun, one of the Khentii Mountains in the Khentii Province of northeastern Mongolia
- Burkhan Bakshin Altan Sume, "The Golden Abode of the Buddha Shakyamuni" in Elista, Republic of Kalmykia, a federal subject of the Russian Federation
- Burkhan Buudai, a mountain of the Gobi-Altai Mountains and located in the Govi-Altai Province in Mongolia

== Others ==
- Burkhanism or Ak Jang, a new religious movement that flourished among the indigenous people of Russia's Gorno Altai region (okrug) between 1904 and the 1930s

== See also ==
- Burhan, an Arabic male name
