= Ion Budai-Deleanu =

Romanian writer and scholar (1760–1820)

- Born: January 6, 1760; Cigmău, Principality of Transylvania, Habsburg Empire
- Died: August 24, 1820; Lemberg, Galicia and Lodomeria, Austrian Empire
- Occupations: Poet; historian; philologist
- Era: Enlightenment
- Movement: Transylvanian School
- Writing career
- Language: Romanian
- Notable work: Țiganiada

Ion Budai-Deleanu (January 6, 1760 – August 24, 1820) was a Romanian scholar, philologist, historian, poet, and a representative of the Transylvanian School.

He was a member of the Order of the Golden and Rosy Cross, attending the society's meetings in Vienna.

== Biography ==
He was born in Csigmó (today Cigmău), a village in the town of Algyógy (today Geoagiu, Hunedoara County), located in the western part of Transylvania. Budai-Deleanu studied at Blaj gymnasium between 1772 and 1777, having Samuil Micu-Klein as a professor among others, and then at the College of Saint Barbara in Vienna between 1777 and 1779. He completed his studies with a doctorate at the University of Erlau in 1783. He settled in Lemberg (now Lviv in Ukraine) in 1797 as a royal counsellor. His main works are the first draft of Supplex Libellus Valachorum and an epic poem, entitled Țiganiada ("Gypsy Epic"), about a band of gypsies that fought alongside the army of Vlad the Impaler, the medieval ruler of Wallachia.

He was one of the first proponents of the idea of the unification of the lands that now form Romania. He proposed that the union should be achieved under the rule of the Habsburgs, through the annexation of Wallachia and Moldavia into the Grand Principality of Transylvania.

According to Budai-Deleanu, the Dacians did not have a role in the ethnogenesis of the Romanian people. He thought that the Dacians were the ancestors of the Poles.

He promoted the purification of the Romanian language from loanwords, proposing that only borrowings from Italian and French should be permitted. He also strove for the replacement of the Cyrillic script with the Latin alphabet. Budai-Deleanu was the first scholar of Transylvanian School to state that Romanian did not develop from Classical Latin directly, but from the vulgar language spoken in Dacia.

Budai-Deleanu died in Lemberg in 1820, aged 60.

Streets în Arad, Bucharest, Cluj-Napoca, Oradea, Sibiu, and Timișoara are named after him.

== Sources ==
- Boia, Lucian (1997). History and Myth in Romanian Consciousness. Central European University Press. ISBN 963-9116-97-1.
- Florescu, Radu R.; McNally, Raymond T. (1989). Dracula, Prince of Many Faces: His Life and his Times. Back Bay Books. ISBN 978-0-316-28656-5.
- Georgescu, Vlad (1991). The Romanians: A History. Ohio State University Press. ISBN 0-8142-0511-9.
