= Burhan Azeem =

American politician from Cambridge, MA

Vice Mayor of Cambridge, Massachusetts
- Incumbent
- Assumed office 2022

Burhan Azeem is an American politician and the Vice Mayor of Cambridge, Massachusetts, where he has served on the Cambridge City Council since 2022. He is a Democratic candidate running for the Massachusetts State Senate seat to represent the Second Middlesex District, covering parts of Somerville, Medford, Winchester, and Cambridge.

== Early life and education ==
Azeem was born in Pakistan and immigrated to the United States with his family at around four years of age. The family settled on Staten Island, New York after moving several times.

Azeem attended Staten Island Technical High School, winning an award at the Intel International Science and Engineering Fair. He then attended the Massachusetts Institute of Technology in Cambridge, Massachusetts, where he studied materials science and engineering, graduating in 2019. As an undergraduate he also pursued a HASS concentration in Chinese and worked in Taiwan.

After college, Azeem worked as an emergency medical technician (EMT) and later as a software engineer prior to entering politics full-time.

== Cambridge City Council ==
Azeem first ran for Cambridge City Council in 2019 at age 22 and lost. He ran again in 2021 and was elected, taking office in 2022 as the youngest city councilor in Cambridge history at the time. He was reelected in 2023 and 2025, where he now serves as Vice Mayor.

During his tenure, Azeem has focused primarily on housing affordability, along with street safety and transit issues. His first major legislative initiative as a councilor was a proposal to eliminate mandatory parking minimums for new development, which passed and made Cambridge the first municipality in Massachusetts to remove parking requirements citywide. He also helped expand zoning to allow 100% affordable housing developments to be built taller along major corridors and squares, and was a leading advocate for the 2024 citywide multifamily zoning ordinance, which eliminated single-family-only zoning across most of Cambridge's residential land. He also chaired the council's Fare-Free Working Group, which pushed for the elimination of fares on an MBTA bus route as part of a pilot program.

In his first council campaign in 2021, Azeem ran in part on a platform of delivering universal pre-kindergarten in Cambridge. The city's free preschool program, the Cambridge Preschool Program, launched in 2024 during Azeem's second term, guaranteeing access for all four-year-olds and some three-year-olds, capping a three-decade local effort to establish universal pre-K. In his second term, Azeem expanded the program to cover all three-year-olds in Cambridge. He has also supported greater transparency in municipal government.

In the 2025 Cambridge municipal election, U.S. Representative Ayanna Pressley endorsed a slate of Cambridge City Council candidates that included Azeem.

Azeem began a term as Vice Mayor of Cambridge in 2026, having previously served on the council's committees addressing housing, transportation, and government operations. Azeem has cultivated a reputation as an effective legislator and coalition-builder. In a 2023 interview, he said he had not lost a single vote during his second term on the council. The Boston Globe attributed his ability to advance the 2024 zoning overhaul in part to his political skills and practice of tailoring his pitch to different constituencies. Jesse Kanson-Benanav, executive director of Abundant Housing Massachusetts, said in 2026 that seeing Azeem's record of pushing through long-stalled housing measures was 'really notable.'

== Public communication ==
Azeem maintains active accounts on X (Twitter), TikTok, and Bluesky, where he discusses local and state policy issues such as zoning, transit, and municipal finance for a general audience. Since August 2025, he has also co-hosted "Everybody Gets Pie", a podcast on the abundance movement, alongside Justine Underhill and Armand Domalewski, featuring conversations with lawmakers and commentators on housing, energy, transit, and related policy.

== Housing advocacy work ==
Azeem founded Abundant Housing Massachusetts, a statewide nonprofit organization that advocates for increased housing production and zoning reform, and has served on its board along with other housing advocates. He also serves on the board of the Welcoming Neighbors Network. Azeem has described his political philosophy as combining progressive economic goals with an "abundance"-oriented approach to policy that emphasizes increasing the supply of housing and infrastructure. In August 2025, he co-authored an essay in The Nation arguing that the abundance agenda and progressive economic populism are complementary goals, citing his own record on Cambridge zoning reform as an example.

== 2026 Massachusetts State Senate campaign ==
In early 2026, Azeem announced his candidacy for the Second Middlesex District seat in the Massachusetts State Senate. Azeem is running as a Democrat in a contested primary scheduled for September 1, 2026. His campaign has emphasized housing production, MBTA service and funding, and government transparency, taking a systems-level approach to solving problems.

== Personal life ==
Azeem is Muslim and speaks English, Urdu, and Chinese. He and his wife had a public wedding in May 2026.
