= Olga Pankova =

- Ольга Панкова
- Born: 1911; Russian Empire (present-day Russia)
- Died: 1991
- Citizenship: Soviet Union
- Occupation(s): poet, translator

Olga Pankova (Russian: Ольга Ивановна Панкова; 1911–1991) — Soviet Romani poet.

== Biography ==
Was born in 1911 in Saint Petersburg. In 10 years age became an orphan. Her uncle Romani poet Nikolai Pankov was her only support.

She worked in several Romani newspapers starting her author and translator career.

Her first book Амарэ Дывэса (The our days) was published in 1933.

Olga Pankova devoted her activity to Romani culture and liquidation of illiteracy among Romani people in Russia.

Died in 1991.

== Sources and external links ==
- Костры. Сборник стихов цыганских поэтов. Составил Николай Саткевич. — М.: Советская Россия, 1974. — 117 с. — С. 36—37
- Famous Romes of the world (in Russian)
