= Karagöz, Bismil =

Village in Diyarbakır Province, Turkey

Karagöz
- Neighbourhood
- Location in Turkey
- Coordinates: 37.946°N 40.601°E
- Country: Turkey
- Province: Diyarbakır
- District: Bismil
- Population (2022): 404
- Time zone: UTC+3 (TRT)

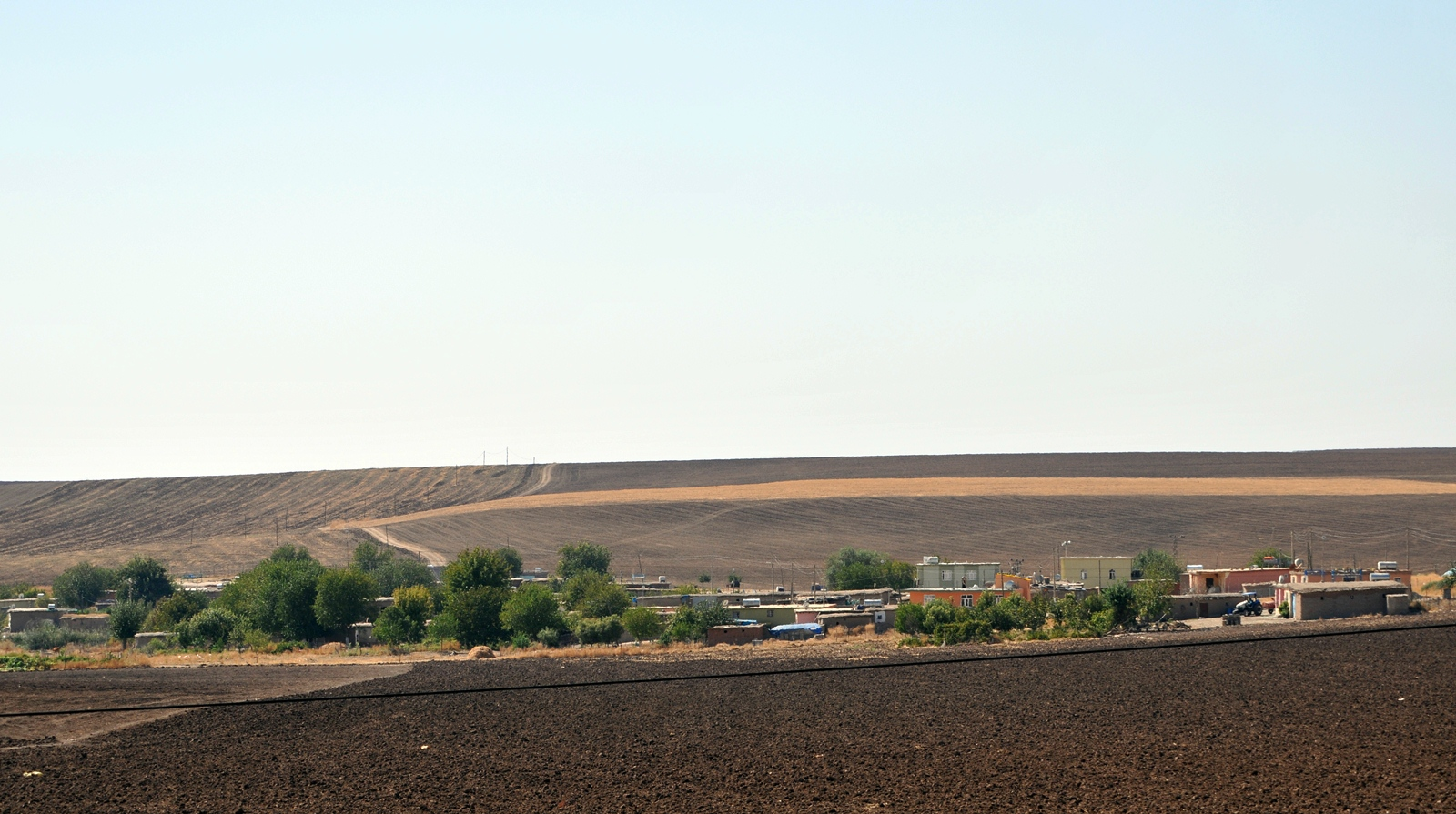
Karagöz, Bismil in 2010

Karagöz (Kurdish: Qerengozê) is a neighbourhood in the municipality and district of Bismil, Diyarbakır Province in Turkey. The village is populated by Kurds and had a population of 404 in 2022.

It was burned by authorities in 1995, during the Kurdish–Turkish conflict.
