= Mohan Niranjit Burhan =

Sri Lankan judge

- Occupation: Judge of the Supreme Court of Seychelles

Mohan Burhan is a judge of the Supreme Court of Seychelles.

== Early life and education ==
He was born in Sri Lanka in 1957. Burhan was educated at S. Thomas' College, Mt Lavinia Sri Lanka and graduated from the Sri Lanka Law College. He was awarded a master's degree in law from the University of Wales in the United Kingdom.

== Career ==
Burhan served in the Seychelles as magistrate and judge between 1996 and 2000. Burhan was appointed as an expatriate Judge of the Supreme Court of Seychelles in 2008. Burhan previously served as an attorney in various districts of Sri Lanka as well as magistrate, district judge and High Court judge in Sri Lanka. He applied successfully for citizenship of Seychelles and was appointed to the Supreme Court as a Puisne Judge.
