= Burhan Ahmed Farooqi =

Pakistani philosopher and Islamic theologian

- Born: 12 November 1906; Amroha, British India
- Died: 14 July 1995 (aged 88); Lahore, Pakistan
- Education: Aligarh Muslim University
- Occupations: Philosopher; theologian

Burhan Ahmed Farooqi (1906 - 1995) was a Pakistani philosopher and Islamic theologian. He was a close companion of Muhammad Iqbal and on Iqbal's instruction, he wrote his Ph.D thesis "The Mujaddid's Conception of Tawhid".

== Biography ==
Farooqi was born on 12 November 1906 in Amroha, British India.

He received his primary education from Multan and then completed his PhD from Aligarh Muslim University where he studied philosophy and Metaphysics under the supervision of Dr. Syed Zafarul Hasan. Later, he came into close relations with the poet-philosopher Muhammad Iqbal. At the request of Dr. Muhammad Iqbal, he wrote his PhD thesis on the theory of Tawheed of Mujaddid al-Af Sani, which was later published in a book form in 1940 under the title "Hazrat Mujaddid Al Thani ka Nazariyah i Tawheed". He had been teaching in the Aligarh Muslim University for a long time. After the establishment of Pakistan, he came to Pakistan and continued to teach in various educational institutions. He taught in institutions like Government Zamindar College, Gujrat, Islamia College Jalandhar, MAO College Lahore, Islamia College Lahore, and the University of the Punjab. Some of his famous students include Dr. Khizar Yaseen, Dr Tariq Mahmood Awan, Abdul Aziz Khalid, Dr. Bashir Ahmed Siddiqui, and Tahirul Qadri.

Farooqi died on 14 July 1995 in Lahore. He was 89.

== Scholarly works ==
- The Mujaddid's Conception of Tawhid
- Minhaj-ul-Quran
- Islam and living problems of Muslims
- Allama Iqbal and the political ideal of Muslims
- Qur'anic philosophy of history
- Ideology of Pakistan
- Bakiyat Khwaja Bakiballah
- The view of Hazrat Mujaddid al-Thani on Tawheed
- The political ideals of Muslims
