= Țiganiada =

- Author: Ion Budai-Deleanu
- Original title: Țiganiada
- Language: Romanian
- Genre: Epic poem Narrative poetry Satire
- Publisher: Biblioteca Academiei
- Publication date: 1925
- Publication place: Romania
- Pages: 240

Țiganiada is a Romanian epic poem written by poet and scholar Ion Budai-Deleanu, the first epic poem written in the Romanian language. The poem features a fictionalized version of Vlad the Impaler's reign.

The heroicomical poem treats an allegorical subject with satirical, antifeudal and anticlerical tendencies, being a complex and unexpectedly modern literary work that contains a significant amount of Enlightenment ideas. Budai-Deleanu used Romanian words of Slavic origin to make it sound more ancient. It includes twelve songs in 1381 stanzas.

== History and structure ==
The first version of Țiganiada was written in 1800, and the second in 1812. At least three editions were published, although they contained errors and were truncated. The poem was duly published in 1925. Țiganiada was written in the spirit of the Enlightenment, Deleanu borrowing a series of ideas which he adapted to Transylvania's historical context, the region finding itself under Hungarian rule, the work potentially being banned under those circumstances.

The poem contains twelve songs in 1381 stanzas and a prologue which includes an epistle addressed to Mitru Perea (Petru Maior), a fellow Transylvanian School member and writer. The work is signed under Deleanu's pen name, Leonachi Dianeu, an anagram of his name.

== Themes and interpretation ==
Țiganiada mainly treats a nationalistic and emancipatory subject, being concerned with the fight for liberty and national identity, illustrating the opposition to feudalism, aristocracy, and the clergy. The poem satirizes authoritarian tendencies such as the perpetuation of despotism and social injustice. The fictionalized image of Vlad the Impaler suggests enlightened absolutism, being presented as a rational leader who loves his country and people, while Romândor represents the Romanian peoples efforts in fighting for social and national liberty.

== Plot summary ==
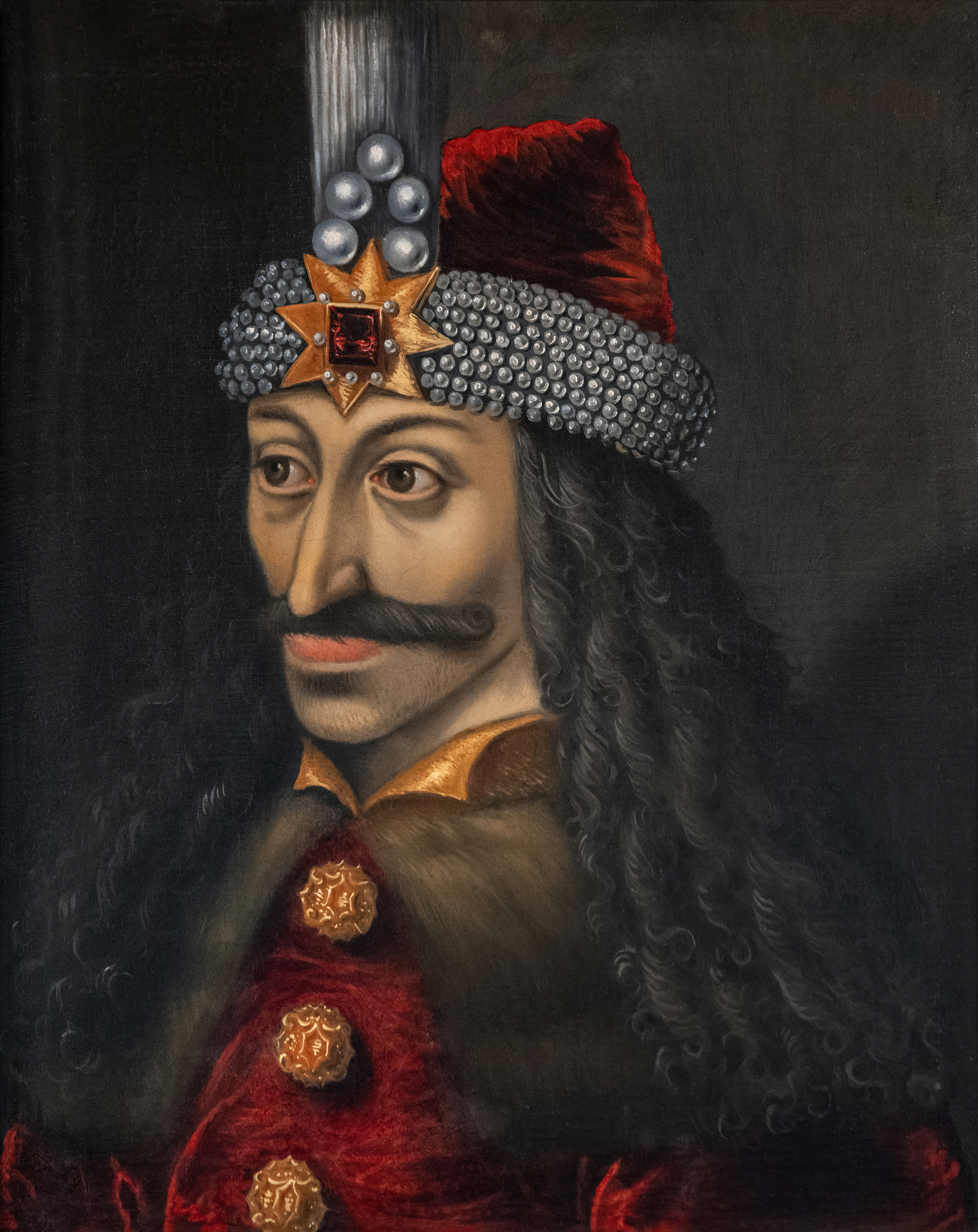
Vlad's portrait at Schloss Ambras, Innsbruck

Vlad the Impaler, the voivode of Wallachia, plans a resistance movement against the Ottoman Empire, bringing his troops to battle, while also recruiting the Romani. One of the measures which the voivode adopts is preventing betrayal, knowing that the Ottomans may seek to use the Romani as spies. The voivode brings the Romani to a camp where they can train to fight against the Ottomans. The Romani parade in front of Vlad, each having a different flag.

The Romani swear fealty to Vlad, who offers them provisions and weapons. One of the Romani leaders is sent to the voivode, demanding Vlad to send a body of troops with the objective of protecting the Romani. In order to test the Romanis loyalty, Vlad and the officers disguise themselves as ottoman soldiers and attack the Romani encampment. When the Romani are attacked, they surrender and are ready to betray the Romanians, begging for mercy, claiming that they are not guilty of anything. When the Romani realize that the Ottomans are in fact disguised Romanians, they again beg for mercy and promise that they will fight alongside them against the Ottomans.

When the real Ottomans attack, the Romani, led by Parpangel, fight valiantly and manage to frighten the Ottoman army. In another narrative layer, Satan kidnaps Romica, Parpangel's fiancée, who leaves in search of her. He eventually finds her in an enchanted forest, locked away in a palace.

The poem continues with a focus on three Romani leaders: Parpangel, Tandaler, and Corcodel. The Romani decide to fight against the Ottomans, but because they are frightened, Tandaler advises them to fight with their eyes closed so they won't be scared at the sight of the enemy. The Romani meet a herd of bullocks, which they attack until it runs away. Parpangel marries Romica and tells the wedding guests about the journey he made through Heaven and Hell.

The Romani hear that Vlad might have been defeated by the Ottomans and that Wallachia may have been left without a ruler. They decide to create a country of their own, discussing various forms of government, oscillating between a republic and a monarchy. Although Vlad is triumphant, he is overthrown by treacherous boyars and is forced to take exile. Furthermore, the Romanian Army is coagulated under a symbolic hero named Romândor and decide to continue the fight against the Ottomans. However, the boyars oppose this, fearing Ottoman vengeance.

== Reception ==
Literary critic and writer George Călinescu remarked Deleanu's verbal genius and the particular names chosen for the characters (Aordel, Corcodel, Găvan, Ciormoi, Parpangel).

Țiganiada is the most relevant written text for the Romanian literary language at the end of the 18th century. Nicolae Manolescu considers it “our last Baroque work in the true sense of the word”.
