= Dimiter Golemanov =

Bulgarian Romani poet and teacher (1938-1994)

Dimiter (also spelled Dimitar) Golemanov (1938–1994) was a Bulgarian Romani poet and teacher. His father was involved in trade unionism and anti-fascist politics since the 1930s. Golemanov became known in Romani studies through a version of the Balkan tale, "Song of the Bridge," published by the Soviet ethnographer Lev Cherenkov in the Journal of the Gypsy Lore Society.

Golemanov studied Russian at Sofia University, writing poetry and songs in Russian, Bulgarian, and Romani. He attended the second World Romani Congress in Geneva. He died from a heart attack in 1994.
