= Burhan Karagöz =

Turkish businessperson (1929–2019)

Burhan Karagöz (22 December 1929 – 25 May 2019) was a Turkish businessman. He was chair of Anadolu Sigorta A.S., biggest insurance company in Turkey. He worked 48 years at Isbank, largest private bank in Turkey; of which last 20 years were at top level as CEO, board member, and chairman, thus became one of the influential figures in Turkish economy in the last quarter of the 20th century.

== Career ==
Karagöz started his professional career in 1953 at İşbank's Board of Inspectors. After serving as the Manager of the Deposits Department, as the Chairman of İşbank's Board of Inspectors and lastly as the Manager of the Loans Department of İşbank; he was appointed as Deputy Chief Executive in 1972. He was appointed as the chief executive officer of İşbank in 1982. After his voluntary retirement in 1988; Burhan Karagöz was appointed to İşbank's Board as Member at the same time and then as the chairman in 1996. He completed this duty at İşbank in 2002. In addition to his post at İşbank; Burhan Karagöz was board member of Anadolubank, was the Chairman of Aslan Çimento (Aslan Cement), Türkiye Sınai Kalkınma Bankası (TSKB), Dışbank, and also Turkish Eximbank. Burhan Karagöz was chosen as the Chairman of Anadolu Insurance Company on 18 October 1993. He was also the Chairman of Anadolu Insurance Corporate Governance Committee. Burhan Karagöz was also a member of Turkish Industrialists' and Businessmen's Association (TUSIAD).

== Personal life and death ==
Born on 22 December 1929 in Istanbul, Turkey, Burhan Karagöz was married to Aysen Karagoz and had four children and eight grandchildren. He graduated from İstanbul Higher Education School of Economics and Commerce in 1951. Burhan Karagöz died on 25 May 2019, at the age of 89.
