= Rahim Burhan =

Macedonian theatre director

- Born: 24 November 1949 (age 76); Skopje, PR Macedonia, FPR Yugoslavia
- Other name: Macedonian: Рахим Бурхан
- Occupation: Theatre director

Rahim Burhan (Macedonian: Рахим Бурхан; born 24 November 1949) is a Macedonian theatre director.

Burhan became known as the founder and artistic director of the Roma-theatre "Pralipe" (engl. 'brotherhood') from Skopje. He grew up in Skopje and studied at the Yugoslavian School of Film. In his theatre productions, he worked on political themes, such as the treatment of minorities in states and violence towards ethnic groups or asylum seekers.

In Germany, the theatre 'Pralipe' became known particularly by means of its cooperation with the Theater an der Ruhr from Muelheim. The cooperation began with 'Ratvale Bijava' (Blood Marriage) by Federico García Lorca and 'Marat/Sade' by Peter Weiss, both of which were first staged at the theatre in Muelheim in 1991. It toured through a number of cities in Germany, the Netherlands, and Switzerland. With the slogan 'The Gypsies are back again', the Theatre an der Ruhr and Pralipe engaged in the growing discrimination against foreigners in Germany. 'Ratvale Bijava' was staged in Romany in about 15 cities, amongst them Halle, Hoyerswerda, Luebeck, Magdeburg, Munich and Rostock. After the performances, the actors sought to initiate conversations with the audience.

In 1998, Pralipe was invited to the International Theatre Festival MESS in Sarajevo with their staging of 'Yerma'. Celebrating ten years of cooperation, the festival '10 Years Roma Theatre Pralipe' was organised in 2001. Amongst other performances, the exhibition 'Colours of Roma-Children' was also shown and discussions were held.
